= Naganishia vishniacii =

Scientific classification
- Kingdom: Fungi
- Division: Basidiomycota
- Class: Tremellomycetes
- Order: Filobasidiales
- Family: Filobasidiaceae
- Genus: Naganishia
- Species: N. vishniacii

Binomial name
- Naganishia vishniacii (Vishniac & Hempfling) X.Z. Liu, F.Y. Bai, M. Groenew. & Boekhout (2015)

Synonyms
- Cryptococcus vishniacii

Species of fungus

Naganishia vishniacii is an extremophile fungus originally isolated as a yeast from soil samples in the dry valleys of Antarctica. The species grows at 4 degrees Celsius and below but not at 26 degrees Celsius and above. Visually it is characterized as a cream mass in culture. It is nonfermentative and assimilates glucose, maltose, melezitose, trehalose, and xylose. Molecular research, based on cladistic analysis of DNA sequences, shows that the species does not belong in the Cryptococcaceae.

A yeast was described as Cryptococcus socialis in a 1985 paper by Helen S. Vishniac, together with C. consortionalis. A 2012 study mentions that both species were folded into C. vishniacii, together with C. lupi.
