= Naganishia albidosimilis =

Scientific classification
- Kingdom: Fungi
- Division: Basidiomycota
- Class: Tremellomycetes
- Order: Filobasidiales
- Family: Filobasidiaceae
- Genus: Naganishia
- Species: N. albidosimilis

Binomial name
- Naganishia albidosimilis (Vishniac & Kurtzman) X.Z. Liu, F.Y. Bai, M. Groenew. & Boekhout (2015)

Synonyms
- Cryptococcus albidosimilis

Species of fungus

Naganishia albidosimilis (synonym Cryptococcus albidosimilis) is a species of fungus in the family Filobasidiaceae. It is currently only known from its yeast state, isolated from soil in Antarctica.

When plated on agar Naganishia albidosimilis produces colonies that are shining white. The colonies appear to be mucosoid when plated on agar. When grown in liquid media, the yeast fails to grow well unless the media is constantly agitated. This species is considered mesophilic, with optimal growth temperature at 25 °C. The yeast cells are ovoid and produce a capsule. Naganishia albidosimilis reproduces through budding and it does not appear as though this species reproduces through any sexual means. When mature, the cell size is approximately 4.9μm to 6.6μm. Naganishia albidosimilis can use L-arabinose, cellobiose, citrate at pH 6.0, ethanol, D-glucitol, gluconate at pH 5.8, glucuronate at pH 5.5, myo-inositol, lactose, maltose, mannitol, melezitose, α-methylglucoside, L-rhamnose, salicin, soluble starch, succinate at pH 5.5, sucrose and xylose as sole carbon sources. Naganishia albidosimilis can also use L-lysine, nitrate and cadaverine as sole nitrogen sources. This species cannot ferment. Naganishia albidosimilis is DBB positive, and produces amylose.
