= Naganishia adeliensis =

Scientific classification
- Kingdom: Fungi
- Division: Basidiomycota
- Class: Tremellomycetes
- Order: Filobasidiales
- Family: Filobasidiaceae
- Genus: Naganishia
- Species: N. adeliensis

Binomial name
- Naganishia adeliensis (Scorzetti, I. Petrescu, Yarrow & Fell) X.Z. Liu, F.Y. Bai, M. Groenew. & Boekhout (2015)

Synonyms
- Cryptococcus adeliensis

Species of fungus

Naganishia adeliensis (synonym Cryptococcus adeliensis) is a species of fungus in the family Filobasidiaceae. It is currently only known from its yeast state, isolated from decaying algae in Antarctica.

When plated on agar Naganishia adeliensis produces colonies that are cream, with a smooth, glossy appearance. The colonies frequently appear to have a soft texture. The optimal growth range for this species is at 25 degrees Celsius. Naganishia adeliensis is incapable of fermentation, as is typical of Naganishia species. This species is able to use sucrose, maltose, cellbiose, trehalose, raffinose, citrate, inositol ethanol, soluble starch, melezitose, xylitol, saccharate, salicin as well as many other compounds as sole carbon sources. Naganishia adeliensis is able to use nitrate, nitrite and cadaverine (a protein created when animals decay and which produces the putrid smell associated with this decay) as sources of nitrogen. This species forms starch as it grows. Naganishia adeliensis also grows on 0.01% cycloheximide.
