= Solicoccozyma aeria =

Scientific classification
- Kingdom: Fungi
- Division: Basidiomycota
- Class: Tremellomycetes
- Order: Filobasidiales
- Family: Piskurozymaceae
- Genus: Solicoccozyma
- Species: S. aeria

Binomial name
- Solicoccozyma aeria (Saito) A.M. Yurkov

Synonyms
- Torula aeria Cryptococcus aerius

Species of fungus

Solicoccozyma aeria is a species of fungus in the family Piskurozymaceae. It has only been found in its yeast state, though a filamentous state producing basidia may be formed in culture.

== Distribution ==
The species is an obligate aerobe, that has been isolated from soil samples and samples of sand.

== Biochemistry ==
The species has a growth temperature range between 20 °C and 35 °C. It secretes amylase at the end of its exponential phase, and it is believed to produce the most amylase at 30 °C between pH 4.5 and pH 6. It is believed that the amylases produced by S. aeria are able to digest raw starch; this has been studied extensively, because breaking down raw starch has become increasingly important in the production of materials such as liquid fuel and chemicals. This species' ability to break down starch is greatly improved when it is co-cultured with Saccharomyces cerevisiae.

Solicoccozyma aeria is able to use glucose, galactose, maltose and starch as sole carbon sources, and it is able to use nitrate and nitrite as sole nitrogen sources.
