= Zyzygomyces physciacearum =

- Galls of Zyzygomyces physciacearum

Scientific classification
- Kingdom: Fungi
- Division: Basidiomycota
- Class: Tremellomycetes
- Order: Filobasidiales
- Family: Filobasidiaceae
- Genus: Zyzygomyces
- Species: Z. physciacearum

Binomial name
- Zyzygomyces physciacearum Diederich, Millanes, Wedin & Lawrey (2022)

Synonyms
- Syzygospora physciacearum Diederich (1996) Basionym; Heterocephalacria physciacearum (Diedrich) Millanes & Wedin (2016) homotypic synonym

Species of fungus

Zyzygomyces physciacearum is a species of lichenicolous fungus (lichen dwelling) in the family Filobasidiaceae. It is a parasite characterized by its waxy, often gelatinous galls that are often pale brown in color but can be darker in central areas, though they are frequently unpigmented. It was described by Paul Diederich, Ana M. Millanes, Mats Wedin & James D. Lawrey in 2022. It has mostly been found in Europe, with some findings in North America, Australia, and Papua New Guinea. It primarily parasitizes the fungus of the Physcia genus.
