= Naganishia bhutanensis =

Scientific classification
- Kingdom: Fungi
- Division: Basidiomycota
- Class: Tremellomycetes
- Order: Filobasidiales
- Family: Filobasidiaceae
- Genus: Naganishia
- Species: N. bhutanensis

Binomial name
- Naganishia bhutanensis (Goto & Sugiy.) X.Z. Liu, F.Y. Bai, M. Groenew. & Boekhout (2015)

Synonyms
- Cryptococcus bhutanensis

Species of fungus

Naganishia bhutanensis is a species of fungus in the family Filobasidiaceae. It was isolated in its yeast state from soil in Bhutan. The cell is encapsulated with an extended ovoid shape. When the cell buds, it creates birth scars, and the neck of the new yeast fits inside of the bud scar neck. The new cell typically only buds from the birth scar present from where it budded off the parent cell. In over half of the dividing cells in N. bhutanensis cultures the cell walls were holoblastic, meaning that the new cell wall was continuous with the old cell wall on the parent cell; the remaining portion of dividing cells in N. bhutanensis cultures divide enteroblastically, meaning that only the inner layer of the new cell wall is continuous with the inner layer of the parental cell wall. After the cells bud off they produce a collar on the parent cell. One thing of note with N. bhutanensis is that mitosis is not intranuclear. This species does not produce urease.
