= Naganishia antarctica =

Scientific classification
- Kingdom: Fungi
- Division: Basidiomycota
- Class: Tremellomycetes
- Order: Filobasidiales
- Family: Filobasidiaceae
- Genus: Naganishia
- Species: N. antarctica

Binomial name
- Naganishia antarctica (Vishniac & Kurtzman) X.Z. Liu, F.Y. Bai, M. Groenew. & Boekhout (2015)

Synonyms
- Cryptococcus antarcticus

Species of fungus

Naganishia antarctica is a yeast species that has been isolated from soil in Antarctica.

This species grows best between 4 °C (39 °F) and 20 °C (68 °F), and some strains have been observed to grow above 25 °C (77 °F). This temperature range is one of the only things that can distinguish it from N. albida on the DNA level, however, it can be phenotypically differentiated through its ability to utilize different minerals and its overall appearance. When plated the colonies have a slightly mucosoid appearance, with a white to cream coloration. Naganishia antarctica is able to assimilate nitrogen and glucoronate, and some strains can turn a dirty yellow when doing so. When being cultured in liquid media, constant agitation is required. On a microscopic level this yeast is ovoid. Naganishia antarctica has not been seen to sexually reproduce, but when it reproduces asexually it does so through budding. Mature cells that have not recently budded typically are 4.0 μm by 7.5 μm, and they do not appear to produce pseudomycelium. Naganishia antarctica is not able to ferment, but all of its strains use cellobiose, 2-ketogluconate in hemicalcium salt, gluconate at pH 5.8, glucuronate at pH 5.5, maltose, mannitol, melezitose, soluble starch and succinate at pH 5.5 as sole carbon sources. Only certain strains of N. anarctica can use citrate at pH 6.0, D-glucitol, L-arabinose, raffinose and xylose as sole carbon sources. This species does not require vitamins for optimal growth. Naganishia antarctica is able to produce amylose. This species is also able to assimilate L-lysine, nitrate and cadaverine as nitrogen sources.
