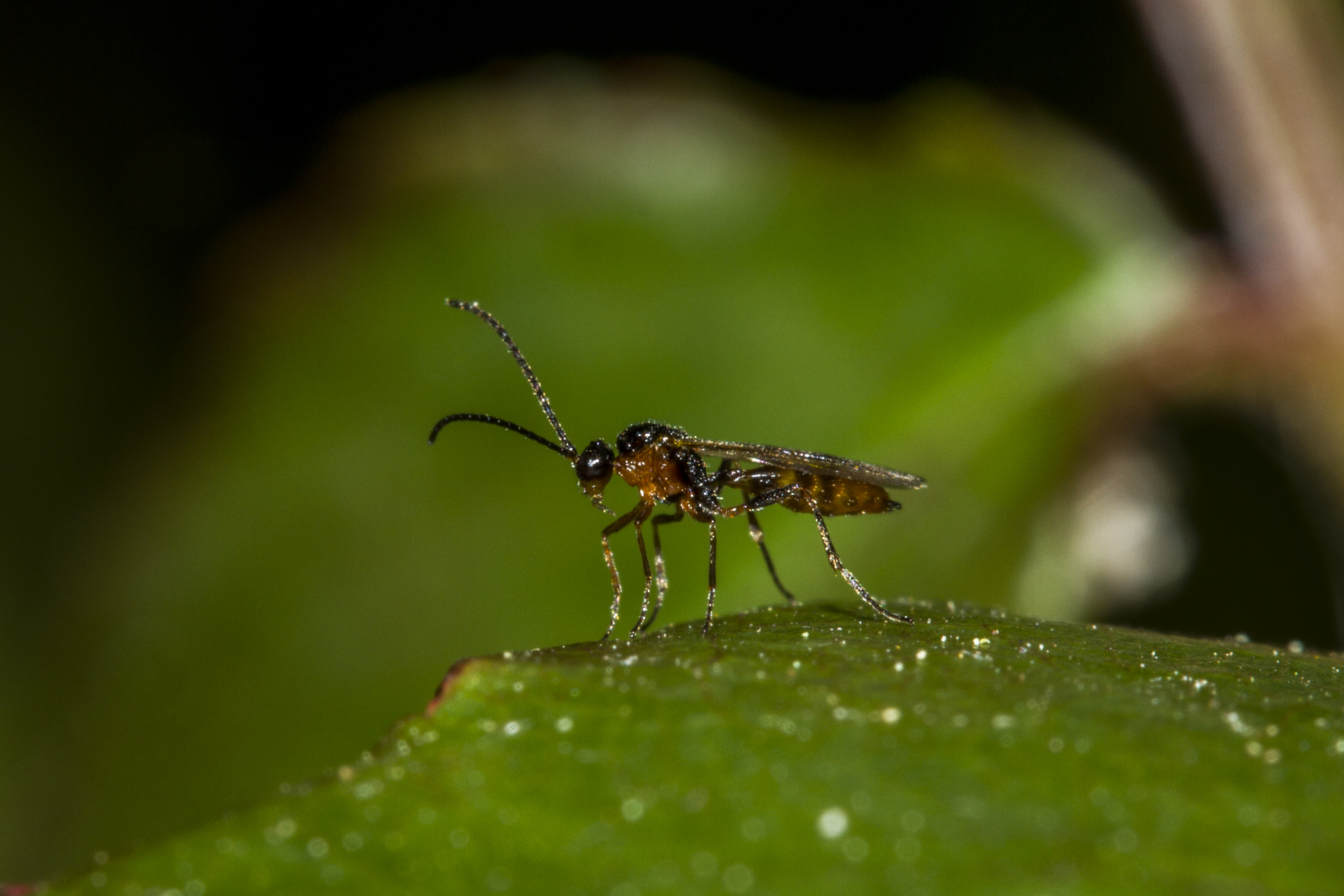
- Aphidius ervi adult

Scientific classification
- Kingdom: Animalia
- Phylum: Arthropoda
- Class: Insecta
- Order: Hymenoptera
- Family: Braconidae
- Genus: Aphidius
- Species: A. ervi

Binomial name
- Aphidius ervi Haliday, 1834

Synonyms
- Aphidius fumipennis Győrfi, 1958; Bracon infirmus Nees von Esenbeck, 1811; Aphidius medicaginis Marshall, 1898; Aphidius mirotarsi Starý, 1963; Aphidius ulmi Marshall, 1896; Aphidius ervi nigrescens Mackauer, 1962

= Aphidius ervi =

Species of wasp

Aphidius ervi is a species of parasitoid wasp in the subfamily Aphidiinae of the family Braconidae. It can be found globally.

A. ervi is used as a biological control for aphids in order to prevent aphid damage to crops. It parasitizes several Macrosiphinae aphid species, including the pea aphid (Acyrthosiphon pisum), but it prefers the potato aphid (Macrosiphum euphorbiae) and foxglove aphid (Aulacorthum solani) as its hosts.
