= Solicoccozyma terrea =

Scientific classification
- Kingdom: Fungi
- Division: Basidiomycota
- Class: Tremellomycetes
- Order: Filobasidiales
- Family: Piskurozymaceae
- Genus: Solicoccozyma
- Species: S. terrea

Binomial name
- Solicoccozyma terrea (Di Menna) A.M. Yurkov (2015)

Synonyms
- Cryptococcus terreus Di Menna (1954)

Species of fungus

Solicoccozyma terrea (synonym Cryptococcus terreus) is a species of fungus in the family Piskurozymaceae. It is only known from its yeast state. In this state, it can use glucose, lactose, galactose and potassium nitrate. The cells are oval with mucous capsules. Cultures of the yeast are cream at first, becoming tan with a “tough” surface skin. No mycelium is present.
