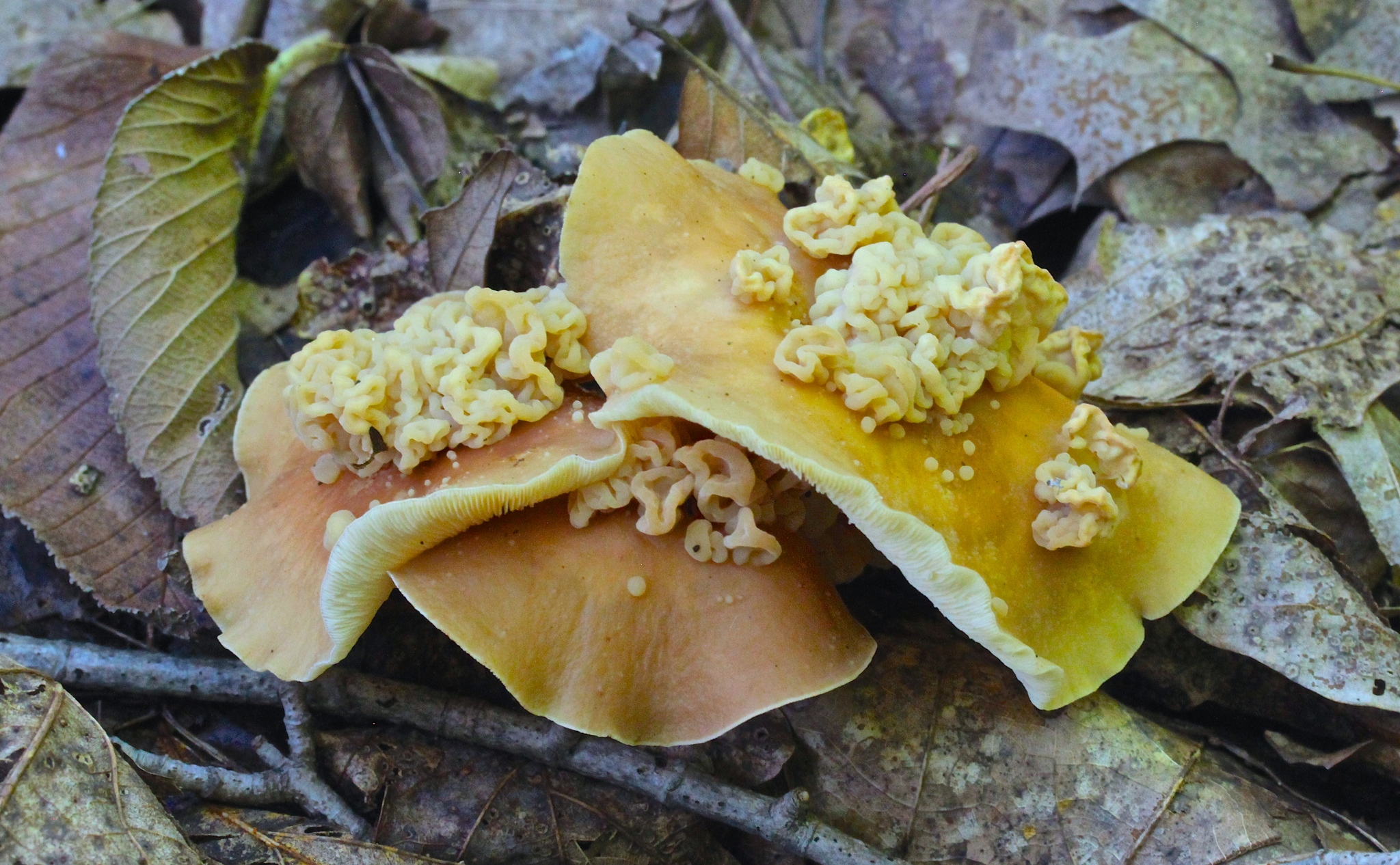
- Syzygospora mycetophila growing on Collybia mushrooms

Scientific classification
- Kingdom: Fungi
- Division: Basidiomycota
- Class: Tremellomycetes
- Order: Filobasidiales
- Family: Filobasidiaceae
- Genus: Syzygospora; G.W.Martin (1937)

Type species
- Syzygospora alba G.W.Martin (1937)

Species
- See text

Synonyms
- Carcinomyces Oberw. & Bandoni (1982); Christiansenia Hauerslev (1969)

= Syzygospora =

Genus of fungi

Syzygospora is a genus of fungi in the family Filobasidiaceae. Circumscribed by the American mycologist George Willard Martin in 1937, the genus is characterized by its gelatinous fruiting bodies that often form galls on host organisms. Syzygospora species possess distinctive features such as thin-walled hyphae with clamp connections, haustorial branches, and a hymenium containing probasidia that develop into elongated, club-shaped basidia. The genus has undergone taxonomic revisions, including the synonymization of Christiansenia and the transfer of some lichenicolous (lichen-dwelling) species to the newly established genus Zyzygomyces. As of 2024, the genus comprises 13 accepted species.

== Taxonomy ==
The genus was circumscribed in 1937 by the American mycologist George Willard Martin, with Syzygospora alba assigned as the type species. He collected the type specimen of this species in the valley of the upper Chiriquí Viejo River, in Panama. The genus name Syzygospora is derived from a combination of the Greek words σύζυγος ('yoked together') and σπορά ('spore'). The family Syzygosporaceae was proposed by Walter Jülichen in 1982 to contain the genus, but this has since been folded into synonymy with Filobasidiaceae.

Initial molecular phylogenetics studies published in 2011 showed that Syzygospora is nested within the Filobasidiales. This work also showed that Christiansenia is synonymous with Syzygospora. Initially, two lichenicolous species were placed in the genus Syzygospora. Later, molecular evidence suggested that these species did not belong in Syzygospora and showed some similarities with the type species of Heterocephalacria, H. solida, and so they were reclassified into that genus. This reclassification, however, was premature. The two lichenicolous species have a unique basidium type that is whole rather than having cross-like septa at the apex, distinguishing them from Heterocephalacria. Additionally, no molecular data for Heterocephalacria in the strict sense was available at the time of reclassification.

Subsequent genetic sequencing of Heterocephalacria solida specimens revealed that it belongs to the order Tremellales. This finding confirmed that the two lichenicolous species did not fit within the genus Heterocephalacria. As a result, a new genus, Zyzygomyces, was established to accommodate the lichenicolous species.

== Description ==
The fungal genus Syzygospora is characterized by its gelatinous fruiting bodies, which often cause the formation of galls (abnormal growths) on their host organisms. The internal structure of these fruiting bodies includes thin-walled hyphae, which are thread-like filaments, often featuring clamp connections that assist in cellular division. They also possess haustorial branches, specialized structures used to draw nutrients from the host, giving them a tremelloid (jelly-like) appearance.

The hymenium, the spore-producing surface, contains many early-stage spore-forming cells known as probasidia. These initial cells are ellipsoid in shape and often have basal clamps. The hymenium lacks hyphidia (sterile filaments) and cystidia (large sterile cells).

As the basidia mature, they become elongated and club-shaped (clavate) or somewhat cylindrical. They may lack internal divisions (aseptate) or have incomplete septa. Each mature basidium has 2–6 short, needle-like structures called epibasidia, which are often shiny or refractive at the tips.

The basidiospores, or reproductive spores, can be released in two ways: either by being forcefully ejected and attached at an angle, or by being passively released and attached symmetrically. These spores are typically ellipsoid (oval) or limoniform (lemon-shaped), with a reflective attachment point.

Syzygospora also produces various types of asexual spores. In two species, zygoconidia are formed, while several other species produce blastoconidia. Some species that live on lichens produce conidia that are either linked together in chains (catenate) or crescent-shaped (lunate). Additionally, one lichen-dwelling species is known to produce asteroconidia, a type of star-shaped spore.

== Species ==
As of July 2024, Species Fungorum (in the Catalogue of Life) accepts 13 species of Syzygospora:

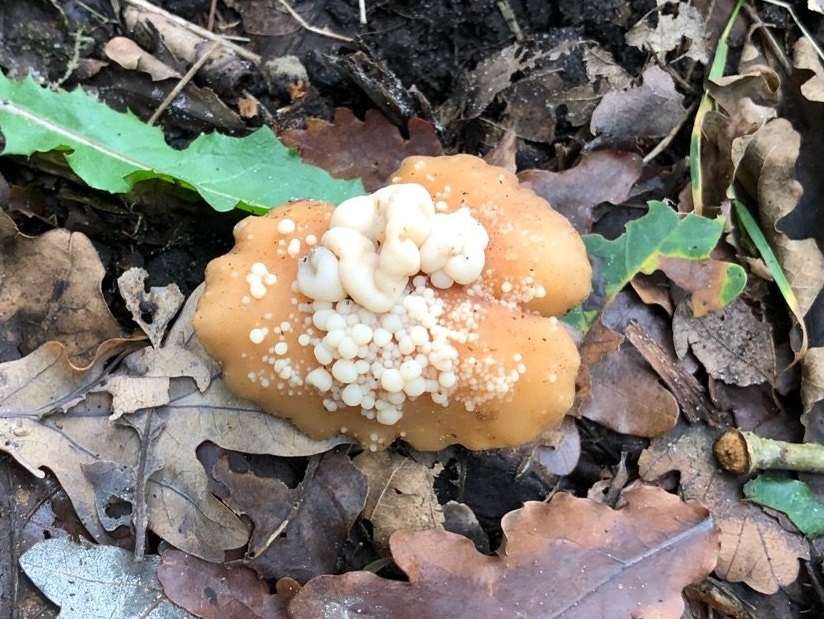
Syzygospora tumefaciens

- Syzygospora alba G.W.Martin (1937)
- Syzygospora effibulata (Ginns & Sunhede) Ginns (1986)
- Syzygospora lapponica Miettinen & Kotir. (2006)
- Syzygospora marasmoidea Ginns (1986)
- Syzygospora mycetophila (Peck) Ginns (1986)
- Syzygospora mycophaga (M.P.Christ.) Hauerslev (1996)
- Syzygospora nivalis Chee J.Chen, Oberw. & Z.C.Chen (1998)
- Syzygospora norvegica Ginns (1986)
- Syzygospora pallida (Hauerslev) Ginns (1986)
- Syzygospora parmeliicola Diederich (1996)
- Syzygospora septata Diederich & Etayo (2022)
- Syzygospora subsolida Ginns (1986)
- Syzygospora tumefaciens (Ginns & Sunhede) Ginns (1986)
