= Naganishia albida =

Scientific classification
- Kingdom: Fungi
- Division: Basidiomycota
- Class: Tremellomycetes
- Order: Filobasidiales
- Family: Filobasidiaceae
- Genus: Naganishia
- Species: N. albida

Binomial name
- Naganishia albida (Saito) X.Z. Liu, F.Y. Bai, M. Groenew. & Boekhout (2015)

Synonyms
- Torula albida Saito (1922); Torulopsis albida (Saito) Lodder (1934); Cryptococcus albidus (Saito) C.E. Skinner (1950); Rhodotorula albida (Saito) Galgoczy & E.K. Novák (1965); Cryptococcus kuetzingii Fell & Phaff (1967)

Species of fungus

Naganishia albida (synonym Cryptococcus albidus) is a species of fungus in the family Filobasidiaceae. It is currently only known from its yeast state. The species was originally isolated from the air in Japan, and has subsequently been isolated from dry moss in Portugal, grasshoppers in Portugal, and tubercular lungs.

== Description ==
Cultured colonies are cream to pale pink, the majority smooth with a mucoid appearance. Some are rough and wrinkled, but this is a rare occurrence. Naganishia albida is very similar to Cryptococcus neoformans, but can be differentiated because it is phenol oxidase-negative, and, when grown on Niger or birdseed agar, C. neoformans produces melanin, causing the cells to become brown, while N. albida cells stay cream. Microscopically, N. albida yeasts are ovoid and when viewed with India ink, a capsule is apparent. This species also reproduces through budding. The formation of pseudohyphae has not been seen. N. albida is able to use glucose, citric acid, maltose, sucrose, trehalose, salicin, cellobiose, and inositol, as well as many other compounds, as sole carbon sources. This species is also able to use potassium nitrate as a nitrogen source. Naganishia albida produces urease.

== Pathology ==
While this species is most frequently found in water and plants and is also found on animal and human skin, it is not a frequent human pathogen. Cases of N. albida infection have increased in humans during the past few years, and it has caused ocular and systemic disease in those with immunoincompetent systems, for example, patients with AIDS, leukemia, or lymphoma. While systemic infections have been found with increasing regularity in humans, it is still relatively rare in animals. The administration of amphotericin B in animals has been successful, but in humans, the treatment usually has poor results.
