= Pauesia grossa =

Scientific classification
- Domain: Eukaryota
- Kingdom: Animalia
- Phylum: Arthropoda
- Class: Insecta
- Order: Hymenoptera
- Family: Braconidae
- Subfamily: Aphidiinae
- Tribe: Aphidiini
- Genus: Pauesia
- Species: P. grossa

Binomial name
- Pauesia grossa (Fahringer, 1937)

Species of wasp

Pauesia grossa is a species of parasitoid wasp in the subfamily Aphidiinae. It is specific to a particular host, the black stem aphid (Cinara confinis), which feeds on the sap of coniferous trees, particularly firs (Abies).

Pauesia grossa was first described by the Austrian entomologist Josef Fahringer in 1937. It is known from Austria, the Czech Republic, Hungary, Switzerland and France. In 2014 it was first observed in the United Kingdom, being tentatively identified at the Bedgebury National Pinetum in Kent. With the increasing acreage of noble fir (Abies procera) being grown in Britain for use as Christmas trees, Cinara confinis is likely to become a more widespread pest, and the introduction of Pauesia grossa may prove important in controlling the aphid.
