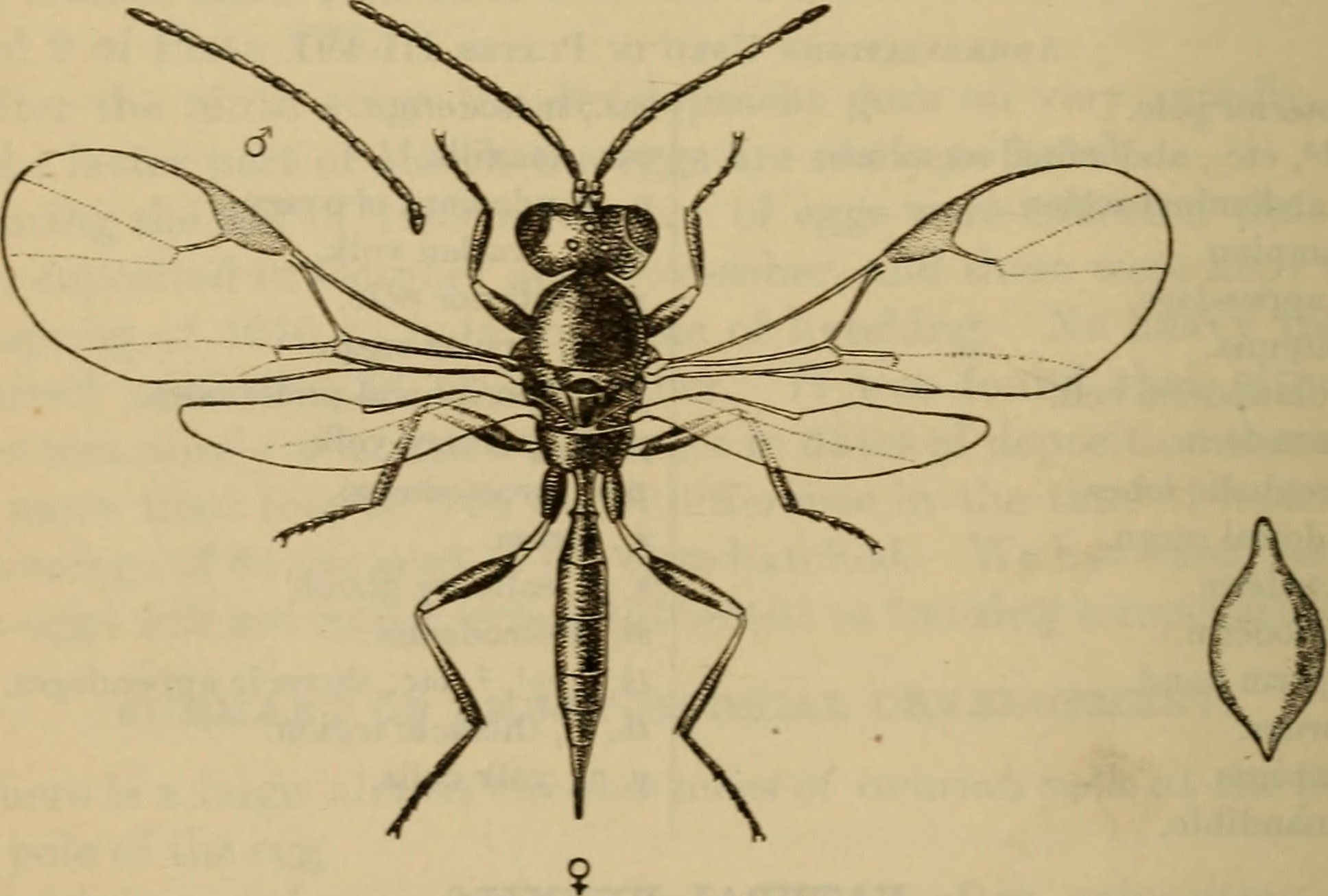
- Habitus

Scientific classification
- Kingdom: Animalia
- Phylum: Arthropoda
- Class: Insecta
- Order: Hymenoptera
- Family: Braconidae
- Genus: Lysiphlebus
- Species: L. testaceipes

Binomial name
- Lysiphlebus testaceipes Cresson, 1880

= Lysiphlebus testaceipes =

Species of wasp

Lysiphlebus testaceipes is a species of small braconid parasitoid wasp in the subfamily Aphidiinae. L. testaceipes can utilize numerous species of aphids as hosts and has often been used as a biological control agent against aphid pests. It is considered an invasive species in several European countries.

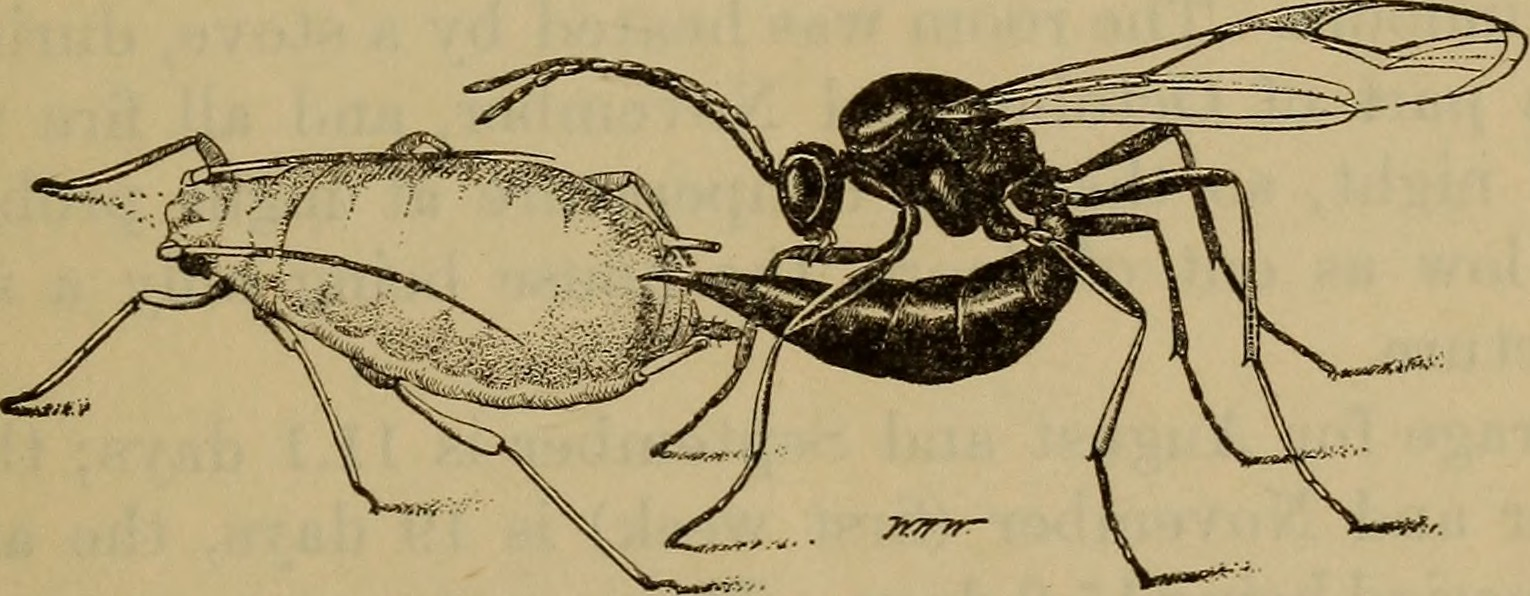
Lysephlebus testaceipes ovipositing in an aphid

== Description ==
L. testaceipes is a black wasp less than 3 mm in length with translucent wings. Females have short ovipositors. Due to their size, adults may be difficult to observe in the wild. Aphid mummies produced by this parasitoid appear as rounded and swollen aphids beige or tan in color. An exit hole may be visible on the aphid mummy if the adult wasp has emerged.

== Distribution ==
L. testaceipes is native to the southern United States and South America. This species was first introduced in Europe to Czechoslovakia in 1972 as a bio-control agent and can now be found on every continent except Antarctica. Following introduction to Europe, L. testaceipes spread relatively quickly along the Mediterranean coast to eventually cover the entire Mediterranean area. It has since then moved north to the foothills of the Pyrenees and has been found in Serbia as of 2013. Populations of this species were also recorded in the Alps up to 2200 m asl. In the United States, L. testaceipes has been found as far north as Wisconsin.

The ability of this species to spread into cooler areas led to its removal from the European Plant Protection Organization's list of positive biological control agents in 2008.

== Ecology ==
Like all members of Aphidiinae, L. testaceipes is a solitary, koinobiont endoparasitoid of aphids. This means that adult females lay a single egg inside of an aphid host. The egg hatches after two days and the larval wasp then develops inside the still living aphid. When the larva has finished feeding after 6 to 8 days, it kills the aphid, leaving the skin as a protective hardened shell, or mummy. The larva then cuts a hole in the bottom of the aphid mummy to attach it to the plant with silk. The larvae pupates within this mummy and exits after 4 or 5 days as an adult, chewing a hole in the top of the mummy. Developmental time can be influenced by temperature.

=== Hosts ===
L. testaceipes has a notably wide host range, exceeding 100 aphid species in several genera. Hosts include Aphis craccivora, Schizaphis graminum, Melanaphis sacchari and Myzus persicae.
