= C. phenolicus =

C. phenolicus may refer to:

- Cryptanaerobacter phenolicus, a bacterium species
- Cryptococcus phenolicus, a fungus species
