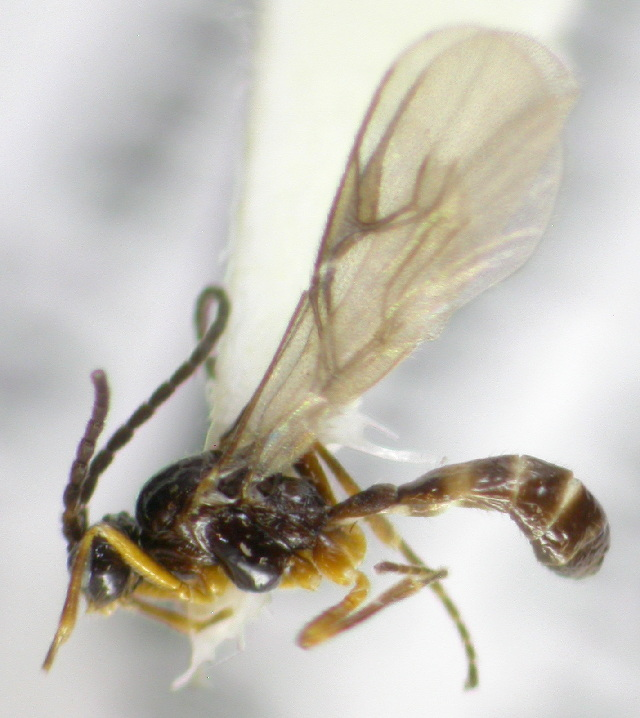
- Aphidius ervi

Scientific classification
- Domain: Eukaryota
- Kingdom: Animalia
- Phylum: Arthropoda
- Class: Insecta
- Order: Hymenoptera
- Family: Braconidae
- Subfamily: Aphidiinae
- Tribe: Aphidiini
- Genus: Aphidius; Esenbeck, 1818

= Aphidius =

Genus of wasps

Aphidius is a genus of insects of the family Braconidae.

The genus has a cosmopolitan distribution.

Adult Aphidius is a small wasp, usually less than 1/8 inch (3.2 mm) long. Aphidius wasps are endoparasitoids of aphids. The female wasp lays eggs in an aphid. When the eggs hatch, the wasp larvae feed on the inside of the aphid. As the larvae mature, the hosts die and become slightly enlarged or mummified, often becoming tan or yellow. Complete metamorphosis occurs within the host. The adult parasite chews the sugar out of the mummy leaving a hole.

The genus Aphidius includes many species that provide biological pest control of aphids on agricultural crops, greenhouses, urban landscape and home gardens.

== Species ==
- Aphidius absinthii Marshall, 1896
- Aphidius adelocarinus Smith, 1944
- Aphidius alius Muesebeck, 1958
- Aphidius apolloni
- Aphidius avenaphis Fitch
- Aphidius balcanicus Tomanović & Petrović, 2011
- Aphidius banksae Kittel
- Aphidius colemani (Dalman, 1820)
- Aphidius chaetosiphonis Tomanović &Petrović, 2011
- Aphidius ervi (Haliday, 1834)
- Aphidius linosiphonis Tomanovic & Starý, 2001
- Aphidius gifuensis Ashmead, 1906
- Aphidius matricariae (Haliday)
- Aphidius nigripes Ashmead, 1901
- Aphidius rhopalosiphi De Stefani Perez
- Aphidius transcaspicus Telenga, 1958
- Aphidius uzbekistanicus Luzhetzki
