= C. antarcticus =

C. antarcticus may refer to:

- Cryptococcus antarcticus, a fungus species
- Cryptopygus antarcticus, the Antarctic springtail, an arthropod species native to Antarctica and Australia
