= Naganishia =

Scientific classification
- Kingdom: Fungi
- Division: Basidiomycota
- Class: Tremellomycetes
- Order: Filobasidiales
- Family: Filobasidiaceae
- Genus: Naganishia; S. Goto (1963)

Type species
- Naganishia globosa S. Goto

Species
- Naganishia adeliensis N. albida N. albidosimilis N. antarctica N. bhutanensis N. cerealis N. diffluens N. friedmannii N. liquefaciens N. onofrii N. randhawae N. uzbekistanensis N. vaughanmartiniae N. vishniacii

Genus of fungi

Naganishia is a genus of fungi in the family Filobasidiaceae. Species are currently only known from their yeast states, most of which were formerly referred to the genus Cryptococcus. Some 15 species have been described worldwide. Naganishia albida is an occasional human pathogen.
