= Solicoccozyma phenolicus =

Scientific classification
- Kingdom: Fungi
- Division: Basidiomycota
- Class: Tremellomycetes
- Order: Filobasidiales
- Family: Piskurozymaceae
- Genus: Solicoccozyma
- Species: S. phenolicus

Binomial name
- Solicoccozyma phenolicus (Á. Fonseca, Scorzetti & Fell) A.M. Yurkov 2015

Synonyms
- Cryptococcus phenolicus

Species of fungus

Solicoccozyma phenolicus (synonym Cryptococcus phenolicus) is a fungus species in the family Piskurozymaceae, typically found in its yeast state.
