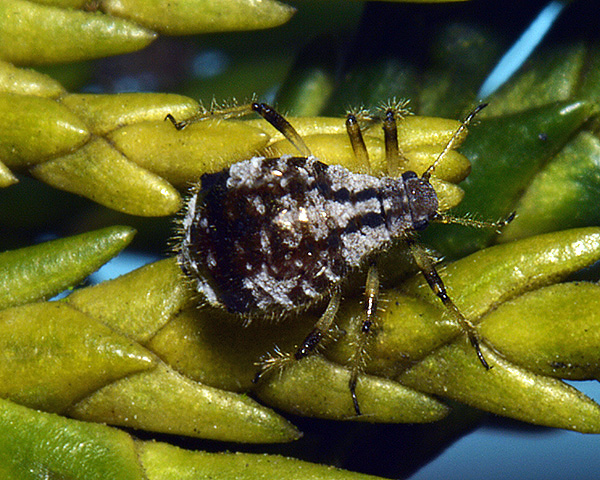

Scientific classification
- Kingdom: Animalia
- Phylum: Arthropoda
- Clade: Pancrustacea
- Class: Insecta
- Order: Hemiptera
- Suborder: Sternorrhyncha
- Family: Aphididae
- Genus: Cinara
- Species: C. cupressi

Binomial name
- Cinara cupressi (Buckton, 1881)

= Cinara cupressi =

Species of true bug

Cinara cupressi, the cypress aphid, is a brownish soft-bodied aphid. It sucks sap from twigs of conifers, and can cause damage to the tree, ranging from discoloring of the affected twig to the death of the tree. This insect appears to have originated in the Middle East and has been increasing its range and is considered to be an invasive species in Africa and Europe. It has been included in the List of the world's 100 worst invasive species.

== Taxonomy ==
This species was first described by George Bowdler Buckton in 1881 and originally named Lachnus cupressi.

Several species of aphid have been described on cypresses and related trees in various parts of the world. In North America, these are Cinara canadensis on Juniperus virginiana, Cinara sabinae on Juniperus sabina, and Cinara cupressi on Cupressaceae species in North America. C. cupressi was also described from Cupressaceae in the United Kingdom. The species Lachnus juniperinus was described from Poland on Juniperus communis and Thuja occidentalis, but all these species have since been synonymised with C. cupressi by many authors. The insect in Europe and the Middle East has been described as C. cupressi, the one in Africa as C. cupressivora while the one in North America has been described as C. sabinae. These species are not separable using morphological characters alone, and a determination as to whether they are valid species awaits molecular evidence. Meanwhile, the CABI Invasive Species Compendium includes them all under C. cupressi "sensu lato" (in the broadest sense).

== Description ==
Cinara cupressi is a small, soft-bodied insect reaching lengths of between 1.8 and 3.9 mm (0.07 and 0.15 in) for apterous (wingless) females. It is orangish to yellowish-brown with black markings, lightly dusted on the dorsal surface with pale grey wax. On the thorax the black bands are longitudinal, but are transverse on the abdomen with a rather larger blacker patch between the siphunculi. The whole insect is clad in fine short hairs. The alate (winged) female has a blackish thorax, prominent black siphunculi and membranous wings.

== Distribution ==
It seems that this aphid may have originated in eastern Greece and to the south of the Caspian Sea, with Cupressus sempervirens being the original host. However, it is an invasive species and is now found in many other parts of the world. In Europe it reached Italy by 1978, Belgium and France by 1980, Bulgaria by 1988 and Portugal by 1996. Populations in different parts have regional preferences in host species, being recorded in Europe on several species of Cupressus, Juniperus scopulorum, Juniperus virginiana, Thuja occidentalis and Thuja plicata.

In the Middle East it had reached Israel by 1980, Jordan by 1987 and Yemen by 1999. In Africa it had arrived in Malawi by 1986, Kenya and Zimbabwe by 1990, South Africa by 1993, and Libya and Morocco by 1994. It was present in Colombia in South America by 1991 and by 2000 had reached Brazil.

== Life cycle ==
In colder climates, winged males and sexual females are produced in the autumn, with eggs being laid in crevices in the bark to overwinter. In warmer climates, wingless females produce nymphs asexually by parthenogenesis all year round. In Italy, there are up to 12 generations per year, individual insects living for about 22 days and having an average of 23 offspring. Fecundity is higher at higher temperatures. Periodically, winged forms are produced as a result of overcrowding or other environmental factors. These can fly strongly and can be carried by the wind for considerable distances to infest new host trees.

== Ecology ==
These aphids are well-camouflaged and the wingless females tend to aggregate. They are found on small green twigs, older brown twigs and small woody branches. They prefer shady locations in the lower parts of the canopy, sometimes reaching densities of 80 insects per 10 cm (4 in) of branch. The insects feed by pushing their mouthparts into the bark and sucking out the sap. Their saliva causes a phytotoxic reaction in the phloem tissue in the twig which becomes necrotic. With the sap failing to reach the tips of the twigs, they may wither. The excess fluid sucked by the aphids is secreted by the aphids as honeydew, on which sooty mould often develops, and which attracts ants. The ants sometimes carry aphid nymphs to other parts of the tree which thus become infested. When the weather gets hot, the aphids move down to the ground to avoid the heat.

== Damage and control ==
Mild attacks cause discolouring and death of shoots while severe infestations can kill the tree. The sooty mould on the honeydew slows tree growth by impairing photosynthesis. Treatment to kill the aphids needs to be undertaken at an early stage of the infestation before populations have built up. It may be undertaken in hedges or ornamental trees, but is impracticable for large trees, in forests and plantations. The aphids can be a vector for cypress canker, a fungal disease that can cause die-back and death of cypress trees.

One species particularly susceptible to damage by the aphids is Cupressus lusitanica, which is widely grown in Kenya as a plantation crop. Natural enemies of the aphid include parasitoid wasps in the genus Pauesia, and some of these have been considered for use in biological pest control.
