= Filobasidium =

Scientific classification
- Kingdom: Fungi
- Division: Basidiomycota
- Class: Tremellomycetes
- Order: Filobasidiales
- Family: Filobasidiaceae
- Genus: Filobasidium; L.S.Olive (1986)

Type species
- Filobasidium floriforme L.S.Olive

Species
- Filobasidium chernovii F. elegans F. globisporum F. magnum F. oeirense F. stepposum F. uniguttulatum F. wieringae

Genus of fungi

Filobasidium is a genus of fungi in the family Filobasidiaceae. Most species are only known from their yeast states, but some produce hyphae with haustorial cells, indicating that they are parasites of other fungi. Basidia are tubular with terminal, sessile basidiospores. Basidiocarps (fruit bodies) are not formed.

Filobasidium uniguttulatum (formerly Cryptococcus uniguttulatus) is, rarely, a human pathogen in its yeast state, causing meningitis.

Filobasidium floriforme may be of interest in biotechnological applications. It shows an ability to produce lipases which could be used in biofuel production.
