= Solicoccozyma =

Scientific classification
- Kingdom: Fungi
- Division: Basidiomycota
- Class: Tremellomycetes
- Order: Filobasidiales
- Family: Piskurozymaceae
- Genus: Solicoccozyma; X.Z. Liu, F.Y. Bai, M. Groenew. & Boekhout (2015)

Type species
- Solicoccozyma aeria (Saito) X.Z. Liu, F.Y. Bai, M. Groenew. & Boekhout

Species
- S. aquatica S. fuscescens S. gelidoterrea S. keelungensis S. phenolicus S. terrea S. terricola S. zizaniae

Genus of fungi

Solicoccozyma is a genus of fungi in the family Piskurozymaceae. Species have only been isolated in their yeast states, several of which were formerly referred to the genus Cryptococcus, but can produce filamentous states with basidia in culture. Nine species have been described worldwide.
