= Binodoxys communis =

Scientific classification
- Kingdom: Animalia
- Phylum: Arthropoda
- Clade: Pancrustacea
- Class: Insecta
- Order: Hymenoptera
- Family: Braconidae
- Genus: Binodoxys
- Species: B. communis

Binomial name
- Binodoxys communis (Gahan, 1926)

Species of wasp

Binodoxys communis is a parasitoid wasp of the genus Binodoxys. The genus Binodoxys is included in the subfamily Aphidiinae which are noted parasitoids of aphids.

== Description ==
The adults of Binodoxys communis are approximately 1.2 mm in length. This small braconid wasp has a brown head, antennae, legs, and thorax. The wing venation is brown and the wings are nearly hyaline. The first tergite, trochanters, and the base of the tibiae are yellow. The rest of the abdomen is brown. Ovipositor sheaths and prongs are relatively lighter in color.

== Economic value ==
Binodoxys communis was released in the United States prior to 1979 to control Aphis gossypii (Glover), but establishment resulting from that release was questionable. Binodoxys communis was vetted and released in the United States again in 2007 to control the soybean aphid, Aphis glycines Matsumura. Establishment of B. communis throughout the United States has been questionable, likely due to reduced aphid population because of fungal pathogens, competition with other species of parasitoids, and prophylactic usage of pesticides.
