= Aphidius nigripes =

Scientific classification
- Domain: Eukaryota
- Kingdom: Animalia
- Phylum: Arthropoda
- Class: Insecta
- Order: Hymenoptera
- Family: Braconidae
- Subfamily: Aphidiinae
- Tribe: Aphidiini
- Genus: Aphidius
- Species: A. nigripes

Binomial name
- Aphidius nigripes Ashmead, 1901

Species of wasp

Aphidius nigripes is a species of parasitoid wasp in the subfamily Aphidiinae of the family Braconidae. It is the most common parasitoid of the potato aphid Macrosiphum euphorbiae in eastern North America. Many other species of aphids may also serve as hosts.

== Ecology ==
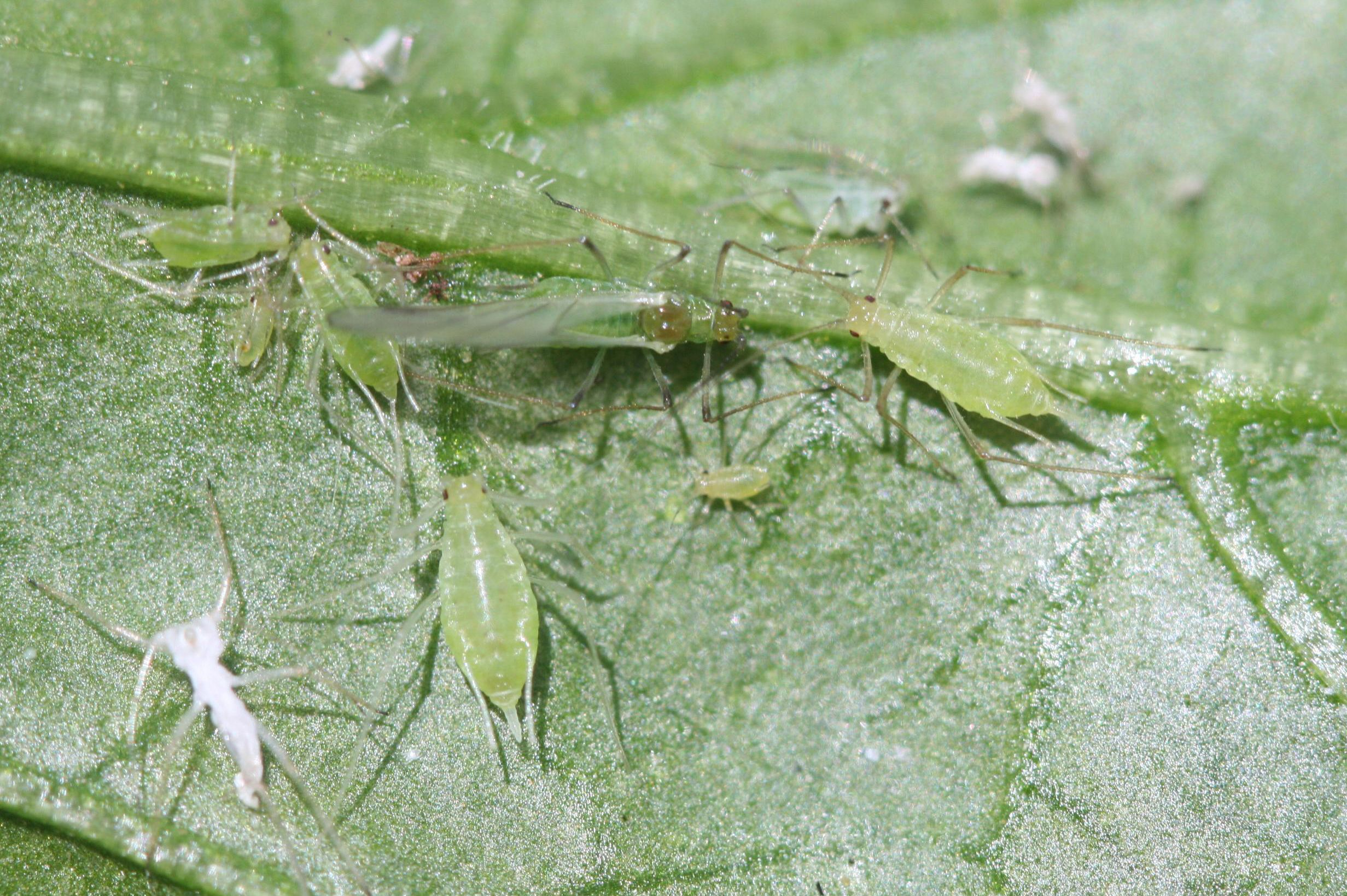
The potato aphid (Macrosiphum euphorbiae)

Adult A. nigripes emerge in the spring and find M. euphorbiae hosts before the aphid moves from its winter food plant, or primary host plant. Around June, the aphid moves to its secondary host, the potato, and the wasp accompanies it.

Female Aphidius nigripes emit pheromones soon after emerging from their pupa to attract winged males. The female mates only once, storing the sperm. She oviposits eggs into the immature stages of the potato aphid. Like other haplodiploid insects, she can control the sex of her offspring by laying a fertilized (female) egg or an unfertilized (male) egg. There is a trend for A. nigripes to preferentially allocate unfertilized male eggs to the earlier, smaller instars of aphids. Later stage instar aphids are predominantly used as hosts for female offspring. This arrangement is advantageous to the wasp because the energetic requirements for the female in finding aphid hosts and laying eggs is greater than that required by the male. Size is not important for male success in mating; small and large males produce similar numbers of progeny.

The developing wasp larvae feed on the tissues of their hosts, avoiding the vital organs as far as possible. When the wasp larvae are nearly ready to emerge, they alter the behavior of their hosts in different ways depending on the time of year. Those that are ready to emerge early in the season cause their host aphids to climb onto the upper surfaces of leaves. This leads to faster development of the wasp pupa due to increased temperature and decreases their risk of hyperparasitism. Larvae completing their development late in the year cause the aphids to crawl downwards and find concealed spots. Here the wasp larva forms a cocoon inside the hollowed-out body of the host, spends the winter as a diapausing larva called a prepupa, and pupates in the spring to continue its life cycle.
