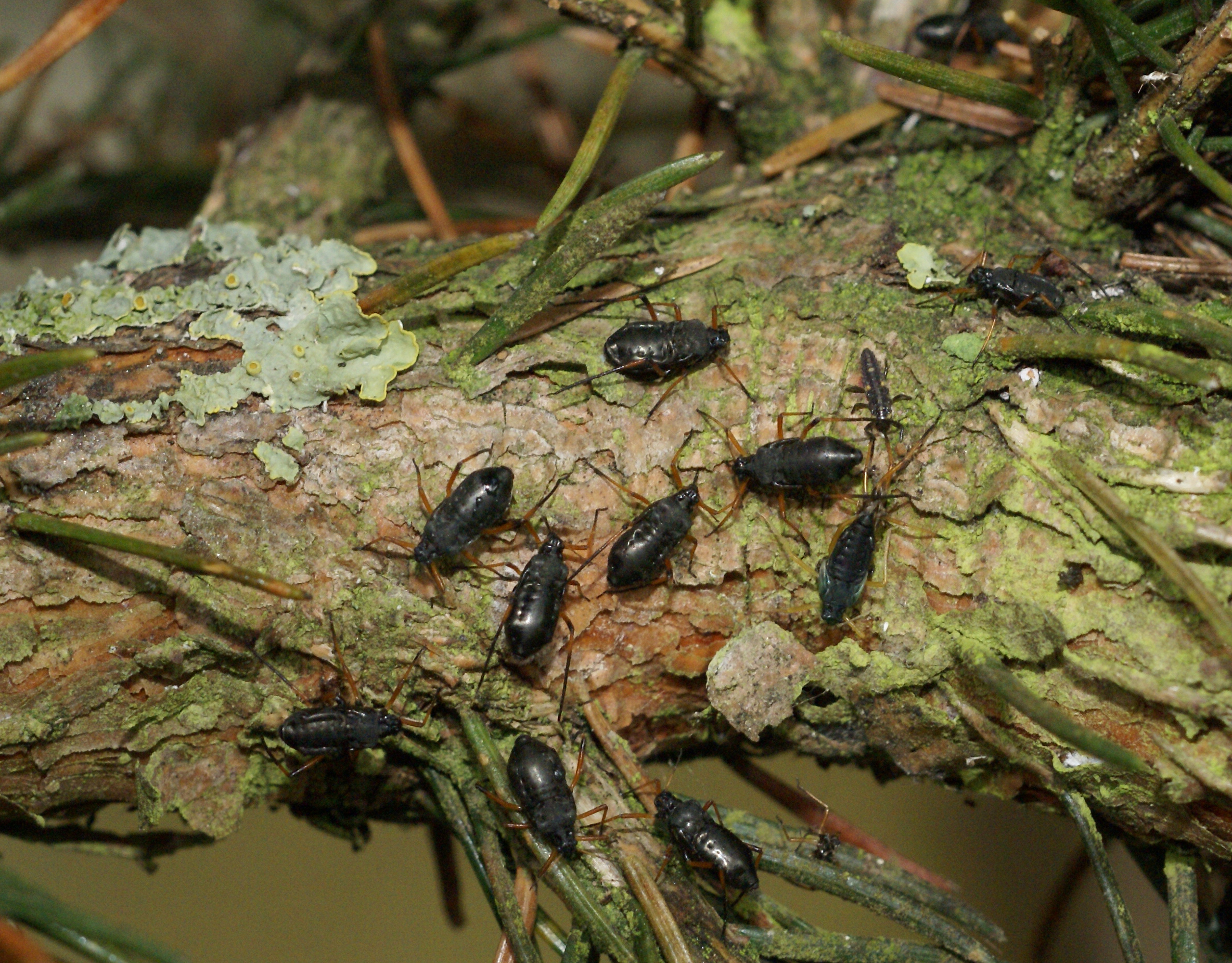
- Cinara piceae

Scientific classification
- Domain: Eukaryota
- Kingdom: Animalia
- Phylum: Arthropoda
- Class: Insecta
- Order: Hemiptera
- Suborder: Sternorrhyncha
- Family: Aphididae
- Subfamily: Lachninae
- Genus: Cinara; Curtis, 1835

Species
- 243, see text

= Cinara =

Genus of true bugs

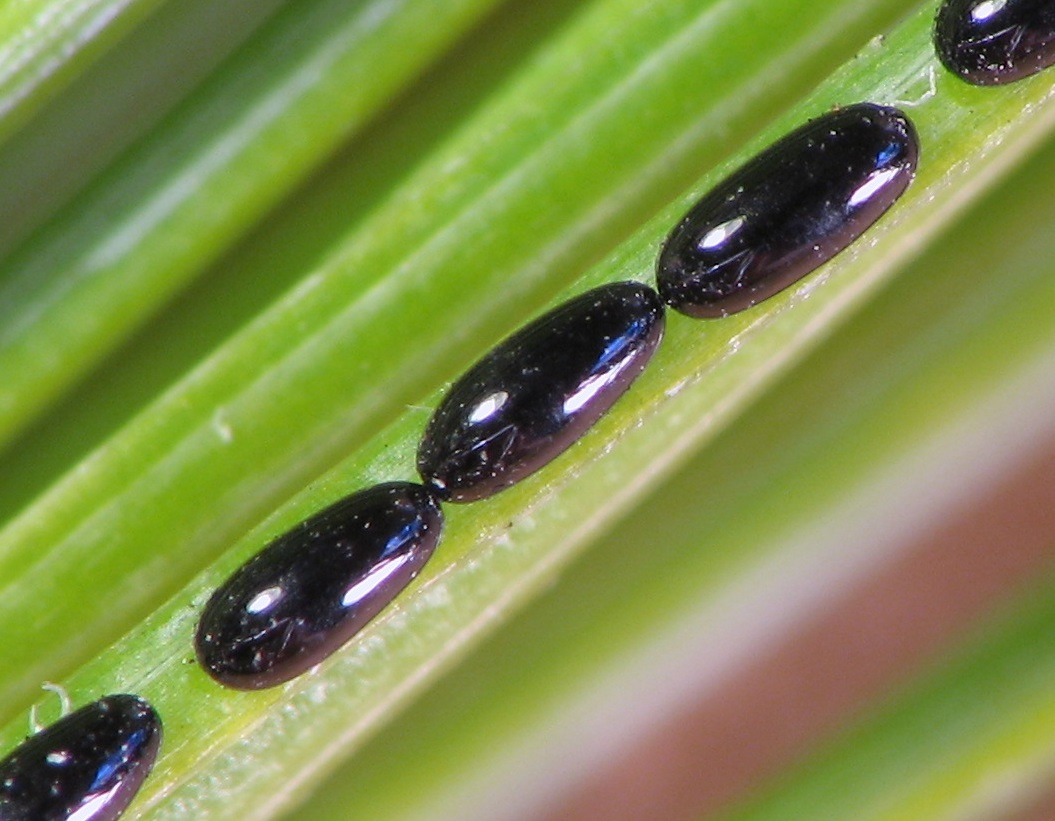
Eggs of Cinara strobi on Eastern white pine

Cinara, the conifer aphids or giant conifer aphids, is a genus of aphids in the family Aphididae. They are widespread in the Northern Hemisphere.

These aphids specialize on conifers in the pine and cypress families.

Some species are pests that attack cultivated Christmas trees. The parasitoid wasp species in the genus Pauesia are specific to the genus.

Cinara cedri has been shown to host three symbionts: Buchnera aphidicola, a secondary symbiont, and bacteria in the genus Wolbachia.

There are about 243 species in this genus.

Species include:

- Cinara abietis
- Cinara acutirostris
- Cinara cedri
- Cinara confinis
- Cinara cupressi
- Cinara fornacula
- Cinara laricis
- Cinara piceae
- Cinara piceicola
- Cinara pini
- Cinara pilicornis
- Cinara strobi
