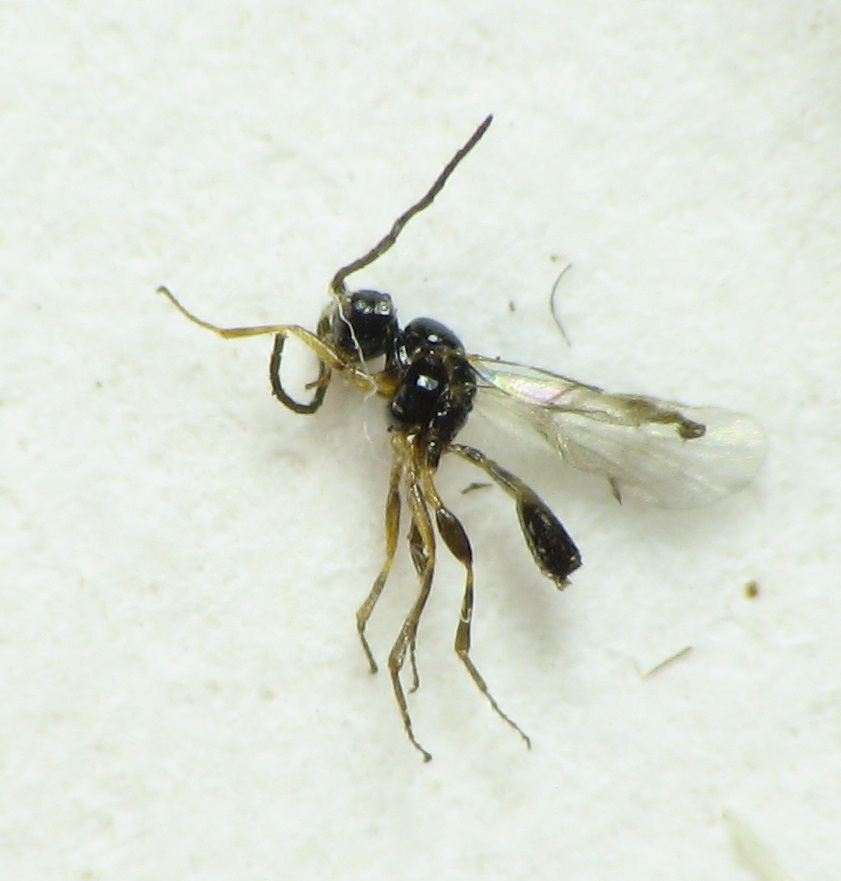

Scientific classification
- Kingdom: Animalia
- Phylum: Arthropoda
- Clade: Pancrustacea
- Class: Insecta
- Order: Hymenoptera
- Family: Braconidae
- Subfamily: Aphidiinae
- Genus: Lysiphlebus; Förster, 1862

= Lysiphlebus =

Genus of wasps

Lysiphlebus is a genus of parasitoid wasps belonging to the family Braconidae.

The genus has a near cosmopolitan distribution.

Species:

- Lysiphlebus alpinus Stary, 1971
- Lysiphlebus balcanicus Stary, 1998
- Lysiphlebus cardui Marshall, 1896
- Lysiphlebus confusus Tremblay & Eady, 1978
- Lysiphlebus fabarum Marshall, 1896
- Lysiphlebus testaceipes Cresson, 1880

== Reproduction ==
Most Lysiphlebus species are haplodiploid, like other Hymenoptera. However, all-female lineages are common in some Lysiphlebus-taxa including L. fabarum, L. cardui and L. confusus.

In these asexual lineages, females can reproduce by a parthenogenetic mechanism, i.e. thelytoky, that involves automixis with central fusion.

The genetic system underlying sex determination in Lysiphlebus is "complementary sex determination", similar to the cape honey bee (see Haplodiploidy § Sex determination in honey bees). Unlike honey bees, however, the Lysiphlebus complementary sex determiner gene is thought to be present in multiple copies.

Asexual females may occasionally produce diploid males, which when mated with sexual females, can convert sexual into asexual lineages, a process which has been dubbed "contagious parthenogenesis".

== Ecology ==
Like other Aphidiinae, Lysiphlebus are endoparasitoids of aphids. They lay their eggs inside the body of aphids, where their larvae develop, eventually spinning a mummy-like cocoon inside its remains.

Most Lysiphlebus species specialize in attacking ant-defended aphid colonies. They avoid attack by the ants through chemical mimicry of the aphid cuticular hydrocarbons.
