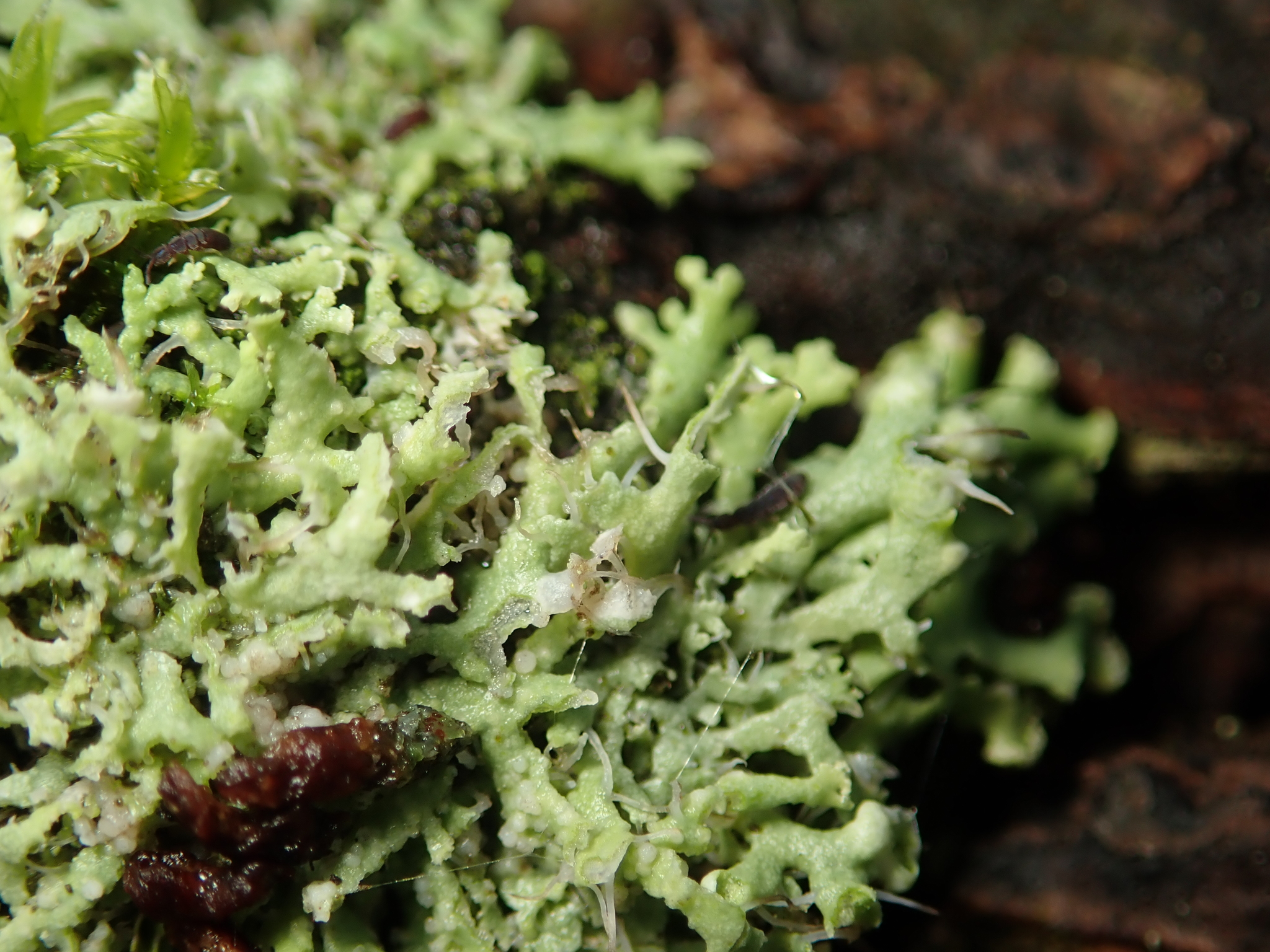
- Zyzygomyces physciacearum

Scientific classification
- Kingdom: Fungi
- Division: Basidiomycota
- Class: Tremellomycetes
- Order: Filobasidiales
- Family: Filobasidiaceae
- Genus: Zyzygomyces; Diederich, Millanes & Wedin, 2022

= Zyzygomyces =

Genus of fungi

Zyzygomyces is a genus of fungi in the family Filobasidiaceae.

It has the following species:

- Zyzygomyces aipoliae Diederich, Millanes, F.Berger & Ertz
- Zyzygomyces bachmannii (Diederich & M.S.Christ.) Diederich & Millanes
- Zyzygomyces bunodophori Dierderich, Etayo & Palice
- Zyzygomyces leucodermiae Diederich, Millanes, Ertz, Etayo & Flakus
- Zyzygomyces mobergii Diederich & Millanes
- Zyzygomyces physciacearum (Diederich) Diederich, Millanes & Wedin
- Zyzygomyces physconiae Diederich, Millanes, P.Pinault & Brackel
- Zyzygomyces polyblastidii Diederich, Flakus, Etayo & Rodr.Flakus
