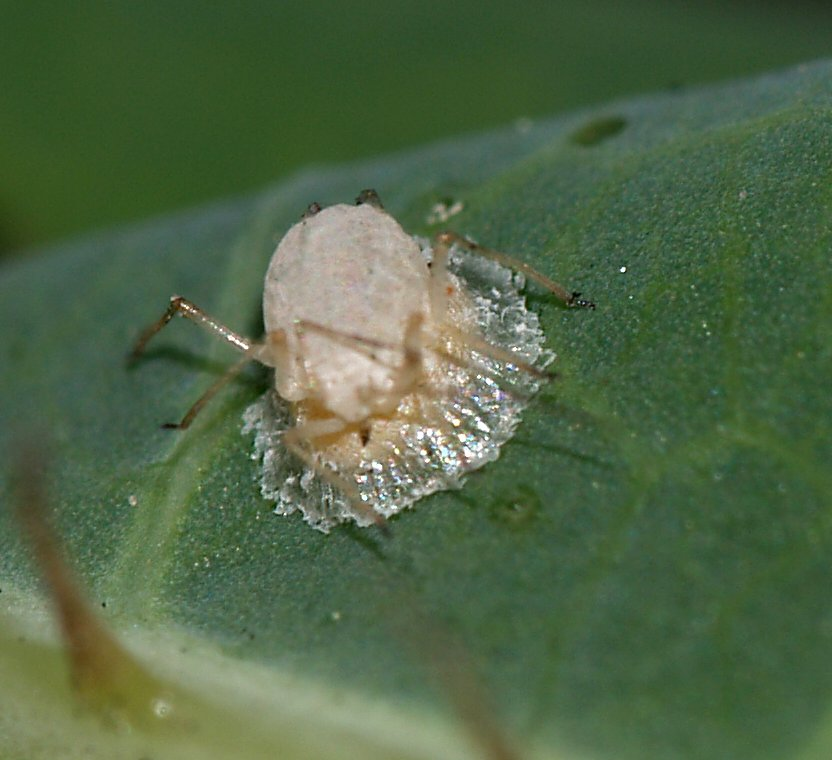

Scientific classification
- Kingdom: Animalia
- Phylum: Arthropoda
- Class: Insecta
- Order: Hymenoptera
- Family: Braconidae
- Subfamily: Aphidiinae
- Genus: Praon; Haliday, 1833

= Praon =

Genus of wasps

Praon is a genus of wasp in the family Braconidae. There are at least 70 described species in Praon.

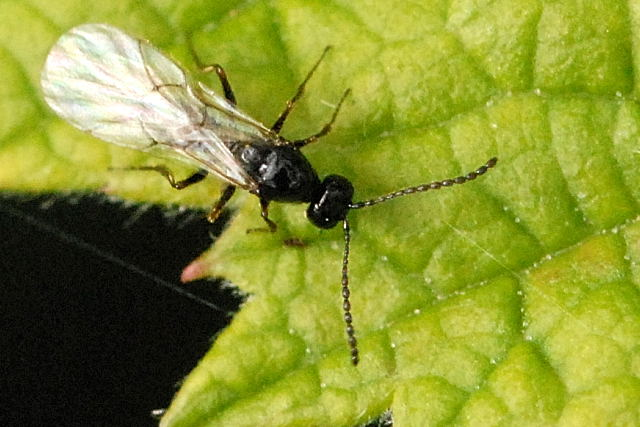
Praon abjectum

== Species ==
These 75 species belong to the genus Praon:

- Praon abjectum (Haliday, 1833)^{c g}
- Praon alaskense Ashmead, 1902^{c g}
- Praon americanum (Ashmead, 1889)^{c g}
- Praon artemisaphis Smith, 1944^{c g}
- Praon artemisicola Pike & Stary, 1997^{c g}
- Praon athenaeum Kavallieratos & Lykouressis, 2000^{c g}
- Praon baodingense (Ji & Zhang, 1992)^{c g}
- Praon barbatum Mackauer, 1967^{c g}
- Praon bicolor Mackauer, 1959^{c g}
- Praon bicolour Mackauer, 1959^{g}
- Praon brachycerum (Ji & Zhang, 1992)^{c g}
- Praon brevepetiolatum Chiriac, 1996^{c g}
- Praon brevistigma van Achterberg, 2006^{c g}
- Praon callaphis Mackauer & Sullivan, 1982^{c g}
- Praon capitophori Takada, 1968^{c}
- Praon caricicola Mackauer, 1967^{c g}
- Praon carinum Johnson, 1987^{c g}
- Praon cavariellae Stary, 1971^{c g}
- Praon cerasaphis (Fitch, 1855)^{c g}
- Praon changbaishanense Shi, 2001^{c g}
- Praon coloradense Ashmead, 1890^{c g}
- Praon coniforme Pike & Stary, 2000^{c g}
- Praon coreanum Takada, 1979^{c g}
- Praon dorsale (Haliday, 1833)^{c g}
- Praon exoletum (Nees, 1811)^{g}
- Praon exsoletum (Nees, 1811)^{c g}
- Praon flavicorne Stary, 1971^{c g}
- Praon flavinode (Haliday, 1833)^{c g}
- Praon fulvum Pike & Stary, 2000^{c g}
- Praon gallicum Stary, 1971^{c g}
- Praon helleni (Stary, 1981)^{c g}
- Praon himalayense Das & Chakrabarti, 1989^{c g}
- Praon hubeiense Chen & Shi, 1999^{c g}
- Praon humulaphidis Ashmead, 1889^{c g}
- Praon hyperomyzus Saha, Poddar, Das, Agarwala & Raychaudhuri, 1982^{c g}
- Praon kashmirense Bhagat, 1982^{c g}
- Praon kurohimense (Takada, 1968)^{c g}
- Praon latgerinae Stary & Remaudiere, 1982^{c g}
- Praon lemantinum Gautier, 1922^{c g}
- Praon lepelleyi Waterston, 1926^{c g}
- Praon longicorne Marshall, 1896^{c g}
- Praon megourae Stary, 1971^{c g}
- Praon minor Stary, 1971^{c g}
- Praon mollitrichosiphi Agarwala, Saha & Mahapatra, 1987^{c g}
- Praon muyuense Shi, 2001^{c g}
- Praon necans Mackauer, 1959^{c g}
- Praon nipponicum (Takada, 1968)^{c}
- Praon nonveilleri Tomanovic & Kavallieratos, 2003^{c g}
- Praon occidentale Baker, 1909^{c g}
- Praon orientale Stary & Schlinger, 1967^{c g}
- Praon orpheusi Kavallieratos, Athanassiou & Tomanovic, 2003^{c g}
- Praon pakistanum Kirkland, 1979^{c g}
- Praon pequodorum Viereck, 1917^{c g}
- Praon pilosum (Mackauer, 1959)^{c g}
- Praon pisiaphis Chou & Xiang, 1982^{c g}
- Praon prunaphis Chou & Xiang, 1982^{c g}
- Praon pubescens Stary, 1961^{c g}
- Praon quadratum Stary & Schlinger, 1967^{c g}
- Praon retusae Tomanovic & Kavallieratos, 2002^{c g}
- Praon rhopalosiphum Takada, 1968^{c g}
- Praon rosaecola Stary, 1961^{c g}
- Praon silvestre Stary, 1971^{c g}
- Praon simulans (Provancher, 1886)^{c g}
- Praon spinosum Mackauer, 1959^{c g}
- Praon stagona Takada & Rishi, 1980^{c g}
- Praon staryi Kavallieratos & Lykouressis, 2000^{c g}
- Praon taisetsuzanum Takada, 1968^{c g}
- Praon thailandicum (Stary, 2008)^{c g}
- Praon thalictri Stary, 1985^{c g}
- Praon unicum Smith, 1944^{c g}
- Praon unitum Mescheloff & Rosen, 1989^{c g}
- Praon uroleucon Tomanovic & Kavallieratos, 2003^{c g}
- Praon volucre (Haliday, 1833)^{c g}
- Praon yakimanum Pike & Stary, 1995^{c g}
- Praon yomenae Takada, 1968^{c g}

Data sources: i = ITIS, c = Catalogue of Life, g = GBIF, b = Bugguide.net
