= Binodoxys =

Scientific classification
- Kingdom: Animalia
- Phylum: Arthropoda
- Class: Insecta
- Order: Hymenoptera
- Family: Braconidae
- Subtribe: Trioxina
- Genus: Binodoxys; Mackauer, 1960

Species
- See text

Genus of insects

Binodoxys is a genus of parasitoid wasp of the subfamily Aphidiinae which are noted parasitoids of aphids. Its species generally prey on aphids which live on herbaceous plants.

== Species ==
The following species are accepted within Binodoxys:

- Binodoxys acalephae (Marshall, 1896)
- Binodoxys achalensis Stary, 2004
- Binodoxys acyrthosiphonis (Stary, 1983)
- Binodoxys angelicae (Haliday, 1833)
  - Binodoxys angelicae sikkimensis (Raychaudhuri, Samanta, Pramanik, Tamili & Sarkar, 1990)
- Binodoxys angolensis (Stary & Harten, 1977)
- Binodoxys basicurvus (Shuja-Uddin, 1973)
- Binodoxys basituber (Stary & Remaudiere, 1982)
- Binodoxys benoiti (Mackauer, 1959)
- Binodoxys brevicornis (Haliday, 1833)
- Binodoxys brunnescens (Stary & Schlinger, 1967)
- Binodoxys carinatus (Stary & Schlinger, 1967)
- Binodoxys carolinensis (Smith, 1944)
- Binodoxys centaureae (Haliday, 1833)
- Binodoxys ceratovacunae (Agarwala, Saha & Mahapatra, 1987)
- Binodoxys chilensis (Stary, 1995)
- Binodoxys clydesmithi Pike & Stary, 1996
- Binodoxys communis (Gahan, 1926)
- Binodoxys conei Pike & Stary, 1995
- Binodoxys coruscanigrans (Gahan, 1911)
- Binodoxys crudelis (Rondani, 1848)
- Binodoxys cupressicola (Gahan, 1911)
- Binodoxys equatus (Samanta, Tamili & Raychaudhuri, 1985)
- Binodoxys eutrichosiphi (Stary, 1975)
- Binodoxys genistae (Mackauer, 1960)
- Binodoxys gossypiaphis Chou & Xiang, 1982
- Binodoxys grafi Pike & Stary, 1996
- Binodoxys greenideae (Stary & Harten, 1983)
- Binodoxys harinhalai Stary, 2005
- Binodoxys heraclei (Haliday, 1833)
- Binodoxys hirsutus (Wang & Dong, 1993)
- Binodoxys hirticaudatus (Stary, 1983)
- Binodoxys hyperomyzi (Stary, 1983)
- Binodoxys impatientini (Stary & Remaudiere, 1983)
- Binodoxys indicus (Subba Rao & Sharma, 1958)
- Binodoxys jaii (Bhagat, 1982)
- Binodoxys joshimathensis (Das & Chakrabarti, 1989)
- Binodoxys kashmirensis Takada & Rishi, 1980
- Binodoxys kelloggensis Pike, Stary & Brewer, 2007
- Binodoxys kumaonensis (Stary & Raychaudhuri, 1982)
- Binodoxys letifer (Haliday, 1833)
- Binodoxys longispinus (Shuja-Uddin, 1983)
- Binodoxys mackaueri (Das & Chakrabarti, 1989)
- Binodoxys madagascariensis Stary, 2005
- Binodoxys manipurensis (Paonam & Singh, 1986)
- Binodoxys micromyzellae (Stary, 1985)
- Binodoxys mongolicus Takada, 1979
- Binodoxys nearctaphidis Mackauer, 1965
- Binodoxys nungbaensis (Paonam & Singh, 1986)
- Binodoxys odinae Paik, 1976
- Binodoxys oregmae (Agarwala, Saha & Mahapatra, 1987)
- Binodoxys palmerae (Smith, 1944)
- Binodoxys pterastheniae (Stary & Remaudiere, 1977)
- Binodoxys rhagii (Ashmead, 1889)
- Binodoxys rubicola (Shuja-Uddin, 1973)
- Binodoxys shillongensis (Stary, 1978)
- Binodoxys silvaticus (Stary, 1972)
- Binodoxys silvicola (Stary, 1972)
- Binodoxys similis (Mackauer, 1959)
- Binodoxys sinensis Mackauer, 1962
- Binodoxys solitarius (Stary, 1983)
- Binodoxys spiraea (Dong & Wang, 1993)
- Binodoxys staryi Davidian, 2007
- Binodoxys struma (Gahan, 1926)
- Binodoxys takecallis (Das & Chakrabarti, 1989)
- Binodoxys tamaliae (Stary & Remaudiere, 1983)
- Binodoxys tobiasi (Davidian, 2004)
- Binodoxys tomentosae (Das & Chakrabarti, 1990)
- Binodoxys toxopterae (Takada, 1966)
- Binodoxys trichosiphae (Samanta & Raychaudhuri, 1990)
- Binodoxys tucumanus (Tobias, 1987)
