= Cinara pilicornis =

Scientific classification
- Kingdom: Animalia
- Phylum: Arthropoda
- Clade: Pancrustacea
- Class: Insecta
- Order: Hemiptera
- Suborder: Sternorrhyncha
- Family: Aphididae
- Genus: Cinara
- Species: C. pilicornis

Binomial name
- Cinara pilicornis (Hartig, 1841)

Synonyms
- Aphis pilicornis Walker. 1852; Cinaropsis pilicornis Heinze. 1962

Species of true bug

Cinara pilicornis, the spruce shoot aphid or brown spruce shoot aphid, is an aphid species in the genus Cinara found on Norway spruce (Picea abies) and Sitka spruce (Picea sitchensis). It is a quite large aphid species with a plump, dull brown body. It seems to have little effect on the tree. It is a European species but it has also been reported in spruce forests in New Zealand, together with the spruce aphid (Elatobium abietinum).

Cinara pilicornis, which is attended by the honeydew-collecting ants Formica polyctena, is seldom attacked by the parasitoid wasp Pauesia pini. It is also a host for Entomophthora fungi.

Cinara pilicornis produces the trisaccharide melezitose. Citronellol, cis–trans-nepetalactone and cis–trans-nepetalactol are stress-induced compounds released by the host plant. These compounds originated from the aphids and they are assumed to be pheromone components for this aphid species.
