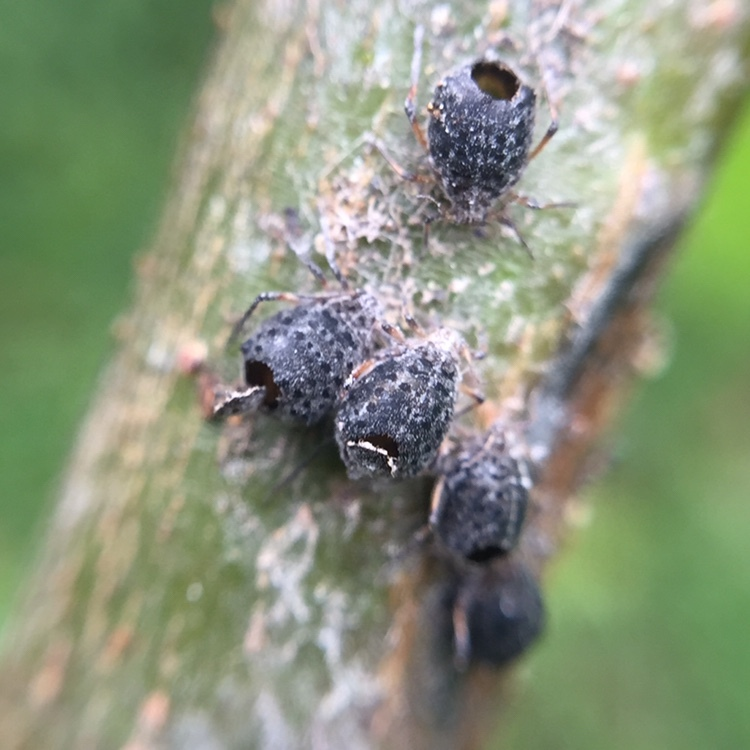
- Aphid Tuberolachnus salignus parasitized by Pauesia nigrovaria

Scientific classification
- Kingdom: Animalia
- Phylum: Arthropoda
- Clade: Pancrustacea
- Class: Insecta
- Order: Hymenoptera
- Family: Braconidae
- Subfamily: Aphidiinae
- Tribe: Aphidiini
- Genus: Pauesia; Quilis, 1931

Type species
- Pauesia albuferensis Quilis, 1931

= Pauesia =

Genus of wasps

Pauesia is a genus of parasitoid wasps in the subfamily Aphidiinae. The species in the genus use the conifer aphids (genus Cinara) as their host.

Pauesia anatolica is a parasitoid of the cedar aphid Cinara cedri, and Pauesia grossa is a parasitoid of the black stem aphid (Cinara confinis).
