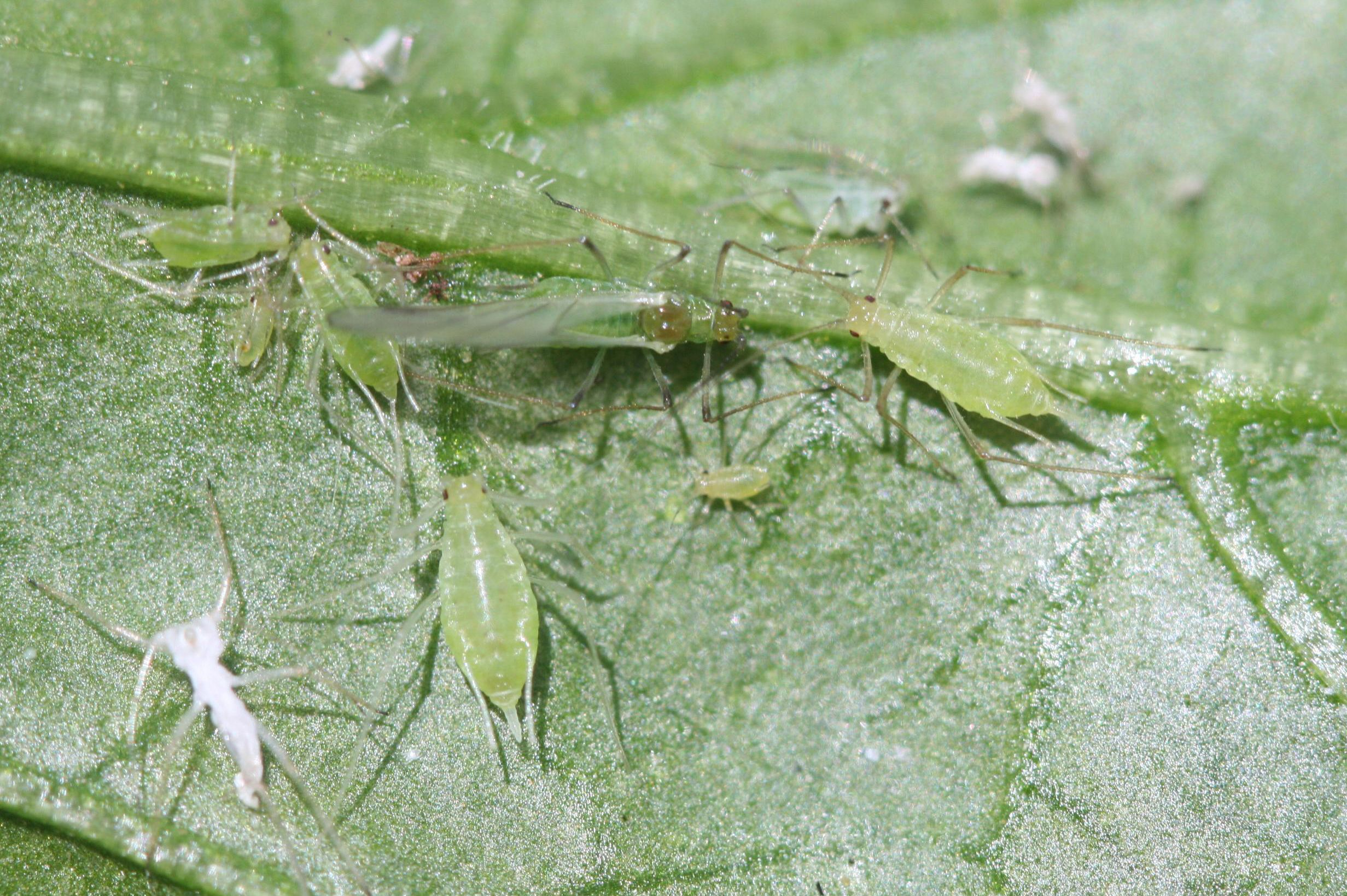
- Winged and wingless potato aphids and cast skins

Scientific classification
- Kingdom: Animalia
- Phylum: Arthropoda
- Clade: Pancrustacea
- Class: Insecta
- Order: Hemiptera
- Suborder: Sternorrhyncha
- Family: Aphididae
- Genus: Macrosiphum
- Species: M. euphorbiae

Binomial name
- Macrosiphum euphorbiae (Thomas, 1878)

Synonyms
- Illinoia solanifolii; Macrosiphon solanifolii Ashmead; Macrosiphum amygdaloides; Macrosiphum cyprissiae var. cucurbitae del Guercio; Macrosiphum euphorbiellum Theobald; Macrosiphum koehleri Börner; Macrosiphum solanifolii (Ashmead); Macrosiphum tabaci Pergande; Macrosiphum rosaeollae Theobald; Nectarophora ascepiadis Cowen ex Gillette & Baker; Nectarophora heleniella Cockerell; Nectarophora lycopersici Clarke; Nectarophora tabaci Pergande; Siphonophora asclepiadifolii Thomas; Siphonophora cucurbitae Middleton ex Thomas; Siphonophora euphorbiae Thomas; Siphonophora solanifolii Ashmead; Siphonophora tulipae Mondell

= Macrosiphum euphorbiae =

Species of true bug

Macrosiphum euphorbiae, the potato aphid, is a sap-sucking pest insect in the family Aphididae. It infests potatoes and a number of other commercially important crops.

== Distribution ==
Macrosiphum euphorbiae originated in North America but it has spread to the temperate parts of Europe and Asia and is found in all areas in which potatoes are grown.

== Description ==
The wingless female potato aphid is green or occasionally pink, often with a darker dorsal stripe. It has a pear-shaped body reaching about four millimetres long. The antennae are dark at the joints between the segments and are longer than the body. They are set on outward facing tubercles. The legs are longer than in other aphids, pale green but darker at the apices. The siphunculi are pale coloured, cylindrical with dark tips and operculi, and are about one third the length of the body. The tail is sword-shaped and bears 6 to 12 hairs and is much shorter than the siphunculi. The winged female has a uniform darker coloured body and appendages and has a green abdomen. The nymphs are like miniature versions of the adults and go through several moults in the course of about ten days.

The green biotype is most often found on the lower, older leaves of potato plants whereas the pink biotype had no such preference. The numerical predominance of the green biotype was greater on older plants.

== Biology ==
Female potato aphids overwinter as eggs on weeds, the sprouts of potatoes in storage and on lettuce under glass. They usually emerge in April and begin feeding on perennial weeds, preferring plants in the family Chenopodiaceae. In May or early June, they migrate to potato, cabbage, tomato and others crops where they feed on shoots, the lower side of leaves, buds and flowers, often on the lower parts of the plant. They are highly polyphagous, feeding on over two hundred species in more than twenty plant families, but their preference is for plants in the family Solanaceae. The female produces up to seventy young by parthenogenesis over the course of three to six weeks and there may be ten generations over the summer. The optimum temperature for population increase is 68 °F. When populations build up, winged individuals are produced and fly off to infest new host plants. The production of winged individuals is also dependent on the day length, the temperature, the parent type (winged or wingless) and the generation.

The aphids migrate back to primary hosts in August and overwinter as eggs on weeds. In North America they are heavily parasitized by the braconid wasp Aphidius nigripes, which lays its eggs in the aphid nymphs, and these are eventually killed by the wasp larvae developing inside them.

== Management ==
Various factors influence aphid populations. High temperatures or heavy rainfall may reduce infestations and the numbers are naturally controlled by predators, parasites and pathogens. Some plant varieties are more resistant to attack than others. In a study on tomatoes, it was shown that the aphids preferred smooth to hairy leaves and that susceptible tomato plants had higher sucrose, lower quinic acid and higher alanine and tyrosine levels. In lettuce, butterhead varieties are mostly moderately to highly resistant to the aphid whereas crisphead varieties are susceptible. If numbers of aphids are sufficiently high, chemical control can be attempted using insecticidal soaps. This is not always effective because the aphids usually congregate on the underside of lower leaves where they are difficult to reach with sprays.

== Disease spread ==
A number of virus diseases are spread by Macrosiphum euphorbiae. These include lettuce mosaic virus, bearded iris mosaic virus, narcissus yellow stripe virus, tulip breaking virus, potato leaf roll virus, potato virus Y, beet mild yellowing virus and beet yellows virus.
