= Cinara confinis =

Scientific classification
- Domain: Eukaryota
- Kingdom: Animalia
- Phylum: Arthropoda
- Class: Insecta
- Order: Hemiptera
- Suborder: Sternorrhyncha
- Family: Aphididae
- Genus: Cinara
- Species: C. confinis

Binomial name
- Cinara confinis (Koch, 1856)

Synonyms
- Cinara ciliciea Ghosh, A.K., 1982; Todolachnus abieticola bulgarica Pintera, 1959; Cinara lasiocarpae (Gillette & Palmer, 1930); Lachnus lasiocarpae Gillette & Palmer, 1930; Cinara vanduzei (Swain, 1919); Panimerus vanduzei (Swain, 1919); Lachnus vanduzei Swain, 1919; Lachniella cilicica Del Guercio, 1909; Panimerus cilicica (Del Guercio, 1909); Lachniella cilicica ceccionii Del Guercio, 1909; Todolachnus abieticola (Cholodkovsky, 1899); Cinara abieticola (Cholodkovsky, 1899); Lachnus abieticola Cholodkovsky, 1899; Todolachnus confinis (Koch, 1856); Lachnus confinis Koch, 1856; Cinara borealis

Species of true bug

Cinara confinis, the black stem aphid, is a species of aphid in the genus Cinara, found feeding on the twigs of various species of fir (Abies) and on several other species of coniferous trees. This aphid has a Holarctic distribution and is known from Europe, Asia, North America and Argentina.

== Description ==
Cinara confinis is a dark-coloured aphid growing to a maximum length of about 8 mm (0.3 in). The head and thorax are dark brown with yellowish-grey antennae and dark brown-ringed or blackish limbs. The abdomen is greenish-black or dark brown with two longitudinal rows of shining black spots and specks of wax in transverse rows. The cornicles (upright tubes found on the last abdominal segment) are prominent and dark-coloured.

== Hosts ==
Cinara confinis has been found feeding on species of fir (Abies), and also on cedar (Cedrus), spruce (Picea) and juniper (Juniperus). It has a Holarctic distribution and is found in temperate regions of Europe and Asia, in North America and Argentina. Fir trees were introduced into the United Kingdom in the 17th century, and C. confinis may have been introduced at the same time.

== Biology ==
In Maine, wingless females known as fundatrices hatch out of over-wintering eggs in mid-May, at the base of buds near the top of small trees. Colonies form just below the first whorl of shoots and the reproduction at first is parthenogenetic and viviparous with the offspring being wingless. If disturbed, adults drop to the ground but nymphs move rapidly away on the trunk. Colonies are transitory, and by mid-June, most colonies are at the base of trees, at the root collar or on the roots. Some winged females then occur and colonies develop on the roots and root collars of nearby trees. By October, winged males are also produced, and they and winged females move to near the top of the trees where eggs are laid in crevices in the bark.

Colonies of this aphid are often attended by ants such as the southern wood ant (Formica rufa) which feed on the honeydew produced by the aphids. Sometimes the ants construct earth galleries to enclose the aphid colony. The ants also protect the aphids from parasitic wasps; however, some aphids are still parasitized, and become blackish, mummified husks. The wasp Pauesia grossa, found in Central Europe, is probably restricted to using Cinara confinis as a host in which to lay eggs.
