= Josef Fahringer =

Austrian entomologist (1876–1950)

Josef Fahringer (21 December 1876 – 18 December 1950) was an Austrian entomologist.

Fahringer was born in Baden bei Wien. He obtained a doctorate at the University of Vienna in 1904 and taught at a middle school in Vienna from 1904 to 1907. He then taught at Brüx from 1907 to 1910, and at Brno from 1910 to 1913.

Following military service as a captain during the First World War, he returned as a schoolteacher to Vienna, where in 1928 he was named director of the school. During his career, he took research trips to Bosnia-Herzegovina, Dalmatia, Italy and Turkey.

He published the first modern monograph on Braconidae: Opuscula braconolocica (4 parts, 1925–37). A specialist of this group, he also made contributions regarding the systematics of other parasitic Hymenoptera.
