= Carl Muesebeck =

American entomologist

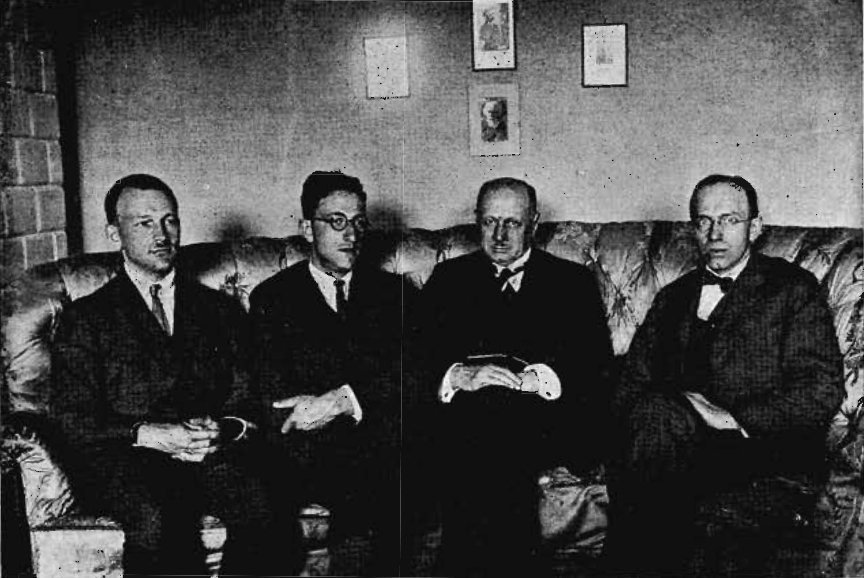
Muesebeck, right-most in Poland, 1927

Carl Frederick William Muesebeck (24 September 1894 - 13 November 1987) was an American entomologist who specialized in the Hymenoptera. He worked at the insect identification division of the US Department of Agriculture and was also a research associate at the Smithsonian Institution.

Muesebeck was born in Medina, New York where his parents William and Marie Koch had moved to in the 1880s. His father who worked as a tailor came from Stettin, Pomerania (the family name has variants that include Meusebach) and his mother was from Angermunde, east of Berlin. They had married in the United States. Muesebeck went to school in Medina and at Brockport High School, while also helping his father at his tailoring business. He joined Cornell University in 1912 and took an interest in mathematics and English. His interest in insects was sparked by studies under John Henry Comstock and Anna Botsford Comstock. Graduating with an interest in biology and entomology he joined the US department of agriculture in 1916 studying gypsy and brown-tail moths in his early years. He resigned work in 1918 to join Cornell for doctoral studies. His thesis was on the North American Apanteles and after receiving his doctorate, he rejoined the USDA in 1919. He worked briefly in Hungary in 1926-1928 during which time he travelled around Europe. Muesebeck wrote numerous taxonomic revisions on hymenoptera. Another influential work was his catalogue of Common names of insects approved by the American association of economic entomologists (1946).

For his 75th birthday the flea specialist Robert Traub named a genus Muesebeckella after him while Harry Hoogstraal described a tick Ornithodoros (Alectorobius) muesebecki from an masked booby to which he gave the common name "Muesebeck's Arabian Booby Argasid." Karl Krombein dedicated a genus of cuckoo wasp Muesebeckidium.

Muesebeck retired in 1954. He took part in baseball and bowling, and was a long-distance runner. He married Ida C. Praedel in 1917. They had a son who died at the age of 16 from a brain tumour in 1935. Ida died in 1975. He married Luella M. Walkley, a hymenopterist colleague, in 1980 but she died in 1981. He then lived with his cousin Elfrieda Geissler.
