= Piskurozymaceae =

Scientific classification
- Kingdom: Fungi
- Division: Basidiomycota
- Class: Tremellomycetes
- Order: Filobasidiales
- Family: Piskurozymaceae; X.Z. Liu, F.Y. Bai, M. Groenew. & Boekhout (2015)

Genera
- Piskurozyma; Solicoccozyma

Genus of fungi

The Piskurozymaceae are a family of fungi in the order Filobasidiales. Most species are only known from their yeast states, but some produce filamentous sexual states with basidia that are parasitic on other fungi. The family currently contains two genera.

The genus name of Piskurozyma is in honour of Jure Piškur (1960-2014), who was a Slovenian molecular geneticist from the University of Copenhagen.
