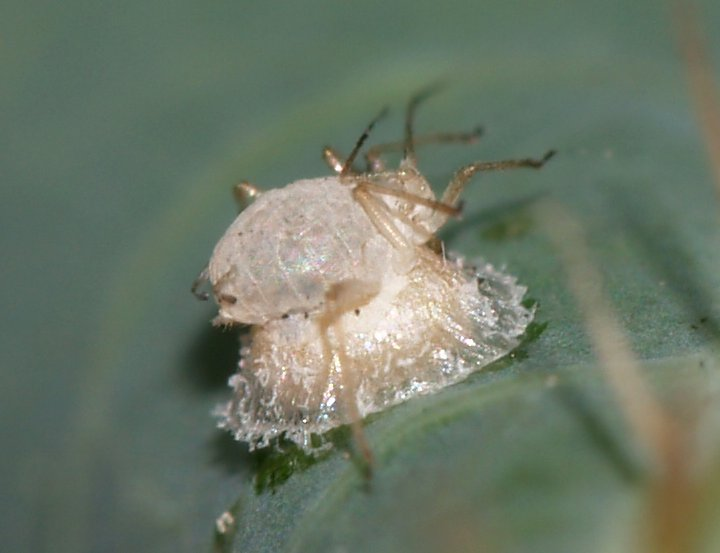
- Praon cocoon below hollowed aphid

Scientific classification
- Kingdom: Animalia
- Phylum: Arthropoda
- Clade: Pancrustacea
- Class: Insecta
- Order: Hymenoptera
- Family: Braconidae
- Subfamily: Aphidiinae; Haliday, 1833

Diversity
- c. 50 genera, 400 species

= Aphidiinae =

Subfamily of wasps

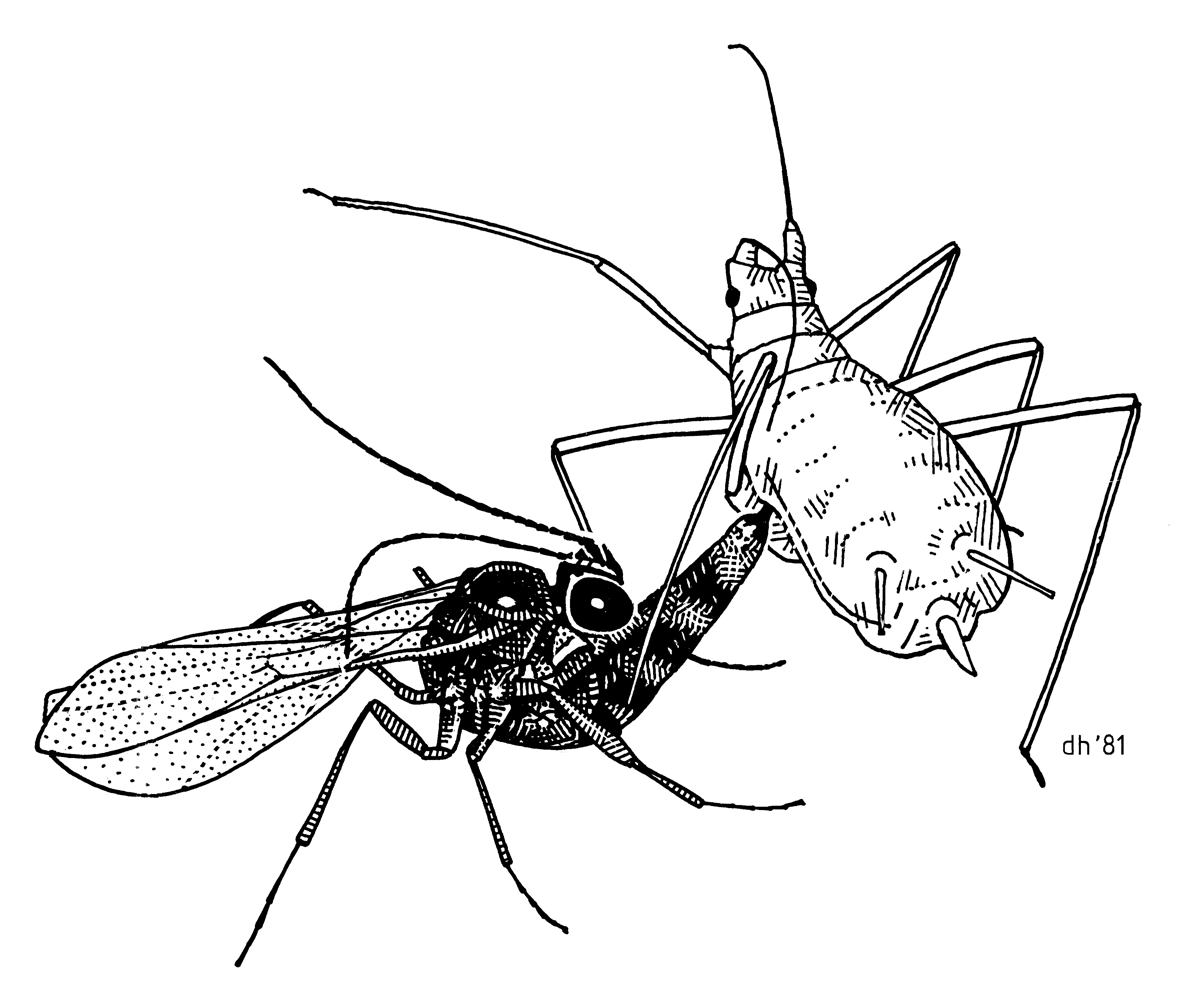
Aphidius attacking pea aphid

The Aphidiinae are a subfamily of tiny parasitoid wasps that use aphids as their hosts and are commonly known as aphid mummy wasps. Several species have been used in biological control programs of various aphids.

== Biology and distribution ==
Aphidiines are koinobiont endoparasitoids of adult and immature aphids. While the larva of the 2–3 mm long Praon leaves the hollowed shell of the aphid from below to pupate in a volcano-like cocoon, most other Aphidiinae pupate inside the dead aphid and break out afterwards.

These wasps are found worldwide, but are primarily found in the northern hemisphere. Several species have been introduced to countries outside of their natural range, both accidentally and purposefully for biocontrol.

== Systematics ==
Although they have often been treated as a separate family, the Aphidiidae, the Aphidiinae are a lineage within the Braconidae. It is not yet clear to which braconid subfamilies they are most closely related.

- Ephedrini
- - Praini
  - Aphidiini
    - Monoctonina
    - Trioxina
    - Aphidiina

Aphidiinae relationships
(after Shi & Chen 2005)

The Aphidiinae are subdivided into several tribes, the Ephedrini, Praini, Trioxini, Aclitini, and Aphidiini, with the latter subdivided into three subtribes. Most species reside in the Aphidiini. The Praini's loss of internal pupation is likely to be secondary.

There are ~400 spp. in ~50 genera worldwide.

== Genera ==
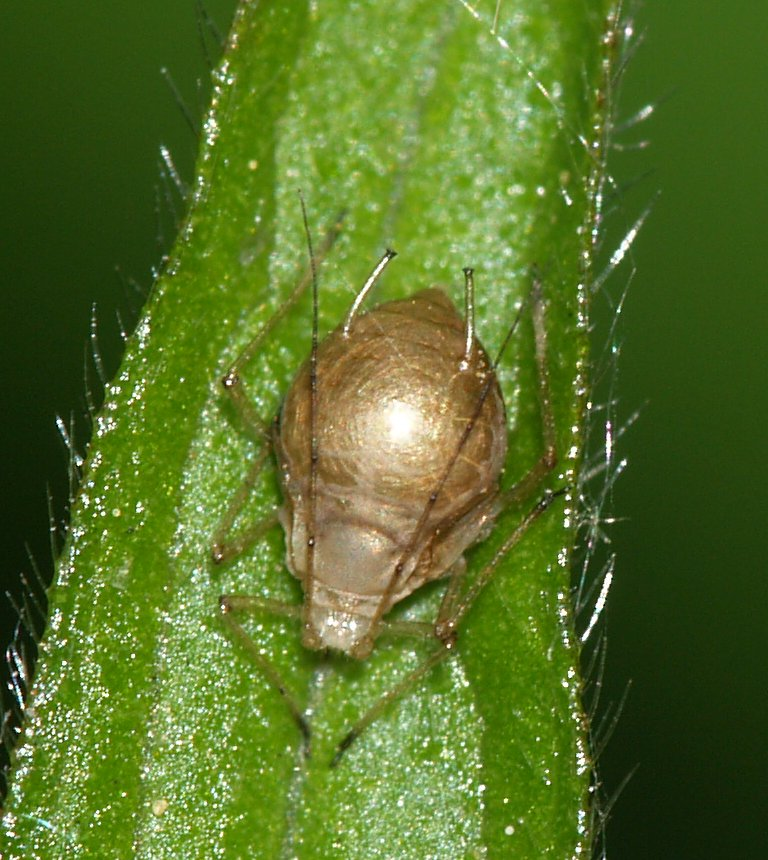
parasitized aphid, still closed

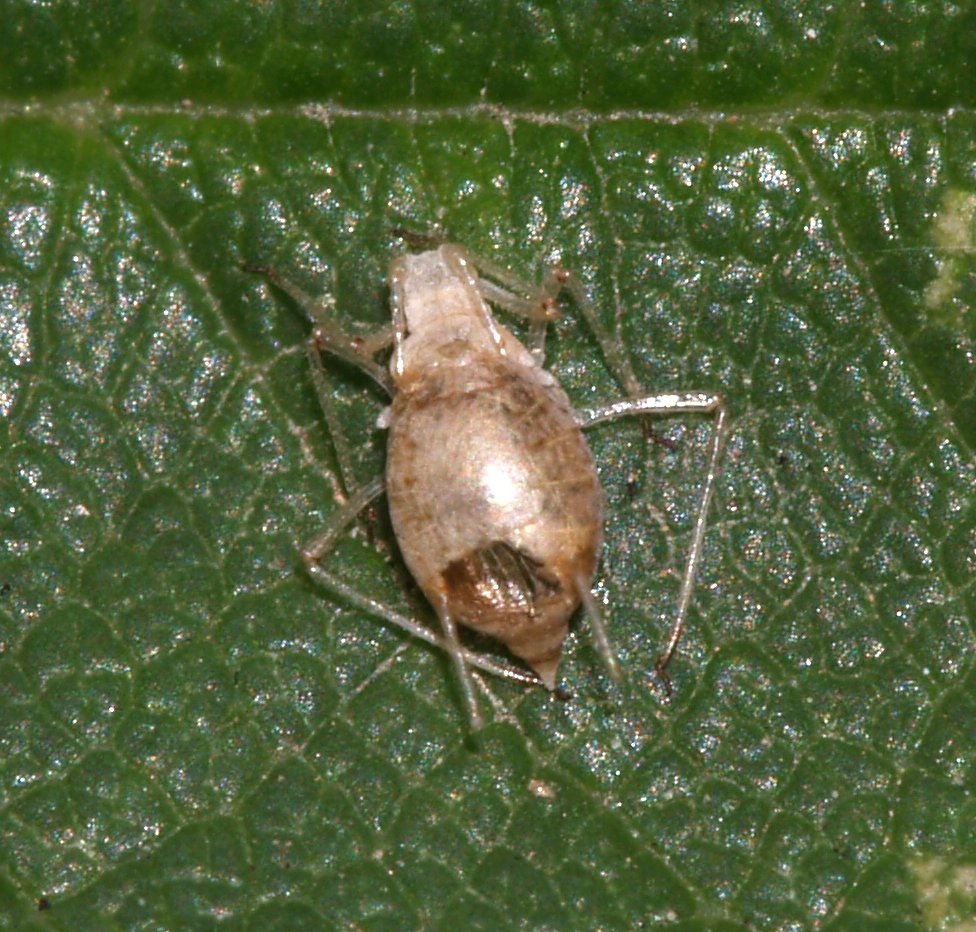
parasitized aphid with exit hole

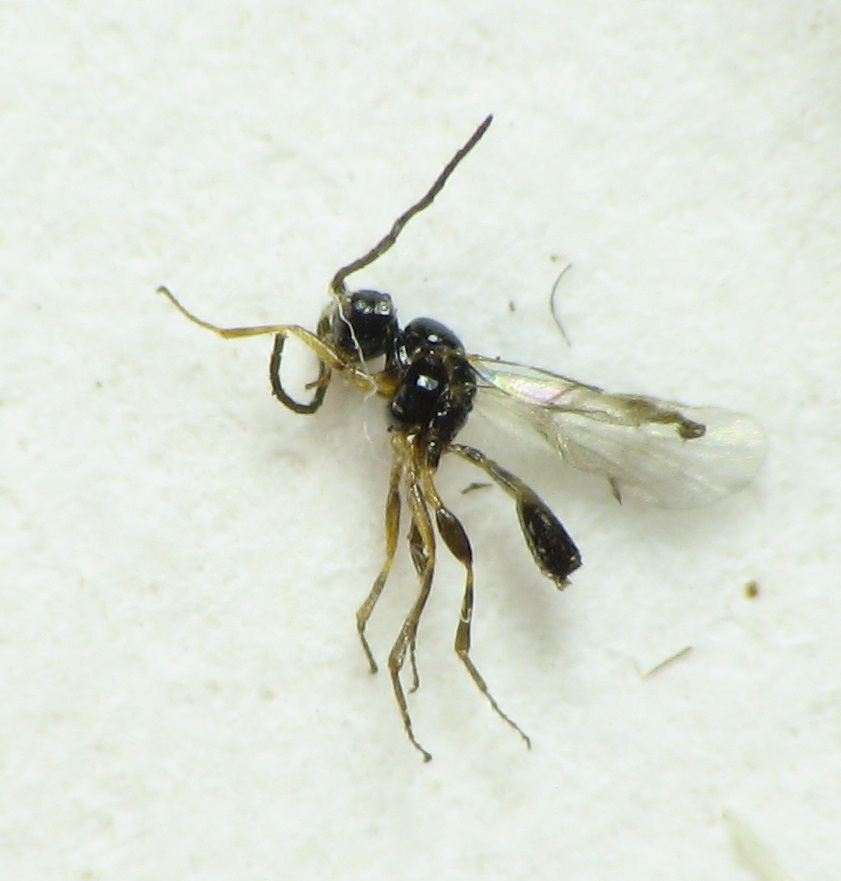
Lysiphlebus sp.

Ephedrini

- Ephedrus
- Indoephedrus
- Neoephedrus
- Toxares

Praini

- Praon
- Dyscritulus
- Harkeria
- Areopraon

Trioxini

- Trioxys
- Binodoxys
- Monoctonus
- Monoctonia
- Lipolexis
- Parabioxys
- Bioxys

Aclitini

- Aclitus

Aphidiini

- Aphidius
- Calaphidius
- Diaeretiella
- Diaeretus
- Diaeretellus
- Lysaphidus
- Lysiphlebia
- Paralipsis
- Pauesia
- Protaphidius
- Pseudopauesia
- Adialytus
- Lysiphlebus
- Xenostigmus

== See also ==
- Aphidius nigripes
