= Melezitose =

Names
- IUPAC name α-D-Glucopyranosyl α-D-glucopyranosyl-(1→3)-β-D-fructofuranoside
- Systematic IUPAC name (2R,2′R,3R,3′R,4S,4′S,5S,5′S,6R,6′R)-2,2′-{[(2S,3S,4R,5R)-4-Hydroxy-2,5-bis(hydroxymethyl)oxolane-2,3-diyl]bis(oxy)}bis[6-(hydroxymethyl)oxane-3,4,5-triol]
- Other names Melicitose

Identifiers
CAS Number	597-12-6
3D model (JSmol)	Interactive image
ChEBI	CHEBI:6731
ChEMBL	ChEMBL386007
ChemSpider	83787
ECHA InfoCard	100.008.997
PubChem CID	92817
UNII	T4T25QN29L
CompTox Dashboard (EPA)	DTXSID20883458
- InChI: InChI=1S/C18H32O16/c19-1-5-8(23)11(26)13(28)16(30-5)32-15-10(25)7(3-21)33-18(15,4-22)34-17-14(29)12(27)9(24)6(2-20)31-17/h5-17,19-29H,1-4H2/t5-,6-,7-,8-,9-,10-,11+,12+,13-,14-,15+,16-,17-,18+/m1/s1 Key: QWIZNVHXZXRPDR-WSCXOGSTSA-N; InChI=1/C18H32O16/c19-1-5-8(23)11(26)13(28)16(30-5)32-15-10(25)7(3-21)33-18(15,4-22)34-17-14(29)12(27)9(24)6(2-20)31-17/h5-17,19-29H,1-4H2/t5-,6-,7-,8-,9-,10-,11+,12+,13-,14-,15+,16-,17-,18+/m1/s1 Key: QWIZNVHXZXRPDR-WSCXOGSTBR
- SMILES: O1[C@H](CO)[C@@H](O)[C@H](O)[C@@H](O)[C@H]1O[C@@]3(O[C@@H]([C@@H](O)[C@@H]3O[C@H]2O[C@H](CO)[C@@H](O)[C@H](O)[C@H]2O)CO)CO

Properties
Chemical formula	C_{18}H_{32}O_{16}
Molar mass	504.438 g·mol^{−1}
- Except where otherwise noted, data are given for materials in their standard state (at 25 °C [77 °F], 100 kPa). verify (what is ?) Infobox references

Melezitose, also spelled melecitose and melicitose, is a trisaccharide sugar that occurs in the honeydew of many sap trees such as larch, lime tree, poplar, and Douglas fir, and also in honey. It is produced enzymatically by many plant sap eating lice, such as Cinara pilicornis. The name is by the French chemist Berthelot, who first isolated it from larch honeydew in 1856.

== Function ==
Melecitose can be hydrolyzed with acid to glucose and turanose, a sucrose isomer. It is beneficial to the insects, as it reduces the stress of osmosis by reducing their own water potential. Melecitose attracts ants and is also eaten by bees and incorporated into honey, although it is not easily digested by bees.

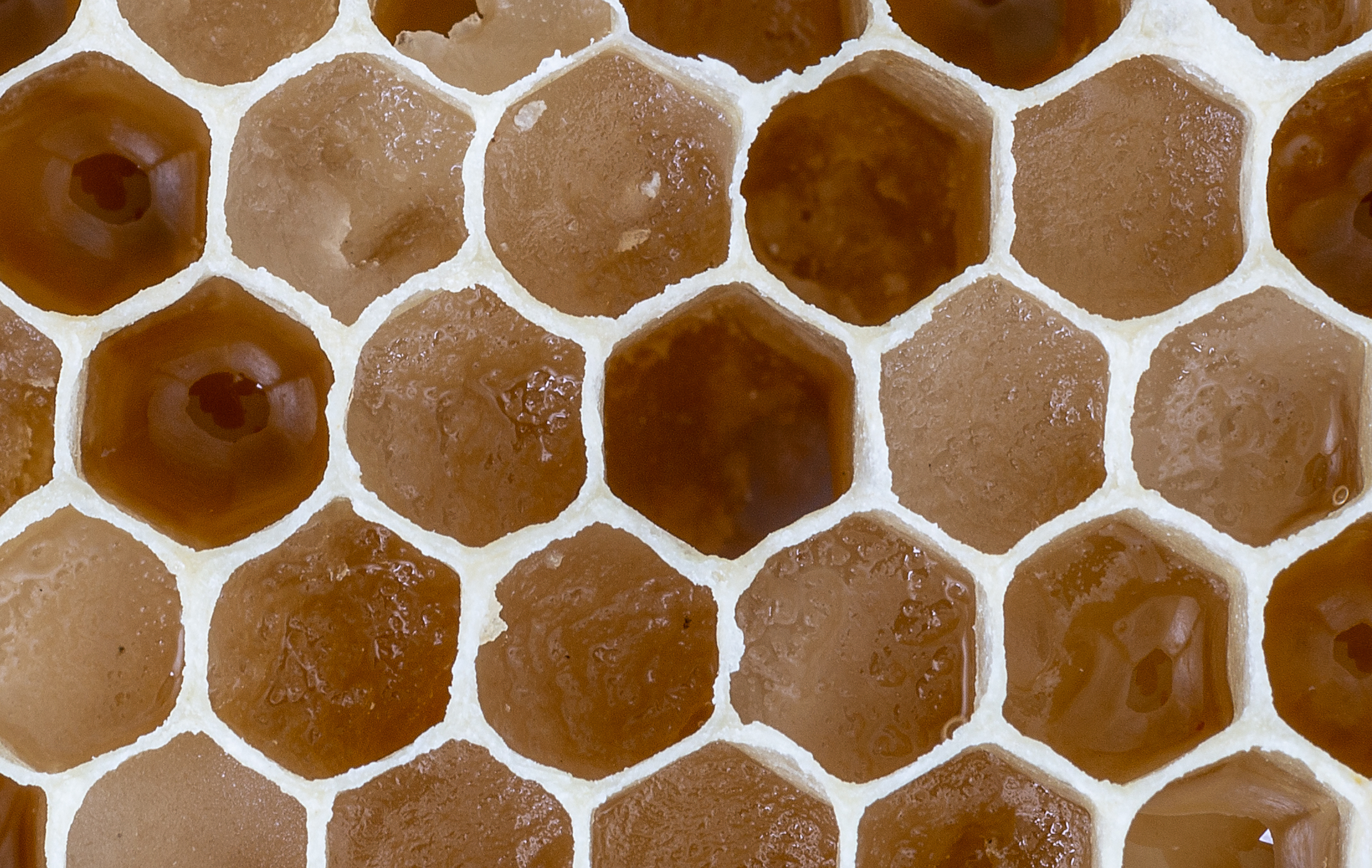
Honeycomb filled with melezitose

Honey with a high melecitose content (honeydew honey, "cement honey") crystallizes in the honeycomb and cannot be extracted with centrifuging, but must be dissolved in much water. It is therefore less suited as winter food for the bees and a nuisance to beekeepers.

== See also ==
- Honeydew (secretion)
- Honeydew honey
- Trisaccharide
- Oligosaccharide
- Aphid
