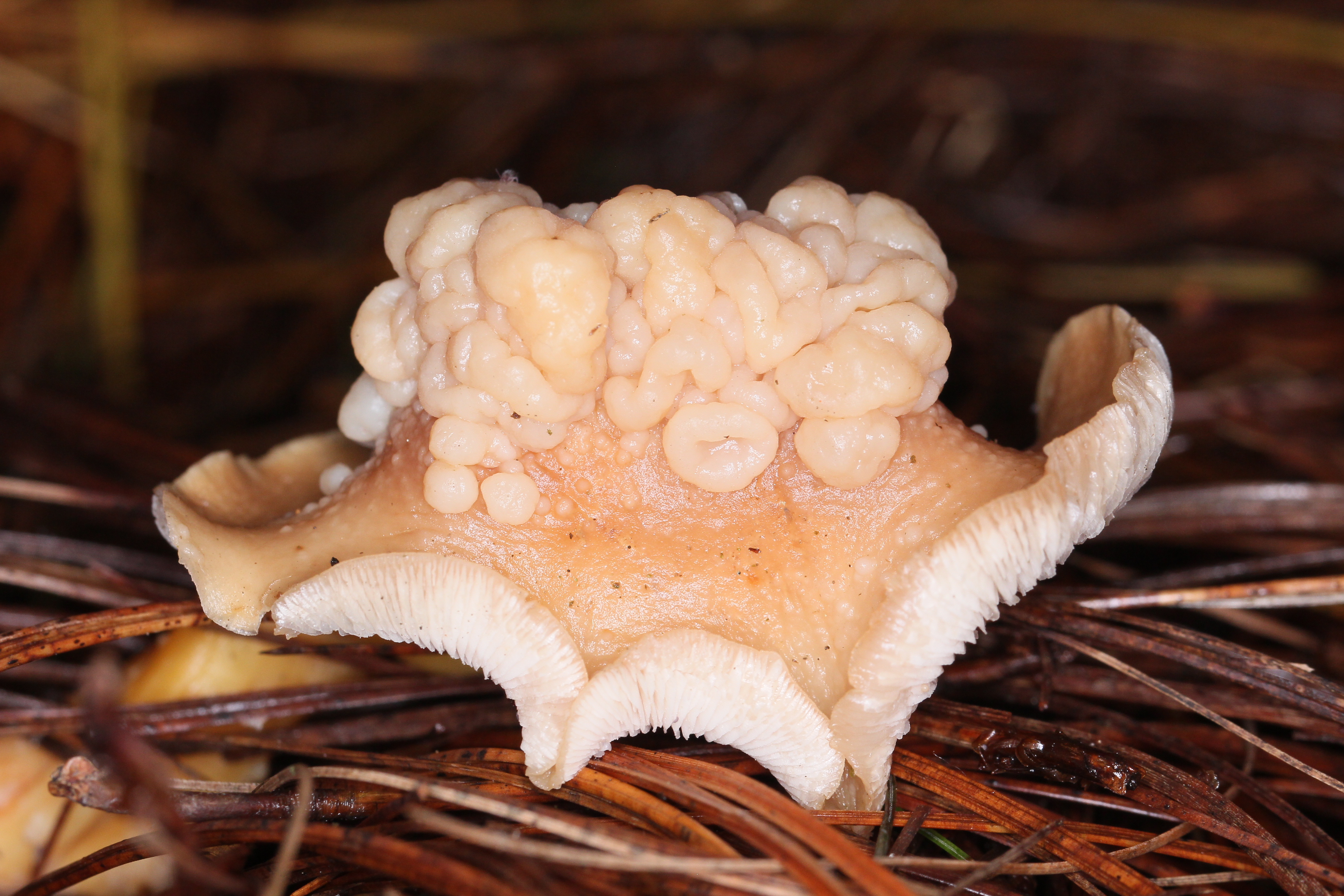
- Galls of Carcinomyces mycetophilus on the agaric Gymnopus dryophilus

Scientific classification
- Kingdom: Fungi
- Division: Basidiomycota
- Class: Tremellomycetes
- Order: Filobasidiales
- Family: Filobasidiaceae; L.S. Olive (1968)

Genera
- Filobasidium; Goffeauzyma; Naganishia; Syzygospora; Zyzygomyces

Synonyms
- Syzygosporaceae

= Filobasidiaceae =

Family of fungi

The Filobasidiaceae are a family of fungi in the order Filobasidiales. Most species are yeasts, but some form gelatinous fruit bodies that are parasitic on other fungi, including lichens. The family currently contains five genera.
