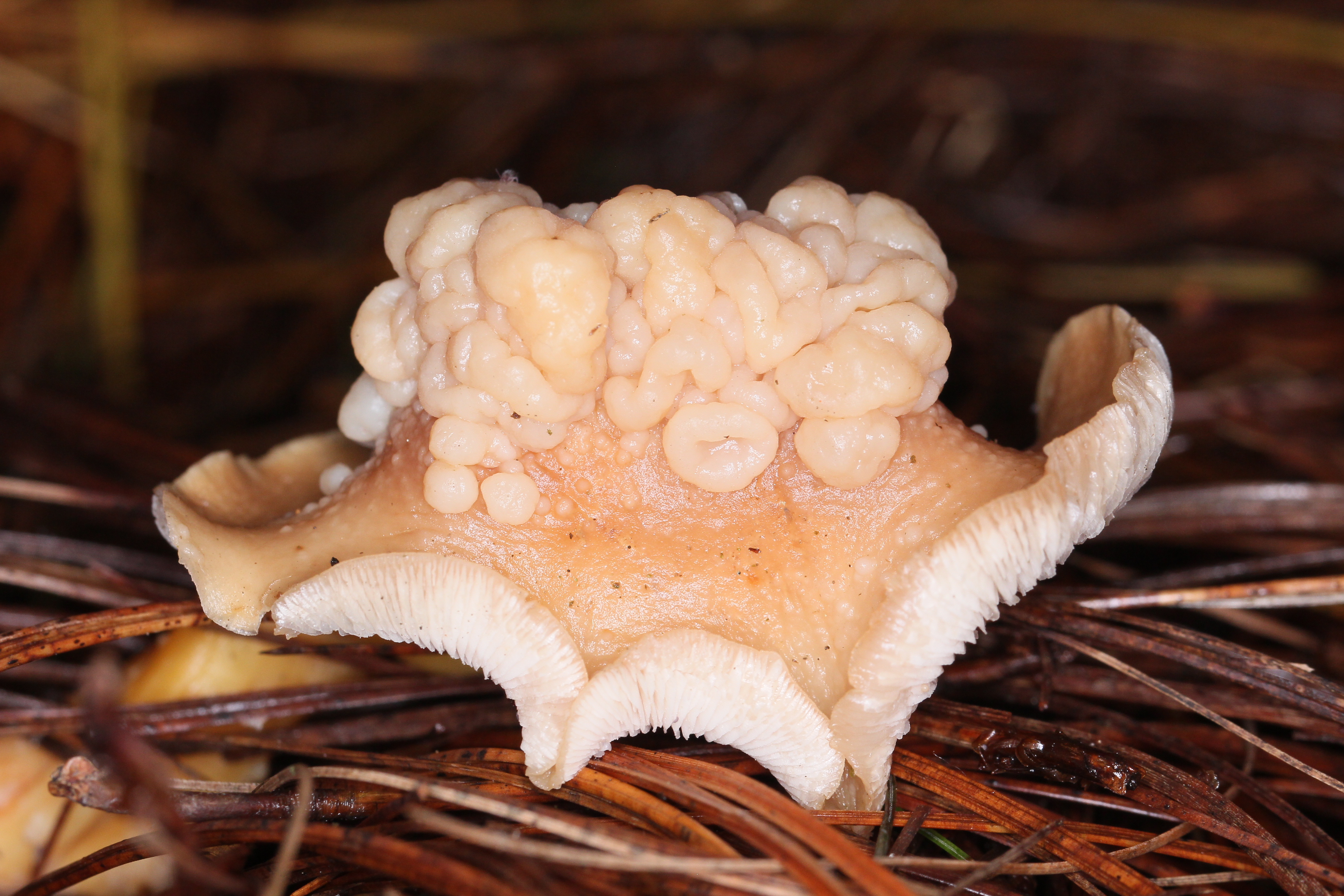
- Galls of Carcinomyces mycetophilus on the agaric Gymnopus dryophilus

Scientific classification
- Kingdom: Fungi
- Division: Basidiomycota
- Class: Tremellomycetes
- Order: Filobasidiales; Jülich (1981)

Families
- Filobasidiaceae; Piskurozymaceae

= Filobasidiales =

Order of fungi

The Filobasidiales are an order in the fungal class Tremellomycetes. The order contains two families and seven genera. Most of the species in the order are yeasts, though some form gelatinous fruit bodies that are parasitic on other fungi, including lichens.
