= Hanseniaspora osmophila =

Scientific classification
- Kingdom: Fungi
- Division: Ascomycota
- Class: Saccharomycetes
- Order: Saccharomycetales
- Family: Saccharomycodaceae
- Genus: Hanseniaspora
- Species: H. osmophila

Binomial name
- Hanseniaspora osmophila (Niehaus) Phaff et al. (1956)

Synonyms
- Pseudosaccharomyces corticis Klöcker 1912; Kloeckera corticis (Klöcker) Janke 1928; Hanseniaspora antillarum (Klöcker) Kudryavtsev 1954; Pseudosaccharomyces magnus de Rossi 1920; Kloeckera magna (de Rossi) Janke 1928; Pseudosaccharomyces santacruzensis Klöcker 1912; Kloeckera santacruzensis (Klöcker) Janke 1928; Kloeckeraspora osmophila Niehaus 1932

Species of yeast

Hanseniaspora osmophila is a species of yeast in the family Saccharomycetaceae. It is found in soil and among the bark, leaves, and fruits of plants, as well as fermented foods and beverages made from fruit.

== Taxonomy ==
Albert Klöcker originally published descriptions of two yeasts in the anamorphic form in 1912; Pseudosaccharomyces corticis, which he isolated on various trees around Copenhagen, and Pseudosaccharomyces santacruzensis, which he obtained from soil in Saint Croix. In 1920, Giuseppe de Rossi isolated a species of yeast from grapes and grape must in Umbria, Italy. He placed it in the same genus, assigning the name Pseudosaccharomyces magnus. Because the Pseudosaccharomyces name had already been used since 1906 for an unrelated organism, in 1923, Alexander Janke proposed an alternative name, Klöckeria, for the genus, which he corrected in 1928 to Kloeckera.

Independently, in 1932, C. J. G. Niehaus described two species of yeasts that possessed spherical ascospores in their holomorphic state. This spherical shape was different from Klöcker's description of the ascospores of the Hanseniaspora genus. Niehaus created a new genus, Kloeckeraspora, which was similar to Hanseniaspora except for the shape of the ascospores. He called one of the new species Kloeckeraspora osmophila, and the other was Kloeckeraspora uvarum. The creation of the new genus was controversial among researchers who disagreed that the number and shape of ascospores was enough of a defining characteristic for a new genus, and in 1948, Emil M. Mrak and Herman Phaff proposed that a slight modification of the Hanseniaspora genus would allow the combination of the two genera. In their study of samples of the species, Jacomina Lodder and N.J.W. Kreger-Van Rij could not find any ascospores in Kloeckeraspora osmophila, so they provisionally reclassified it as Kloeckera magna in 1952, but Shehata, et al. were able to produce abundantly sporulating strains in their laboratory, and preferred to include the yeast in the Hanseniaspora genus, reclassifying both of the species identified by Niehaus as synonyms of H. uvarum in 1955. The next year, H.J. Phaff, M.W. Miller, and M. Shifrine determined that the strains were different species, since K. osmophila had the ability to assimilate maltose, but H. uvarum could not, and therefore proposed that the strains originally defined as Kloeckeraspora osmophila be named Hanseniaspora osmophila.

In 1958, Miller and Phaff studied yeast species of the Hanseniaspora and Kloeckera genera and concluded that Kloeckera magna and Kloeckera corticis were the same species, with K. corticis taking name priority, and determined that it was the anamorphic form of Hanseniaspora osmophila. DNA Testing by S.A. Meyer in 1978 conclusively synonymized the anamorphic yeasts in the Kloeckera genus with their teleomorphic counterparts in the Hanseniaspora genus, and recategorized Kloeckera corticis as a synonym of Hanseniaspora osmophila. The testing also determined that Kloeckera santacruzensis was the same species as Hanseniaspora osmophila.

== Description ==
Microscopic examination of the yeast cells in YM liquid medium after 48 hours at 25°C reveals cells that are 3.5 to 6 μm by 7.2 to 18.2 μm in size, apiculate, ovoid or long-ovoid, appearing singly or in pairs. Reproduction is by budding, which occurs at both poles of the cell. In broth culture, sediment is present, and after one month a thin ring is formed.

Colonies that are grown on malt agar for one month at 25°C appear white to cream-colored, glossy, and smooth. Growth is flat on the edges and raised at the center. The yeast forms branched pseudohyphae on potato agar. The yeast has been observed to form one or two sherical and warty ascospores when grown for at least one week on 5% Difco malt extract agar, and the ascospores are not released from the ascus.

The yeast can ferment glucose, but not sucrose, galactose, maltose, lactose, raffinose or trehalose. The yeast can assimilate glucose, cellobiose, and salicin. Assimilation of sucrose and maltose is variable. It has a positive growth rate at 30°C, but no growth at 34°C. It can not grow on agar media containing 0.1% cycloheximide and can not utilize 2-keto-d-gluconate as a sole source of carbon.

== Ecology ==
The species has been identified from locations worldwide, mainly on the bark, flowers, or fruit of plants, or in soil. It has also been found in fermented foods and beverages made from fruit, including wine and vinegar.

Apart from unwanted spoilage, this yeast is also present in the fermentation of traditional Italian balsamic vinegar (Zygosaccharomyces rouxii together with Zygosaccharomyces bailii, Z. pseudorouxii, Z. mellis, Z. bisporus, Z. lentus, Hanseniaspora valbyensis, Hanseniaspora osmophila, Candida lactis-condensi, Candida stellata, Saccharomycodes ludwigii, Saccharomyces cerevisiae)

== Effects on wine production ==
A study of the fermentation characteristics of H. osmophila in wine must found that it shares many of the characteristics of Saccharomyces ludwigii, a spoilage yeast that has been referred to as the "winemaker's nightmare" due to its ability to outcompete targeted fermentation yeasts. In the study, H. osmophila preferentially fermented glucose, followed by fructose, and was able to tolerate an alcohol level of up to 11.2% at 15°C. Due to the production of acetic acid, acetaldehyde, ethyl acetate, and acetoin to concentrations above the taste threshold and the lack of inhibition of growth and fermentation rate with the use of sulfur dioxide, the study concluded that the presence of H. osmophila should be considered detrimental to wine production.
