= Hanseniaspora lachancei =

Scientific classification
- Kingdom: Fungi
- Division: Ascomycota
- Class: Saccharomycetes
- Order: Saccharomycetales
- Family: Saccharomycodaceae
- Genus: Hanseniaspora
- Species: H. lachancei

Binomial name
- Hanseniaspora lachancei Čadež, Poot, Raspor & M.Th. Smith 2003

Species of yeast

Hanseniaspora lachancei is a species of yeast in the family Saccharomycetaceae. It is associated with fermenting agave juice and a tequila production facility in Mexico.

== Taxonomy ==
Samples of H. lachancei were first isolated from samples taken at the Tequila Herradura estate in Jalisco, Mexico over a seven-day period in February 1992. Initially mis-identified as atypical Hanseniaspora guilliermondii strains, further testing revealed that the samples were distinct from H. guilliermondii. The species was first described by Neža Čadež, Gé A. Poot, Peter Raspor, and Maudy Th. Smith in 2003 and given the specific epithet "lachancei" after Marc-André Lachance, the yeast taxonomist and ecologist who collected the original samples.

Genetic sequencing shows that the species is closely related to Hanseniaspora opuntiae, Hanseniaspora pseudoguilliermondii, and Hanseniaspora guilliermondii.

== Description ==
Microscopic examination of the yeast cells in YM liquid medium after 48 hours at 25 °C reveals cells that are 2.5 to 18.5 μm by 1.0 to 5.5 μm in size, apiculate, ovoid to elongate, appearing singly or in pairs. Reproduction is by budding, which occurs at both poles of the cell. In broth culture, sediment is present, and after one month a very thin ring is formed.

Colonies that are grown on malt agar for one month at 25 °C appear cream-colored, butyrous, glossy, and smooth. Growth is flat to slightly raised at the center, with an entire to slightly undulating margin. The yeast forms poorly-developed pseudohyphae on cornmeal or potato agar. The yeast has been observed to form four hat-shaped ascospores when grown for at least seven days on 5% Difco malt extract agar.

The yeast can ferment glucose and cellobiose, but not galactose, sucrose, maltose, lactose, raffinose or trehalose. It has a positive growth rate at 37 °C, which is a distinguishing characteristic from other species of Hanseniaspora, but there is no growth at 40 °C. It can grow on agar media containing 0.1% cycloheximide and 10% sodium but growth on 50% glucose-yeast extract agar is weak.

== Ecology ==
Three strains of the species have been isolated from fermenting agave juice in Mexico as well as from Drosophila species captured inside a tequila facility. It is not known whether it has any human pathogenic potential, but it can grow at a normal body temperature.
