= Hanseniaspora meyeri =

Scientific classification
- Domain: Eukaryota
- Kingdom: Fungi
- Division: Ascomycota
- Class: Saccharomycetes
- Order: Saccharomycetales
- Family: Saccharomycodaceae
- Genus: Hanseniaspora
- Species: H. meyeri

Binomial name
- Hanseniaspora meyeri Čadež, Poot, Raspor & M.Th. Smith 2003

Species of yeast

Hanseniaspora meyeri is a species of yeast in the family Saccharomycetaceae. Samples of the species have been obtained worldwide from flowers, fruit flies, stem rot, and spoiled grape punch.

== Taxonomy ==
The first isolated sample of this species was isolated from the fruit of a soapberry plant in Hawaii. The specific epithet "meyeri" was named in honor of Piet Meyer, a young South African scientist.

Genetic sequencing shows that the species is very closely related to Hanseniaspora clermontiae.

== Description ==
Microscopic examination of the yeast cells in YM liquid medium after 48 hours at 25 °C reveals cells that are 2.5 to 12.5 μm by 1.5 to 6.0 μm in size, apiculate, ovoid to elongate, appearing singly or in pairs. Reproduction is by budding, which occurs at both poles of the cell. In broth culture, sediment is present, and after one month a very thin ring is formed.

Colonies that are grown on malt agar for one month at 25 °C appear cream-colored, butyrous, glossy, and smooth. Growth is flat to slightly raised at the center, with an entire to slightly undulating margin. The yeast forms poorly-developed pseudohyphae on cornmeal or potato agar. The yeast has been observed to form two to four hat-shaped ascospores when grown for at least two weeks on 5% Difco malt extract agar.

The yeast can ferment glucose and cellobiose, but not galactose, sucrose, maltose, lactose, raffinose or trehalose. It has a positive growth rate at 30 °C, but no growth at 35 °C. It can grow on agar media containing 0.1% cycloheximide and 10% sodium but growth on 50% glucose-yeast extract agar is weak. It can grow on media with 2-Keto-d-gluconate as a sole carbon source.

== Ecology ==
In addition to the fruit of the Sapindus plant in Hawaii where the initial sample was located, it has also been isolated from spoiled grape punch in Georgia, USA, from the flowers of the Schotia tree in South Africa, from stem rot in Clermontia species and from fruit flies on Sapindus berries in Hawaii. It is not known whether it has any human pathogenic potential, but it can not grow at a normal body temperature.
