= Hanseniaspora opuntiae =

Scientific classification
- Domain: Eukaryota
- Kingdom: Fungi
- Division: Ascomycota
- Class: Saccharomycetes
- Order: Saccharomycetales
- Family: Saccharomycodaceae
- Genus: Hanseniaspora
- Species: H. opuntiae

Binomial name
- Hanseniaspora opuntiae Čadež, Poot, Raspor & M.Th. Smith 2003

Species of yeast

Hanseniaspora opuntiae is a species of yeast in the family Saccharomycetaceae. It has been isolated from locations worldwide, on grape berries and on prickly pear cacti.

== Taxonomy ==
Samples of H. opuntiae were first isolated from samples taken from prickly pear cacti in Hawaii. The species was first described by Neža Čadež, Gé A. Poot, Peter Raspor, and Maudy Th. Smith in 2003 and given the specific epithet refers to the genus of the host plant where it was first isolated.

Genetic sequencing shows that the species is closely related to Hanseniaspora lachancei, Hanseniaspora pseudoguilliermondii, and Hanseniaspora guilliermondii. The four species can only be differentiated from those species by using PCR fingerprinting and not by conventional physiological criteria.

== Description ==
Microscopic examination of the yeast cells in YM liquid medium after 48 hours at 25 °C reveals cells that are 3.0 to 16.0 μm by 1.5 to 5.0 μm in size, apiculate, ovoid to elongate, appearing singly or in pairs. Reproduction is by budding, which occurs at both poles of the cell. In broth culture, sediment is present, and after one month a very thin ring and a sediment is formed.

Colonies that are grown on malt agar for one month at 25 °C appear cream-colored, butyrous, glossy, and smooth. Growth is flat to slightly raised at the center, with an entire to slightly undulating margin. The yeast forms poorly developed pseudohyphae on cornmeal or potato agar. The yeast has been observed to form four hat-shaped ascospores when grown for at least seven days on 5% Difco malt extract agar.

The yeast can ferment glucose and cellobiose, but not galactose, sucrose, maltose, lactose, raffinose or trehalose. It has a positive growth rate at 37 °C, but there is no growth at 40 °C. It can grow on agar media containing 0.1% cycloheximide and 10% sodium but growth on 50% glucose-yeast extract agar is weak. It has been shown to thrive during the early stages of fermentation of alcoholic beverages, but has a relatively low alcohol tolerance and activity decreases as alcohol levels increase.

== Ecology ==
Strains of the species have been isolated from rot occurring on prickly pear plants in Hawaii as well as on grape berries and wine in Australia, Greece, and China. A 2010 study found that H. opuntiae was the prevalent species involved with the post-harvest fermentation of cocoa beans on a plantation in Malaysia.

It is not known whether it has any human pathogenic potential, but it can grow at a normal body temperature.

== Effects on wine production ==
A study on the effects of co-fermentation of wine with H. opuntiae and commercial wine yeast found that H. opuntiae increased the output of certain fusel alcohols which improved the aroma qualities of the finished wine. It also reduced the production of fatty acids in the wine, which contribute negative effects on wine aromas when they are present above their sensory thresholds. Co-fermentation with H. opuntiae increased the production of phenylacetaldehyde, which lends a desirable floral and honey smell in wine. A different study examining the sequential fermentation of wine with H. opuntiae followed by commercial wine yeast after 7 days found an increase in the production of glycerol, ethyl acetate, several monoterpenes and a decrease in the production of decanoic acid, fatty acid esters, and final alcohol content. Blind sensory panels in the study compared two wines produced from the same must; the first fermented with a commercial wine yeast, and the second fermented with H. opuntiae for seven days followed by a sequential fermentation with the commercial wine yeast. Panelists used negative descriptors such as "alcohol", "overripe fruit", and "vegetable", along with positive descriptors "spicy" and "black fruits" to describe the wine fermented only with the commercial wine yeast. The sequentially fermented wine was associated with positive descriptors such as "coffee", "hazelnut", "caramel", and "cherry", along with negative descriptors of "acetone". The panelists were able to detect clear differences in the wines fermented with H. opuntiae compared to commercial wine yeast alone, with a general preference expressed for the mixed culture wines.
