= Hanseniaspora occidentalis =

Scientific classification
- Domain: Eukaryota
- Kingdom: Fungi
- Division: Ascomycota
- Class: Saccharomycetes
- Order: Saccharomycetales
- Family: Saccharomycodaceae
- Genus: Hanseniaspora
- Species: H. occidentalis

Binomial name
- Hanseniaspora occidentalis M. Th. Smith (1974)

Synonyms
- Pseudosaccharomyces antillarum Klöcker 1912; Kloeckera antillarum (Klöcker) Janke 1928; Hanseniaspora antillarum (Klöcker) Kudryavtsev 1954; Pseudosaccharomyces indicus Klöcker 1912; Kloeckera indica (Klöcker) Janke 1928; Pseudosaccharomyces javanicus Klöcker 1912; Kloeckera javanica (Klöcker) Janke 1928; Hanseniaspora javanica (Klöcker) Kudryavtsev 1954; Pseudosaccharomyces jensenii Klöcker 1912; Kloeckera jensenii (Klöcker) Janke 1928; Pseudosaccharomyces lafarii Klöcker 1912; Kloeckera lafarii (Klöcker) Janke 1928; Pseudosaccharomyces malaianus Klöcker 1912; Kloeckera malaiana (Klöcker) Janke 1928; Pseudosaccharomyces occidentalis Klöcker 1912; Kloeckera occidentalis (Klöcker) Janke 1928; Kloeckeraspora occidentalis (M.Th. Smith) Tamada, Maeda & Banno 1992; Pseudosaccharomyces willi Klöcker 1912; Kloeckera willi (Klöcker) Janke 1928; Kloeckeria cacaoicola Ciferri 1931

Species of yeast

Hanseniaspora occidentalis is a species of yeast in the family Saccharomycetaceae. In its anamorph form, it was called Kloeckera javanica. It has been isolated in the wild from soil samples and vineyards. Samples of a variant have been isolated from orange juice and rotten oranges. It has demonstrated potential as an organism to reduce malic acid in wine production.

== Taxonomy ==
The yeast was originally isolated by Albert Klöcker in the anamorphic form in 1912 and classified as Pseudosaccharomyces occidentalis. Because the Pseudosaccharomyces name had already been used since 1906 for an unrelated organism, Alexander Janke proposed an alternative name, Klöckeria, for the genus in 1923, which he corrected in 1928 to Kloeckera. Jacomina Lodder in 1934 found the yeast to be identical to another species, Kloeckera jensenii, also isolated by Klöcker in 1912, and reclassified it as a synonym of Kloeckera jensenii. A similar process occurred with yeasts identified by Klöcker as Pseudosaccharomyces indicus, Pseudosaccharomyces antillarum, and Pseudosaccharomyces willi, which Janke moved to Kloeckera indica, Kloeckera antillarum, and Kloeckera willi, and Lodder identified as three strains of the same species, consolidated into Kloeckera antillarum. Further study by Miller and Phaff in 1958 found that Kloeckera jensenii, Kloeckera javanica (originally Pseudosaccharomyces javanicus), Kloeckera lafarii, and Kloeckera antillarum were so similar to each other that they should be further combined into one species, Kloeckera javanica.

In 1974, yeast researcher Maudy Th. Smith observed a teleomorphic stage of the type strain of the original Kloeckera occidentalis yeast strain. As was custom at the time, teleomorphic forms of Kloeckera yeasts were identified as separate species in the Hanseniaspora genus, so it was designated as Hanseniaspora occidentalis. DNA Testing by S.A. Meyer in 1978 conclusively synonymized the anamorphic yeasts in the Kloeckera genus with their teleomorphic counterparts in the Hanseniaspora genus, and identified Kloeckera javanica as a synonym of Hanseniaspora occidentalis.

== Description ==
Microscopic examination of the yeast cells in YM liquid medium after 48 hours at 25°C reveals cells that are 1.8 to 6.2 μm by 3 to 11 μm in size, apiculate, ovoid or sometimes spherical, appearing singly or in pairs. Reproduction is by budding, which occurs at both poles of the cell. In broth culture, sediment is present, and after one month a thin ring is formed.

Colonies that are grown on malt agar for one month at 25°C appear white to cream-colored, glossy, and smooth. Growth is flat on the edges and slightly raised at the center. The yeast generally does not form pseudohyphae on potato agar, but some strains have been observed to form either poorly-developed or well-developed pseudohyphae. The yeast has been observed to form one or two sherical and smooth ascospores with an equatorial ledge when grown for at least one week on 5% Difco malt extract agar.

The yeast can ferment glucose and sucrose, but not galactose, maltose, lactose, raffinose or trehalose. The yeast can assimilate glucose, sucrose, cellobiose, and salicin. Assimilation of glycerol is variable. It has a positive growth rate at 30°C, but no growth at 37°C. It can not grow on agar media containing 0.1% cycloheximide and can not utilize 2-keto-d-gluconate as a sole source of carbon.

== Ecology ==
The type species of the original Pseudosaccharomyces occidentalis strain was isolated from a soil sample in Saint Croix, and other samples have been isolated from soil in Java and Saint Thomas. It has also been collected from Drosophila species in Brazil. Samples of a variant of the species, proposed as var. citrica, have been collected from orange juice in Italy and rotten oranges in Argentina. It is also commonly found in vineyards and the fruit flies that populate vineyards.

A 2022 study found that Muscaris wine must aerobically inoculated with Hanseniaspora occidentalis for three days followed by the addition of commercial wine yeast resulted in an almost complete elimination of malic acid in the wine, and produced a three-fold increase in ethyl acetate.
