= Hanseniaspora gamundiae =

Scientific classification
- Kingdom: Fungi
- Division: Ascomycota
- Class: Saccharomycetes
- Order: Saccharomycetales
- Family: Saccharomycodaceae
- Genus: Hanseniaspora
- Species: H. gamundiae

Binomial name
- Hanseniaspora gamundiae Libkind, Čadež & Hittinger 2019

Species of yeast

Hanseniaspora gamundiae is a species of yeast in the family Saccharomycodaceae. It has been isolated from the fruiting bodies of Cyttaria hariotii mushrooms in Patagonia and is likely responsible for the early stages of fermentation of an alcoholic chicha produced from the mushrooms.

== Taxonomy ==
Samples of H. gamundiae were first isolated from samples taken from the stromata of edible Cyttaria hariotii mushrooms growing on southern beech trees in Patagonia in Spring 2007. Genetic testing revealed that the yeast was a previously undescribed species and it was given the specific epithet "gamundiae" in honor of Dr. Irma Gamundi in Argentina in recognition for her taxonomic work with fungi and particularly with the Cyttaria genus.

Genetic sequencing shows that the species is closely related to Hanseniaspora taiwanica and Hanseniaspora occidentalis.

== Description ==
Microscopic examination of the yeast cells in YM liquid medium after 48 hours at 25°C reveals cells that are 4.3 to 15.7 μm by 2.4 to 4.7 μm in size, apiculate, ovoid to elongate, appearing singly or in pairs. Reproduction is by budding, which occurs at both poles of the cell. In broth culture, sediment is present, and after one month a very thin ring is formed.

Colonies that are grown on malt agar for one month at 25 °C appear cream-colored, butyrous, glossy, and smooth. Growth is flat to slightly raised at the center, with an entire to slightly undulating margin. The yeast forms poorly developed pseudohyphae on cornmeal agar. The yeast has been observed to form one to two spherical and warty ascospores when grown for at least two weeks on 5% Difco malt extract agar.

The yeast can ferment glucose and can weakly ferment sucrose, but not galactose, cellobiose, maltose, or lactose. The yeast can assimilate glucose, sucrose, cellobiose, arbutin, and salicin. It has a positive growth rate at 30°C, but there is no growth at 35°C. It can grow on agar media containing 10% sodium chloride but absent on media with 16% sodium chloride. Growth on agar with 50% glucose-yeast extract agar, 1% acetic acid, and 0.01% cycloheximide is absent.

== Ecology ==
The species was collected during a study of yeasts that were present on species of Cyttaria mushrooms. Mature mushrooms are composed of up to 10.2% of the fructose, glucose, and sucrose, which resembles the composition of grape juice, a habitat that is well-known to contain Hanseniaspora species. The Mapuche people of Patagonia consumed the Cyttaria in several ways, including in the production of the alcoholic beverage chicha. They used the mushrooms by collecting the mature stomata and either squeezing them to obtain the juice, or by leaving the stromata in cooled boiled water for a few days, after which it spontaneously ferments. Due to the composition of yeasts found in Cyttaria, it is believed that Hanseniaspora gamundiae plays a significant role in the early stages of the fermentation of the beverage, followed by naturally occurring Saccharomyces cerevisiae, Saccharomyces uvarum, or Saccharomyces eubayanus species.
