= Hanseniaspora pseudoguilliermondii =

Scientific classification
- Domain: Eukaryota
- Kingdom: Fungi
- Division: Ascomycota
- Class: Saccharomycetes
- Order: Saccharomycetales
- Family: Saccharomycodaceae
- Genus: Hanseniaspora
- Species: H. pseudoguilliermondii

Binomial name
- Hanseniaspora pseudoguilliermondii Čadež, Raspor & M.Th. Smith 2006

Species of yeast

Hanseniaspora pseudoguilliermondii is a species of yeast in the family Saccharomycetaceae. Originally isolated from orange juice concentrate, it has been found on fruit and fruit juices in locations around the world. It has also been observed forming hybrids with Hanseniaspora opuntiae.

== Taxonomy ==
A sample of H. pseudoguilliermondii was first isolated from orange juice concentrate in Georgia, USA. It was studied in 2003 by Neža Čadež, Gé A. Poot, Peter Raspor, and Maudy Th. Smith, who found that it could not be distinguished from Hanseniaspora guilliermondii using physiological criteria. After further testing in 2006, Čadež, Raspor, and Smith offered a description of the species, based upon DNA testing, that they called Hanseniaspora pseudoguilliermondii. The specific epithet "pseudoguilliermondii" was chosen because the species is similar to H. guilliermondii.

== Description ==
Microscopic examination of the yeast cells in YM liquid medium after 48 hours at 25°C reveals cells that are 2.2 to 8.7 μm by 1.6 to 4.2 μm in size, apiculate, ovoid to elongate, appearing singly or in pairs. Reproduction is by budding, which occurs at both poles of the cell. In broth culture, sediment is present, and after one month a very thin ring and a sediment is formed.

Colonies that are grown on malt agar for one month at 25°C appear cream-colored, butyrous, glossy, and smooth. Growth is flat to slightly raised at the center, with an entire to slightly undulating margin. The yeast forms poorly developed pseudohyphae on cornmeal or potato agar. The yeast has been observed to form four hat-shaped ascospores when grown for at least seven days on 5% Difco malt extract agar.

The yeast can ferment glucose and cellobiose, but not galactose, sucrose, maltose, lactose, raffinose or trehalose. It has a positive growth rate at 37°C, but there is no growth at 40°C. It can grow on agar media containing 0.1% cycloheximide and 10% sodium but growth on 50% glucose-yeast extract agar is weak.

== Ecology ==
The original strain of this species was isolated from orange juice concentrate. It has also been isolated from fruit and fermenting fruit juices in The Philippines, Réunion, and French Guiana. It has been observed to form hybrids with Hanseniaspora opuntiae.

It is not known whether it has any human pathogenic potential, but it can grow at a normal body temperature.
