= Hanseniaspora clermontiae =

Scientific classification
- Domain: Eukaryota
- Kingdom: Fungi
- Division: Ascomycota
- Class: Saccharomycetes
- Order: Saccharomycetales
- Family: Saccharomycodaceae
- Genus: Hanseniaspora
- Species: H. clermontiae

Binomial name
- Hanseniaspora clermontiae Čadež, Poot, Raspor & M.Th. Smith 2003

Species of fungus

Hanseniaspora clermontiae is a species of yeast in the family Saccharomycetaceae. It was first isolated from stem rot occurring in a lobelioid plant in Hawaii, and may be endemic to the Hawaiian Islands.

== Taxonomy ==
The species was first described by Neža Čadež, Gé A. Poot, Peter Raspor, and Maudy Th. Smith in 2003 after isolating a sample in stem rot of a Clermontia plant in Hawaii. The specific epithet is derived from the genus name of the host plant where it was first isolated.

== Description ==
Microscopic examination of the yeast cells in YM liquid medium after 48 hours at 25°C reveals cells that are 3.5 to 18 μm by 2.5 to 5.0 μm in size, apiculate, ovoid to elongate, appearing singly or in pairs. Reproduction is by budding, which occurs at both poles of the cell. In broth culture, sediment is present, and after one month a very thin ring is formed.

Colonies that are grown on malt agar for one month at 25°C appear cream-colored, butyrous, and smooth. Growth is flat to slightly raised at the center, with an entire to slightly undulating margin. The yeast forms poorly-developed pseudohyphae on cornmeal or potato agar. The yeast has been observed to form two to four hat-shaped ascospores when grown for two weeks on 5% Difco malt extract agar.

The yeast can ferment glucose and cellobiose, but not galactose, sucrose, maltose, lactose, raffinose or trehalose. It has a positive growth rate at 25°C, but no growth at 30°C or above. It can grow on agar media containing 0.1% cycloheximide and 10% sodium but growth on 50% glucose-yeast extract agar is weak.

== Ecology ==
The type sample was obtained in Hawaii, and in 2005, Marc-André Lachance described the species as possibly endemic to the Hawaiian Islands. It is considered unlikely to be a human pathogen due to its inability to grow at human body temperatures.
