= Ralph L. Obendorf =

American plant biologist (born 1938)

Ralph Louis Obendorf
- Born: July 11, 1938 (age 88); Ripley County, Indiana
- Education: Purdue University, B.S 1960; University of California at Davis M.S. 1962, Ph.D. 1966
- Awards: Honorary doctorate 2002 (University of Warmia and Mazury in Olsztyn, Poland)
- Scientific career
- Fields: Biochemistry, crop physiology, plant physiology
- Workplaces: Cornell University

Ralph Louis Obendorf (born July 11, 1938) is an Emeritus Professor of Crop Physiology at Cornell University who is notable for his research on the health-related components in seeds, particularly fagopyritol A1, which is isosteric to an insulin mediator believed to be deficient in subjects with non-insulin dependent diabetes mellitus (NIDDM or type II diabetes) and polyendocrine metabolic ovarian syndrome (PMOS), which affects 10% of women of reproductive age.

== Career ==
Obendorf joined the Cornell University faculty as an assistant professor in 1966, became an associate professor in 1971 and a Full Professor in 1978. He became Professor Emeritus in the School of Integrative Plant Science, Section of Soil and Crop Sciences, Cornell University, 2014–present. He was a visiting scientist at the Institute for Cancer Research Fox Chase Cancer Center in Philadelphia in 1972–73, and 1983 he was a visiting plant physiologist at the Plant Growth Laboratory, University of California at Davis. He was a visiting scientist in Chemical Physiology of Plants, Institut für Pflanzenphysiologie, University of Vienna in 1997. Obendorf was a visiting scholar at the University of California at San Diego in 2004 and 2013–present.

=== Research ===
Obendorf's research on the biology of seeds included characterizing the molecular structure and synthesis of galactosyl cyclitols; characterizing the enzymes and genes regulating pathways of soluble carbohydrate biosynthesis and degradation; studying the regulation of embryo growth, maturation, and germination in vitro and in planta. Obendorf has also done research on somatic embryogenesis, desiccation tolerance, seed water relations; the purification and characterization of pectin methyl esterase. He has studied cell wall polysaccharides and the role of sugars, cyclitols and methanol in seed deterioration and germplasm preservation. His early work characterized imbibitional chilling in soybean, maize and sorghum, stelar lesions and hydrational damage, respiration, energy metabolism and transcription.

==== Flatulence ====
Desiccation tolerance in maturing seeds involves the accumulation of non-reducing galactosyl sucrose oligosaccharides such as stachyose and raffinose. These galactosyl sucrose oligosaccharides cause flatulence in animals and human beings because human beings do not have the enzyme, α-galactosidase to cleave the α-galactosyl linkage. Consequently, the intact galactosyl sucrose oligosaccharide is not absorbed by the digestive tract and the bacteria in the colon use it as a substrate that results in gas formation. As a result of the relationship found between the oligosaccharides and flatulence, the Protein Advisory Group of the United Nations has recommended that the elimination of flatulence associated with the consumption of foods be one of the research priorities. However, Obendorf found that the accumulation of the flatulence-producing oligosaccharides is required for seed germinability and seed desiccation tolerance. Thus the elimination of the flatulence-producing oligosaccharides from seeds would result in a deterioration of the crop that produces them.

According to Obendorf,

Breeding seed plants for quality embryos emphasizes elimination of flatulence-producing oligosaccharides. Before this effort proceeds too far, we need to determine if the flatulence-producing maturation sugars are required for desiccation tolerance and storability of seed germplasm, the threshold level required, and if biosynthesis of the stachyose series oligosaccharides and/or oligogalactocyclitols can be regulated genetically and biochemically in parallel with altered desiccation tolerance and storability of seed germplasm.

In 1722, Jonathan Swift wrote a pamphlet entitled, The Benefit of Farting Explain'd: or, The fundament-All Cause of the Distempers Incident to the Fair-Sex.... Recent research indicates that flatulence-producing oligosaccharides may have health benefits for human beings as well as for beans.

=== Teaching ===
Obendorf's teaching responsibilities includedTeaching Experience, Undergraduate Research, Independent Research in Biology, Introduction to Research Methods, Field Crop Systems, and Seed Biology with an emphasis on training society ready graduates. Obendorf trained more than 230 undergraduates in research, resulting in 52 undergraduate coauthors on refereed journal papers. Obendorf has won numerous teaching awards.

== Awards ==
In 1987, Obendorf won a Medal from Poznan Agriculture University, and a Medal from the Polish Ministry of Agriculture. In 1992, he won a Medal from Warsaw Agricultural University. In 2008 he was presented by Medal by Ryszard J. Górecki, Rector of the University of Warmia and Mazury, Olsztyn, Poland.

Obendorf was made an Elected Fellow of the Crop Science Society of America in 1995, an Elected Fellow of the American Society of Agronomy in 1996 and an Elected Fellow of the American Association for the Advancement of Science (AAAS) in 2004 and an Elected Fifty-year Life Member in 2016.

Obendorf was given an Honorary doctorate at the University of Warmia and Mazury in Olsztyn, Poland in 2002

== Personal life ==
Ralph Obendorf was born on July 11, 1938, in Ripley County, Indiana to Louis Eugene and Miriam Clara (Stegemoller) Obendorf. Obendorf grew up in Indiana. Obendorf married Sharon Kay Randel on March 11, 1967. They have two children: Michael Bradley Obendorf and Kevin Andrew Obendorf.
