= Hanseniaspora nectarophila =

Scientific classification
- Kingdom: Fungi
- Division: Ascomycota
- Class: Saccharomycetes
- Order: Saccharomycetales
- Family: Saccharomycodaceae
- Genus: Hanseniaspora
- Species: H. nectarophila

Binomial name
- Hanseniaspora nectarophila N. Čadež, F.C. Pagnocca, P. Raspor and C.A. Rosa, 2014

Species of fungus

Hanseniaspora nectarophila is a species of fungus that occurs as a yeast.

== Discovery ==
H. nectarophila was first described in 2014 from specimens collected from Syphocampylus corymbiferus flowers from a farm in Pindamonhangaba, São Paulo, Brazil. Its name originates from the flower nectar that the type strain was collected from.

== Growth and morphology ==
H. nectarophila cells have been described as "ovoid to elongate" in shape, with sizes ranging from 3.5–8.0 μm in length and 1.8–5.0 μm in width. Cells have been seen to occur singly, in pairs, or in short chains. Budding is largely bipolar, although occasionally is multilateral, which is a rare feature among Hanseniaspora. Colonies grown on malt agar appear cream-colored, glossy, and smooth, with undulating edges. The asci are reported to contain one or two ascospores, which are spherical and warty in appearance.

Glucose and trehalose are fermented by H. nectarophila; trehalose fermentation is uncommon among its closest relatives, making trehalose fermentation a possible identifying trait. Other carbon sources used by H. nectarophila include cellobiose, salicin, and arbutin; many common sugars such as lactose and galactose are not metabolized.

== Presence in food and drink manufacturing ==
H. nectarophila has been found to be a common species in grape juice before and after fermentation in wineries in Cyprus, being particularly common in the Koilani area, as well as in Yunnan Province, China. Its effect on wine fermentation is not currently understood. H. nectarophila has also been isolated from orange peels from an orange processing facility in Reggio Calabria, Italy.
