= Killer yeast =

Strain of yeast that secretes proteins toxic to other yeast

A killer yeast is a yeast, such as certain strains of Saccharomyces cerevisiae, that is able to secrete one of a number of toxic proteins lethal to susceptible cells of their own or similar species. The "killer toxins" are polypeptides that often function by creating pores in the cell membranes of the target. The yeast cells that produce the protein are intrinsically immune to its effects. Killer yeast strains can be a problem in commercial processing because they can kill desirable strains. The killer yeast system was first described in 1963. Study of the killer toxins helped to better understand the secretion pathway of yeast, which is similar to those of more complex eukaryotes. It also can be used in treatment of some diseases, mainly those caused by fungi.

== In Saccharomyces cerevisiae ==
The best-characterized toxin system is from a strain of Saccharomyces cerevisiae that was found to spoil brewing of beer. It encodes toxins by a double-stranded RNA virus that are translated to a precursor protein, cleaved and secreted outside of the cells, where they may affect susceptible yeast. Other killer systems can exist in S. cerevisiae, such as KHR1 and KHS1 genes encoded on chromosomes IX and V, respectively.

=== RNA virus ===
The virus L-A is an icosahedral virus of S. cerevisiae comprising a 4.6 kb genomic segment and several satellite double-stranded RNA sequences, called M dsRNAs. The genomic segment encodes for the viral coat protein and a protein which replicates the viral genomes. The M dsRNAs encode the toxin, of which there are at least three variants in S. cerevisiae, and many more variants across all species.

L-A virus uses yeast Ski complex (super killer) and MAK (maintenance of killer) chromosomal genes for its preservation in the cell. The virus is not released into the environment, but spreads between cells during yeast mating. The family of Totiviridae in general helps M-type dsRNAs in a wide variety of yeasts.

=== Toxins ===
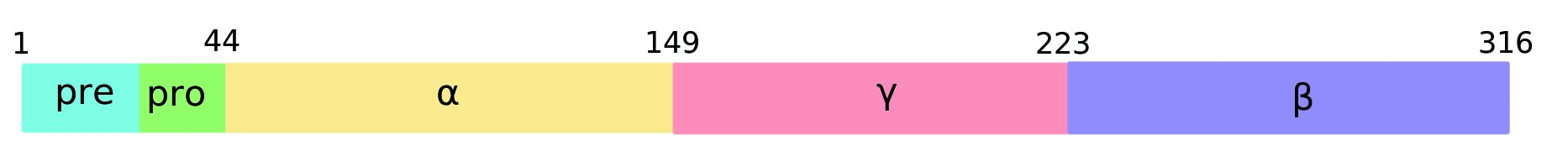
The K1 preprotoxin, showing the α and β chains which make up the K1 toxin. The numbers count amino acid residues.

The initial protein product from translation of the M dsRNA is called the preprotoxin, which is targeted to the yeast secretory pathway. The preprotoxin is processed and cleaved to produce an α/β dimer, which is the active form of the toxin, and is released into the environment.

The two most studied variant toxins in S. cerevisiae are K1 and K28. There are numerous apparently unrelated M dsRNAs, their only similarity being their genome and preprotoxin organization.

K1 binds to the β-1,6-D-glucan receptor on the target cell wall, moves inside, and then binds to the plasma membrane receptor Kre1p. It forms a cation-selective ion channel in the membrane, which is lethal to the cell.

K28 uses the α-1,6-mannoprotein receptor to enter the cell, and utilizes the secretory pathway in reverse by displaying the endoplasmic reticulum HDEL signal. From the ER, K28 moves into the cytoplasm and shuts down DNA synthesis in the nucleus, triggering apoptosis.

=== Immunity ===
Sesti, Shih, Nikolaeva and Goldstein (2001) claimed that K1 inhibits the TOK1 membrane potassium channel before secretion, and although the toxin reenters through the cell wall it is unable to reactivate TOK1. However Breinig, Tipper and Schmitt (2002) showed that the TOK1 channel was not the primary receptor for K1, and that TOK1 inhibition does not confer immunity. Vališ, Mašek, Novotná, Pospíšek and Janderová (2006) experimented with mutants which produce K1 but do not have immunity to it, and suggested that cell membrane receptors were being degraded in the secretion pathway of immune cells, apparently due to the actions of unprocessed α chains.

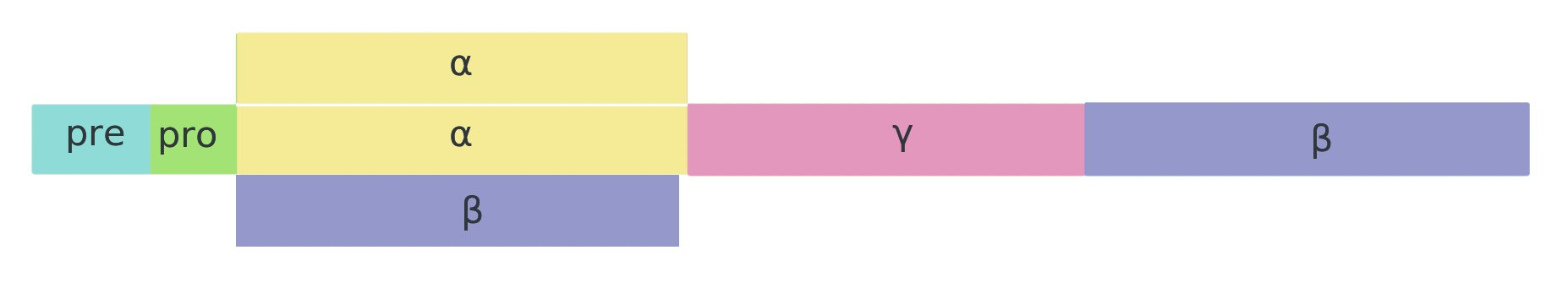
The K28 preprotoxin forms a complex with the K28 α/β dimer, neutralizing it.

Breinig, Sendzik, Eisfeld and Schmitt (2006) showed that K28 toxin is neutralized in toxin-expressing cells by the α chain in the cytosol, which has not yet been fully processed and still contains part of a γ chain attached to the C terminus. The uncleaved α chain neutralizes the K28 toxin by forming a complex with it.

== In Kluyveromyces lactis ==
Killer properties in Kluyveromyces lactis are associated with linear DNA plasmids, which have on their 5'end associated proteins, which enable them to replicate themselves in a way similar to adenoviruses. It is an example of protein priming in DNA replication. MAK genes are not known. The toxin consists of three subunits, which are matured in golgi complex by signal peptidase and glycosylated.

The mechanism of action appears to be the inhibition of adenylate cyclase in sensitive cells. Affected cells are arrested in G1 phase and lose viability.

== In other yeasts ==
Toxin systems are found in some other yeasts:

- Pichia and Williopsis
- Hanseniaspora uvarum
- Zygosaccharomyces bailii
- Ustilago maydis, a smut fungus that produces toxins of the killer toxin Kp4 family.
- Debaryomyces hansenii

== Use of toxins ==
The susceptibility to toxins varies greatly between yeast species and strains. Several experiments have made use of this to reliably identify strains. Morace, Archibusacci, Sestito and Polonelli (1984) used the toxins produced by 25 species of yeasts to differentiate between 112 pathogenic strains, based on their sensitivity to each toxin. This was extended by Morace et al. (1989) to use toxins to differentiate between 58 bacterial cultures. Vaughan-Martini, Cardinali and Martini (1996) used 24 strains of killer yeast from 13 species to find a resistance signature for each of 13 strains of S. cerevisiae which were used as starters in wine-making. It was shown that sensitivity to toxins could be used to discriminate between 91 strains of Candida albicans and 223 other Candida strains.

Others experimented with using killer yeasts to control undesirable yeasts. Palpacelli, Ciani and Rosini (1991) found that Kluyveromyces phaffii was effective against Kloeckera apiculata, Saccharomycodes ludwigii and Zygosaccharomyces rouxii – all of which cause problems in the food industry. Polonelli et al. (1994) used a killer yeast to vaccinate against C. albicans in rats. Lowes et al. (2000) created a synthetic gene for the toxin HMK normally produced by Williopsis mrakii, which they inserted into Aspergillus niger and showed that the engineered strain could control aerobic spoilage in maize silage and yoghurt. A toxin-producing strain of Kluyveromyces phaffii to control apiculate yeasts in wine-making. A toxin produced by Candida nodaensis was effective at preventing spoilage of highly salted food by yeasts.

Several experiments suggest that antibodies that mimic the biological activity of killer toxins have application as antifungal agents.

Killer yeasts from flowers of Indian medicinal plants were isolated and the effect of their killer toxin was determined on sensitive yeast cells as well as fungal pathogens. The toxin of Saccharomyces cerevisiae and Pichia kluyveri inhibited Dekkera anomala accumulating methylene blue cells on Yeast Extract Peptone Dextrose agar (pH 4.2) at 21 °C. There was no inhibition of growth or competition between the yeast cells in the mixed population of S. cerevisiae isolated from Acalypha indica. S. cerevisiae and P. kluyveri were found to tolerate 50% and 40% glucose, while D. anomala tolerated 40% glucose. Both S. cerevisiae and P. kluyveri did not inhibit the growth of Aspergillus niger.

== Control methods ==
Young and Yagiu (1978) experimented with methods of curing killer yeasts. They found that using a cycloheximine solution at 0.05 ppm was effective in eliminating killer activity in one strain of S. cerevisiae. Incubating the yeast at 37 °C eliminated activity in another strain. The methods were not effective at reducing toxin production in other yeast species. Many toxins are sensitive to pH levels; for example, K1 is permanently inactivated at pH levels over 6.5.

The greatest potential for control of killer yeasts appears to be the addition of the L-A virus and M dsRNA, or an equivalent gene, into the industrially desirable variants of yeast, so they achieve immunity to the toxin, and also kill competing strains.

== See also ==
- Yeast in winemaking
