= Galactinol—sucrose galactosyltransferase =

Class of enzymes

Galactinol-sucrose galactosyltransferase

Identifiers
- EC no.: 2.4.1.82
- CAS no.: 62213-45-0

Databases
- IntEnz: IntEnz view
- BRENDA: BRENDA entry
- ExPASy: NiceZyme view
- KEGG: KEGG entry
- MetaCyc: metabolic pathway
- PRIAM: profile
- PDB structures: RCSB PDB PDBe PDBsum
- Gene Ontology: AmiGO / QuickGO
Search
- PMC: articles
- PubMed: articles
- NCBI: proteins

Galactinol-sucrose galactosyltransferase (EC 2.4.1.82) is an enzyme that catalyzes the chemical reaction

galactinol
+
sucrose
inositol
+
raffinose

The two substrates of this enzyme characterised from the seeds of Vicia faba are galactinol (α-D-galactosyl-(1->3)-1D-myo-inositol) and sucrose. The galactose sugar part of galactinol is transferred to the primary alcohol in the glucopyranose ring of the sucrose, forming the trisaccharide, raffinose, with inositol as a byproduct.

This enzyme belongs to the family of glycosyltransferases, specifically the hexosyltransferases. The systematic name of this enzyme class is alpha-D-galactosyl-(1->3)-myo-inositol:sucrose 6-alpha-D-galactosyltransferase. Other names in common use include 1-alpha-D-galactosyl-myo-inositol:sucrose, and 6-alpha-D-galactosyltransferase. This enzyme participates in galactose metabolism.
