= Galactinol—raffinose galactosyltransferase =

Class of enzymes

Galactinol-raffinose galactosyltransferase

Identifiers
- EC no.: 2.4.1.67
- CAS no.: 37277-70-6

Databases
- IntEnz: IntEnz view
- BRENDA: BRENDA entry
- ExPASy: NiceZyme view
- KEGG: KEGG entry
- MetaCyc: metabolic pathway
- PRIAM: profile
- PDB structures: RCSB PDB PDBe PDBsum
- Gene Ontology: AmiGO / QuickGO
Search
- PMC: articles
- PubMed: articles
- NCBI: proteins

Galactinol-raffinose galactosyltransferase (EC 2.4.1.67) is an enzyme that catalyzes the chemical reaction

galactinol
+
raffinose
inositol
+
stachyose

The two substrates of this enzyme are galactinol and raffinose. Its products are inositol (myo-inositol) and the tetrasaccharide, stachyose. The enzyme has been characterised from Vicia faba.

This enzyme participates in galactose metabolism.

== Nomenclature ==
This enzyme belongs to the family of glycosyltransferases, specifically the hexosyltransferases. The systematic name of this enzyme class is alpha-D-galactosyl-(1→3)-myo-inositol:raffinose galactosyltransferase. Other names in common use include galactinol-raffinose galactosyltransferase, and stachyose synthetase.
