= Armed and disarmed saccharides =

The armed/disarmed approach to glycosylation is an effective way to prevent sugar molecules from self-glycosylation when synthesizing disaccharides. This approach was first recognized when acetylated sugars only acted as glycosyl acceptors when reacted with benzylated sugars. The acetylated sugars were termed “disarmed” while the benzylated sugars were termed “armed”.

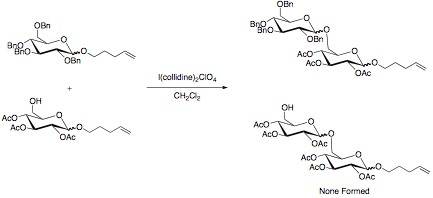

== Electronic Effect ==
The selectivity in the reaction is due to the stronger electron withdrawing power of the esters compared to the ethers. A stronger electron withdrawing substituent leads to a greater destabilization of the oxocarbenium ion. This slows this reaction pathway, and allows for disaccharide formation to occur with the benzylated sugar. Other effective electron withdrawing groups that have shown selectivity are halogens and azido groups, while deoxygenation has been proven an effective tool in “arming” sugars.

== Torsional Effect ==
Disarming sugars can also be accomplished by adding 1,3-dioxane and 1,3-dioxolane protecting groups onto sugars. These protecting groups “lock” the sugars into a rigid chair conformation. When the sugar forms the necessary oxocarbenium ion, it flattens at the anomeric position. This change in configuration is a high-energy transformation when cyclic protecting groups are present, and leads to the sugar being “disarmed”. These groups can be easily removed following glycosylation, effectively “arming” the sugar, and allowing for control of the glycosylation.

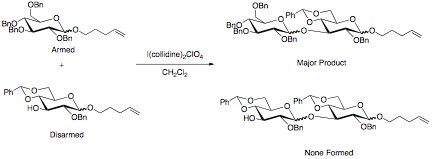

Further work has shown that the effect of 1,3-dioxanes and 1,3-dioxolanes on disarming sugars can be attributed to the electronics of the systems as well as torsional strain. When a 1,3-dioxane is formed between O-4 and O-6, the oxygens adapt an anti-periplanar geometry with O-5. This orientation allows for hyperconjugation of O-5 to O-4 and O-6, removing electron density from O-5. The loss of electron density at O-5 results in a destabilization of the oxocarbenium ion, slowing its formation, and “disarming” the sugar. Experiments were conducted by altering the configuration of the O-6 and examining the rate of hydrolysis of these compounds. The gauche-gauche orientation seen in the second example has a higher rate of hydrolysis due to its longer bond length. The hydrogen at C-5 is able to hyperconjugate with O-6, effectively lengthening the bond. This increase in bond length decreases the inductive electron withdrawing ability of O-6, causing a higher rate of hydrolysis than the other two conformations. The effect of anti-periplanar orientation is also visible in comparing glucopyranose and galactopyranose hydrolysis. Glucopyranose has an anti-perplanar orientation between O-4 and O-5, while galactopyranose does not and shows the appropriate increase in reactivity.

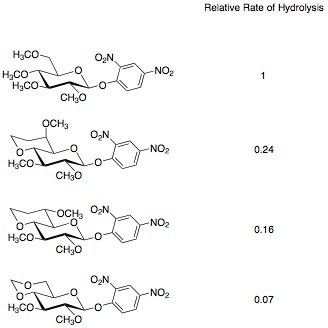

== Synthetic Advantage ==
The advantage of “arming” and “disarming” glycosyl donors lies in their synthetic use. By disarming the glycosyl, a selective coupling can be achieved. The disarmed portion of the disaccharide can then be armed through selective deprotection. The disaccharide can then be coupled to a disarmed sugar. This process can be repeated as many times as necessary to achieve an efficient synthesis of a desired oligosaccharide with minimal loss of material to undesired coupling. This can be especially useful in “one-pot” synthetic methods. In these methods, multiple sugars are added to the reaction mixture simultaneously and multiple glycosidic bonds are formed sequentially. First, one of the sugars is armed as the glycosyl donor, and reacts quickly with a second sugar, the glycosyl acceptor. In a second step the protecting group on the non-reducing sugar is deprotected in solution, revealing a free hydroxyl group that acts as a glycosyl acceptor. This reacts with a disarmed donor, which, because it forms the oxocarbenium ion at a slower rate, only reacts after the first step has already occurred, thus producing the desired trisaccharide.

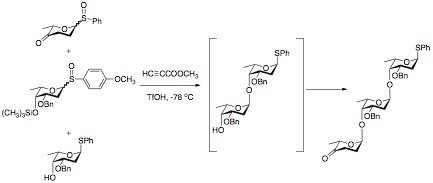

== See also ==
- Chemical glycosylation
- Carbohydrate synthesis
- Carbohydrate chemistry
