= Streptothricin hydrolase =

Class of enzymes

Identifiers
- EC no.: 3.5.2.19

Databases
- BRENDA: enzyme data
- ExPASy: NiceZyme view
- KEGG: enzyme entry
- MetaCyc: metabolic pathway
- Rhea: reactions
- PDB structures: RCSB PDB PDBe PDBsum
Search
- PMC: articles
- PubMed: articles
- NCBI: proteins

Streptothricin hydrolase (EC 3.5.2.19, sttH (gene)) is an enzyme with systematic name streptothricin-F hydrolase. It catalyses the hydrolysis of the cyclic amide, streptothricin F, to the corresponding open-chain amino acid and this reaction confers resistance to the action of the aminoglycoside antibiotic in Streptomyces albulus and Streptomyces noursei.

streptothricin F
H_{2}O
streptothricin F acid

The enzyme also catalyses the hydrolysis of streptothricin-D to streptothricin-D acid.
