= VOPP1 =

Human gene

Identifiers
- Aliases: VOPP1, ECOP, GASP, vesicular, overexpressed in cancer, prosurvival protein 1, WBP1L2, WBP1/VOPP1 family member, VOPP1 WW domain binding protein
- External IDs: OMIM: 611915; MGI: 2141658; GeneCards: VOPP1

Gene location (Human)
Chr.	Chromosome 7 (human)
Band	7p11.2	Start	55,436,056 bp
Band	7p11.2	End	55,572,988 bp

Gene location (Mouse)
Chr.	Chromosome 6 (mouse)
Band	6|6 B3	Start	57,704,792 bp
Band	6|6 B3	End	57,802,144 bp
RNA expression pattern
Bgee	Human / Mouse (ortholog); Top expressed in: thymus; beta cell; ventricular zone; lymph node; stromal cell of endometrium; pylorus; epithelium of nasopharynx; parotid gland; lateral nuclear group of thalamus; cecum / Top expressed in: neural layer of retina; saccule; otic placode; lacrimal gland; blood; retinal pigment epithelium; otic vesicle; parotid gland; medullary collecting duct; seminal vesicula; More reference expression data
BioGPS	n/a
Gene ontology
Molecular function	signal transducer activity
Cellular component	integral component of membrane; integral component of organelle membrane; endosome; cytoplasmic vesicle membrane; membrane; cytoplasmic vesicle
Biological process	regulation of transcription, DNA-templated; transcription, DNA-templated
Sources:Amigo / QuickGO
Orthologs
Databases	NCBI: entry; OMA: entry
Species	Human	Mouse
Entrez	81552	232023
Ensembl	ENSG00000154978	ENSMUSG00000037788
UniProt	Q96AW1	Q8R1C3
RefSeq (mRNA)	NM_001284282; NM_001284283; NM_001284284; NM_030796; NM_001321242 NM_001321243; NM_001321244; NM_001321246; NM_001321247; NM_001321248; NM_001321249; NM_001321250; NM_001321251	NM_146168
RefSeq (protein)	NP_001271211; NP_001271212; NP_001271213; NP_001308171; NP_001308172 NP_001308173; NP_001308175; NP_001308176; NP_001308177; NP_001308178; NP_001308179; NP_001308180; NP_110423	NP_666280
Location (UCSC)	Chr 7: 55.44 – 55.57 Mb	Chr 6: 57.7 – 57.8 Mb
PubMed search
- Wikidata
View/Edit Human	View/Edit Mouse

WW domain binding protein VOPP1, also known as ECOP, is a protein that in humans is encoded by the gene VOPP1. The abbreviation VOPP1 comes from a previous name ("Vesicular, overexpressed in cancer, prosurvival protein 1").

It is expressed in various forms of cancer, and was first identified because it was frequently amplified together with the receptor gene EGFR in tumors.

== Gene ==
VOPP1 is located on chromosome 7p11.2 near the EGFR oncogene, and contains 15 exons. Its location near EGFR has been suggested as a reason for why VOPP1 is co-amplified in cancers: in that it may lead to the synchronous amplification.

== Function ==
Research suggests that VOPP1 is a vesicle-localized protein that balances inflammation and signaling through its effects on the NF-κB pathway. It is best known for enabling enzyme-binding activity that regulates the transcription factor NF-kappaB. VOPP1 influences NF-kappaB transcriptional activity and the associated apoptotic response in an IkappaBalpha-dependent manner.

== Discovery ==
First discovered in the early 2000s, ECOP was found from genomic studies that were done on glioblastoma multiforme, which is a very strong, fast-growing, and aggressive type of brain cancer. This type of tumor originates from glial cells. This brain cancer is associated with high rates of EGFR gene amplification, which is what originally caused it to catch the researchers attention because of the interaction between the EGFR gene and the VOPP1 protein.

EGFR itself is located in a chromosomal region that often undergoes amplification, which in turn causes the neighboring genes that are around it to be amplified at the same time. The VOPP1 gene was noticed to have had a very obvious over expression in glioblastoma tumors. These types of tumors also had this EGFR amplification, so these two genes were immediately considered to have a relationship since they were next to one another and synchronously amplified. In the early stages of characterizing the gene, it was implied that the VOPP1-encoded protein must be vesicle-associated because it is also an intracellular protein. This protein additionally is a pro-survival protein, so with cancer itself, it works as a part in the increase of cancer cells and even can move the cells to other areas all from within its role in the cell. Eventually, this discovery led to other names being proposed for this protein for the other types of uses it has.

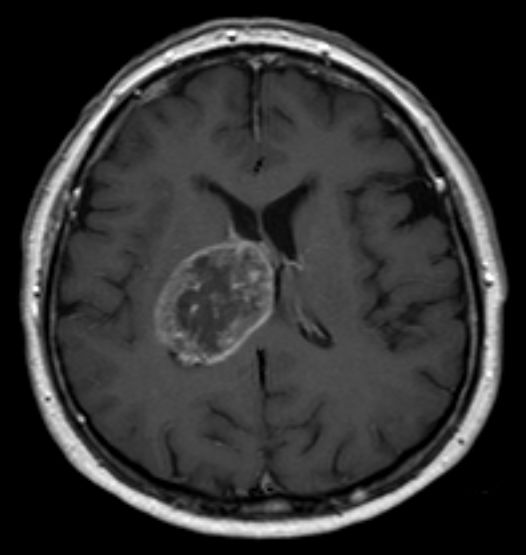
Axial view of an MRI showing a glioblastoma multiforme brain tumor

The study done by Park and James (2005) found that the protein balances NF-kB activity while also playing a role in apoptotic responses further downstream of inflammatory signaling. The work in their study analyzed ECOP as an active regulator of cell signaling instead of the previous assumptions in which that it was a spectator of EGFR amplification, which is what was thought to be the case at the beginning of ECOP's discovery. Subsequent research over time and within their study continued to find greater relevance of ECOP in the overexpression of a multitude of cancers, such as gastric, lung, and head and neck cancers, without simply focusing on glioblastomas. ECOP plays a role in many different cancerous tumors because it does not kill off the cells or promote any cell death, which makes the cancer cells continue to replicate, build, and multiply. This is exactly how cancer thrives because it wants to rapidly continue to add more and more cells until it eventually becomes a tumor.

== Protein ==
ECOP is considered to be a vesicle-localized protein and it is found intracellular within a cell membrane. It can also be found supplemented within more specific compartments like endosomes, lysosomes, and other secretory vesicles.

The sequence of the protein itself hints that it can be an adaptor or scaffolding protein to help coordinate intracellular signaling. It is not found in the nucleus majority of the time, which supports the idea of ECOP being an upstream regulator of cytosolic signaling pathways, and specifically the NF-kB pathway. The localization of ECOP tends to be influenced by receptor activation, cellular stress, and proteolytic pathways. In cancer studies, it has been found ECOP levels may result from genomic amplification, transcriptional up regulation, or the protein becoming stabilized. High expression of ECOP is seen in various cancers (see § Clinical significance).

== Function ==
=== Regulation of NF-kB Signaling ===
ECOP was most commonly described as being significant in the regulation of the NF-kB transcription pathway. This pathway controls genes involved in processes like inflammation, immunity, cell survival, and apoptosis resistance. When in resting state, the NF-kB pathway is inactive in the cytoplasm through binding to IkBa, which is a natural inhibitor for the pathway. Other cellular parts involved like TNFa (Tumor Necrosis Factor-alpha) or IL-1B (interleukin-1 beta) trigger the phosphorylation and degradation of interleukin-1 beta. This proceeds to let the p65 NF-kB subunit to pass into the nucleus and therefore activate gene transcription to duplicate the DNA to RNA and express the gene. ECOP was able to be found as an established and positive regulator of NF-kB activation because it contributes to the survival signaling of cancers and the cells within it as well.

=== Anti-apoptotic effects ===
ECOP enhances expression of genes involved in cell survival when it is regulating the NF-kB pathway. Turning ECOP off leads to possibility of apoptosis in response to many various factors such as, TNFa, cycloheximide, oxidative stress, and chemotherapeutic agents.

Also, the cells lacking ECOP show an increase in nuclear fragmentation, PARP cleavage, and death signaling. On the other hand, high ECOP expression reflects partial resistance to apoptotic stimuli where the cells do not go through cell death and there will continue to be more cells produced over time within replacement of any other ones. This would cause an overflow of cells eventually leading to a tumor forming and cancer being diagnosed. There are potential proposals that ECOP could have more of a functional role in receptor trafficking because it is localized in a vesicle, so it could be a possibility, but further research would need to be done and supported before any confirmations on this could happen.

== Clinical significance ==
VOPP1 has characteristics that suggest it is an oncogene and so it has become a target of research in cancer therapy. It has consistently been implicated in various tumors, including glioblastomas, gastric adenocarcinoma, and squamous-cell carcinomas.

== Other names ==
- Most commonly labeled as VOPP1 (domain binding protein)
- GASP (Glioblastoma-amplified secreted protein)
- WBP1L2 (alternative)
- EGFR, co-amplified and over-expressed protein
