= Saccharomycodes =

Scientific classification
- Kingdom: Fungi
- Division: Ascomycota
- Class: Saccharomycetes
- Order: Saccharomycetales
- Family: Saccharomycodaceae
- Genus: Saccharomycodes

Species
- Saccharomycodes ludwigii; Saccharomycodes sinensis

Genus of fungi

Saccharomycodes is a genus of yeasts. They are helobially reproducing yeasts. The type species is Saccharomycodes ludwigii. The other species, Saccharomycodes sinensis, is known from a single strain that was isolated from soil from a forest on Mount Chienfang on Hainan in China. It is the sister genus of Hanseniaspora.

== Relationships with humans ==
The species Saccharomycodes lugwigii is considered a "spoilage" yeast in the winemaking process and is commonly referred to as the "winemaker's nightmare". It has a high polluting capacity, beginning at one to two cells per liter. It has a high tolerance for sulfur dioxide, high sugar levels, and pressurized carbon dioxide and is difficult to eradicated from an already contaminated environment. It produces high levels of secondary metabolites, including isobutanol, amyl alcohol, and isoamyl alcohol.
