= Polylysine =

ε-Polylysine
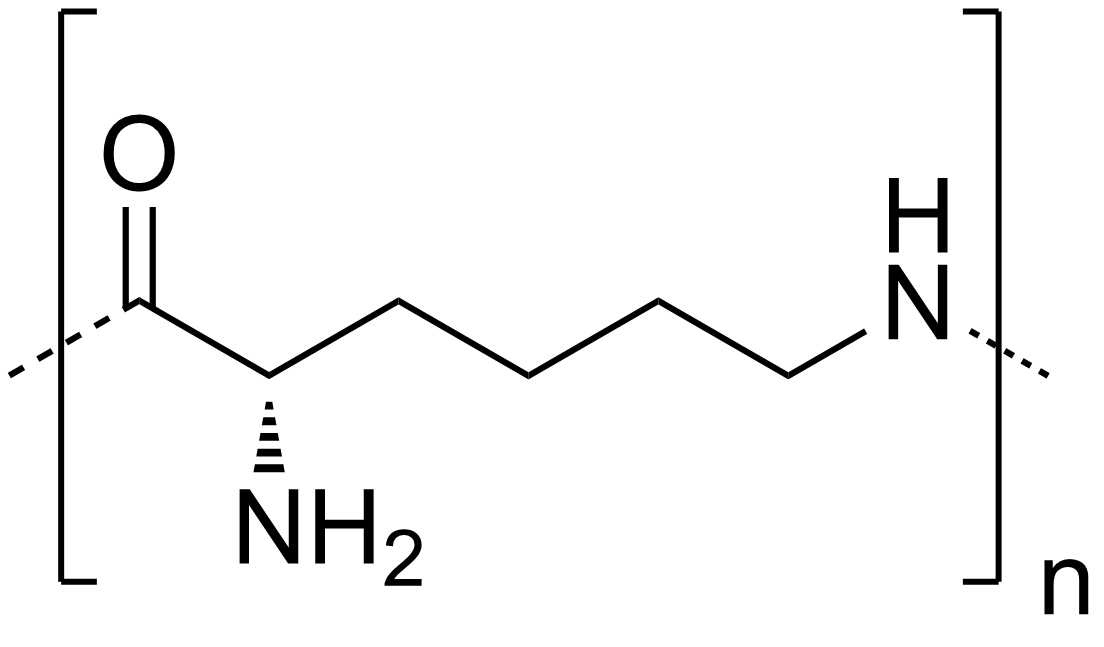
- Skeletal formula of ε-polylysine

Names
- IUPAC name Poly[imino[(2S)-2-amino-1-oxo-1,6-hexanediyl

Identifiers
| CAS Number | 25104-18-1 |
| ChemSpider | none |
| UNII | 0A1V8JTU2M |

Properties
| Chemical formula | (C_{6}H_{12}N_{2}O)_{n} |
| Molar mass | variable 4700 g/mol (degree of polymerization = 30) |
| Melting point | 142.2 °C (288.0 °F; 415.3 K) |
| Solubility in water | Soluble |
| Basicity (pK_{b}) | 5 |
- Except where otherwise noted, data are given for materials in their standard state (at 25 °C [77 °F], 100 kPa). verify (what is ?) Infobox references

Polylysine refers to several types of lysine homopolymers, which may differ from each other in terms of stereochemistry (D/L; the L form is natural and usually assumed) and link position (α/ε). Of these types, only ε-poly-L-lysine is produced naturally.

== Chemical structure ==
The precursor amino acid lysine contains two amino groups, one at the α-carbon and one at the ε-carbon. Either can be the location of polymerization, resulting in α-polylysine or ε-polylysine. Polylysine is a homopolypeptide belonging to the group of cationic polymers: at pH 7, polylysine contains a positively charged hydrophilic amino group.

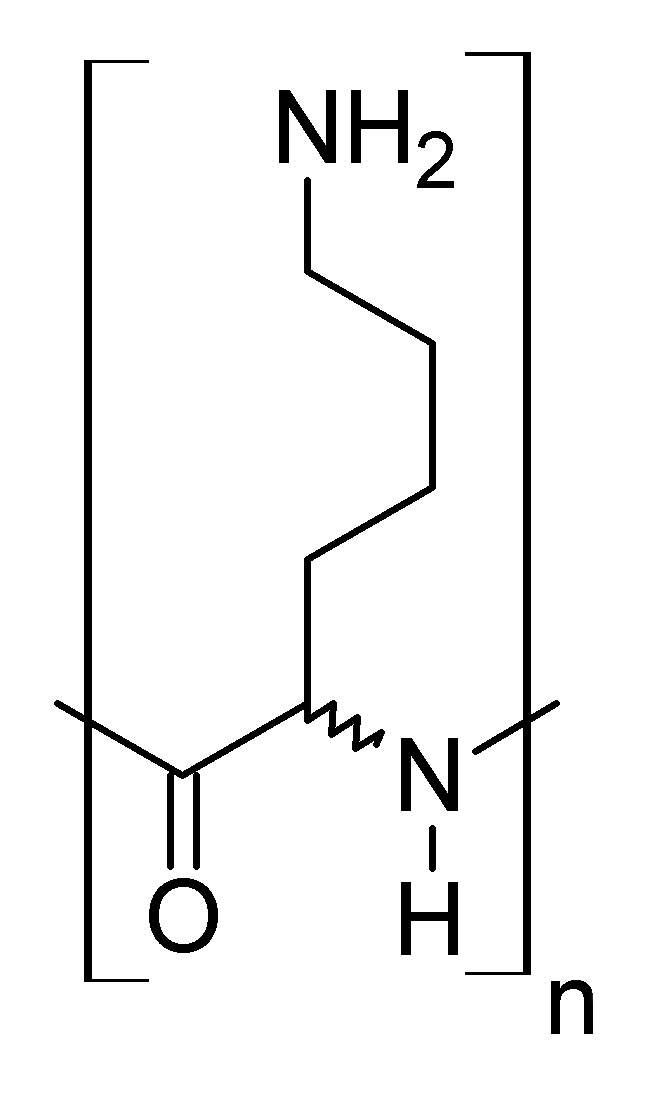
Structure of α-polylysine

α-Polylysine is a synthetic polymer, which can be composed of either L-lysine or D-lysine. "L" and "D" refer to the chirality at lysine's central carbon. This results in poly-L-lysine (PLL) and poly-D-lysine (PDL) respectively.

ε-Polylysine (ε-poly-L-lysine, EPL) is typically produced as a homopolypeptide of approximately 25–30 L-lysine residues. According to research, ε-polylysine is adsorbed electrostatically to the cell surface of the bacteria, followed by a stripping of the outer membrane. This eventually leads to the abnormal distribution of the cytoplasm causing damage to the bacterial cell that is produced by bacterial fermentation. ε-Poly-L-lysine is used as a natural preservative in food products.

List of polylysines
| ! | L | D | Mixed |
|---|---|---|---|
| α | poly-L-lysine (PLL) — coating | poly-D-lysine (PDL) — coating | synthesized, no applications |
| ε | ε-polylysine, EPL — natural antibacterial | unheard of | |
| Mixed | dendric/branched polylysine — studied for RNA delivery | unheard of | |

== Production ==
Production of polylysine by natural fermentation is only observed in strains of bacteria in the genus Streptomyces. Streptomyces albulus is most often used in scientific studies and is also used for the commercial production of ε-polylysine.

α-Polylysine is synthetically produced by a basic polycondensation reaction.

== History ==
The production of ε-polylysine by natural fermentation was first described by researchers Shoji Shima and Heiichi Sakai in 1977. Since the late 1980s, ε-polylysine has been approved by the Japanese Ministry of Health, Labour and Welfare as a preservative in food. In January 2004, ε-polylysine became generally recognized as safe (GRAS) certified in the United States.

== ε-Polylysine ==
=== In food ===
ε-Polylysine is used commercially as a food preservative in Japan, Korea and in imported items sold in the United States. Food products containing polylysine are mainly found in Japan. The use of polylysine is common in food applications such as boiled rice, cooked vegetables, soups, noodles and sliced fish (sushi).

Literature studies have reported an antimicrobial effect of ε-polylysine against yeast, fungi, Gram-positive bacteria and Gram-negative bacteria.

Polylysine has a light yellow appearance and is slightly bitter in taste whether in powder or liquid form.

== α-Polylysine ==
=== In tissue culture ===
α-Polylysine is commonly used to coat tissue cultureware as an attachment factor which improves cell adherence. This phenomenon is based on the interaction between the positively charged polymer and negatively charged cells or proteins. While the poly-L-lysine (PLL) precursor amino acid occurs naturally, the poly-D-lysine (PDL) precursor is an artificial product. The latter is therefore thought to be resistant to enzymatic degradation and so may prolong cell adherence.

== Polylysine in drug delivery ==
Polylysine exhibits high positive charge density which allows it to form soluble complexes with negatively charged macromolecules. Polylysine homopolymers or block copolymers have been widely used for delivery of DNA and proteins. Polylysine-based nanoparticles have also been shown to passively accumulate in the injured sites of blood vessels after stroke due to incorporation into newly formed thrombus, which offers a new way to deliver therapeutic agents specifically to the sites of injury after vascular damage.

== Chemical modification ==
In 2010, hydrophobically modified ε-polylysine was synthesized by reacting EPL with octenyl succinic anhydride (OSA). It was found that OSA-g-EPLs had glass transition temperatures lower than EPL. They were able to form polymer micelles in water and to lower the surface tension of water, confirming their amphiphilic properties. The antimicrobial activities of OSA-g-EPLs were also examined, and the minimum inhibitory concentrations of OSA-g-EPLs against Escherichia coli O157:H7 remained the same as that of EPL. Therefore, modified EPLs have the potential of becoming bifunctional molecules, which can be used either as surfactants or emulsifiers in the encapsulation of water-insoluble drugs or as antimicrobial agents.
