= YMG =

YMG may refer to:

- Young Masters Golf, a Junior Golf Programme
- Young Marble Giants, a Welsh band
- Manitouwadge Airport, IATA code YMG
- The Yngwie Malmsteen Group. 80's Hair Metal Band
- YMG agar, a microbial growth medium containing yeast, malt, and glucose
