= Raffinose—raffinose alpha-galactosyltransferase =

Class of enzymes

raffinose-raffinose alpha-galactotransferase

Identifiers
- EC no.: 2.4.1.166
- CAS no.: 93389-38-9

Databases
- IntEnz: IntEnz view
- BRENDA: BRENDA entry
- ExPASy: NiceZyme view
- KEGG: KEGG entry
- MetaCyc: metabolic pathway
- PRIAM: profile
- PDB structures: RCSB PDB PDBe PDBsum
- Gene Ontology: AmiGO / QuickGO
Search
- PMC: articles
- PubMed: articles
- NCBI: proteins

In enzymology, a raffinose-raffinose alpha-galactosyltransferase (EC 2.4.1.166) is an enzyme that catalyzes the chemical reaction

2 raffinose $\rightleftharpoons$ 1F-alpha-D-galactosylraffinose + sucrose

Hence, this enzyme has one substrate, raffinose, and two products, 1F-alpha-D-galactosylraffinose and sucrose.

This enzyme belongs to the family of glycosyltransferases, to be specific the hexosyltransferases. The systematic name of this enzyme class is raffinose:raffinose alpha-D-galactosyltransferase. Other names in common use include raffinose (raffinose donor) galactosyltransferase, raffinose:raffinose alpha-galactosyltransferase, and raffinose-raffinose alpha-galactotransferase.
