= Starmerella stellata =

Scientific classification
- Kingdom: Fungi
- Division: Ascomycota
- Class: Dipodascomycetes
- Order: Dipodascales
- Family: Trichomonascaceae
- Genus: Starmerella
- Species: S. stellata

Binomial name
- Starmerella stellata (Kroemer & Krumbholz) C.A. Rosa & Lachance, 2018

Species of fungus

Starmerella stellata is a species of yeast of the genus Starmerella. Originally described as Saccharomyces stellatus by Kroemer and Krumbholz in 1931, this yeast was reclassified in 1978 as Candida stellata by Yarrow and Meyer. In 2018, a number of Candida yeasts were transferred to the Starmerella genus, where Candida stellata was reclassified as Starmerella stellata by Rosa & Lachance.

This yeast is present in the fermentation of traditional Italian balsamic vinegar (Zygosaccharomyces rouxii together with Zygosaccharomyces bailii, Z. pseudorouxii, Z. mellis, Z. bisporus, Z. lentus, Hanseniaspora valbyensis, Hanseniaspora osmophila, Candida lactis-condensi, Starmerella stellata, Saccharomycodes ludwigii, Saccharomyces cerevisiae)
