= Cycloheximide chase =

Cycloheximide chase assays are an experimental technique used in molecular and cellular biology to measure steady state protein stability. Cycloheximide is a drug that inhibits the elongation step in eukaryotic protein translation, thereby preventing protein synthesis. The addition of cycloheximide to cultured cells followed by proteolysis at multiple timepoints is conducted to observe protein degradation over time and can be used to determine a protein's half-life. These assays are often followed by western blotting to assess protein abundance and can be analyzed using quantitative tools such as ImageJ.

Implementation

Cycloheximide chase assays have been conducted using a variety of eukaryotic cells such as yeast and mammalian cell lines. Depending on the cell system used for analysis, the assay may vary in application and time course. For example, yeast cells expressing a protein substrate of interest typically require cycloheximide chases lasting up to 90 minutes to allow protein turnover to occur. In contrast, proteins that are expressed in mammalian cell lines tend to me more stable at steady state and may require a chase lasting 3 to 8 hours. Depending on the complexity of the protein and whether it is overexpressed or endogenous to the model system, the required length of the chase may vary. To ensure that protein synthesis is inhibited during the entire chase, cycloheximide is often spiked into the sample every few hours.

In yeast, deletion strains are frequently used to assess protein stability over time with cycloheximide chases. For example, yeast strains lacking critical degradation machinery such as chaperones, E3 ligases, and vacuolar proteins are often used to determine the mechanism of degradation for a protein substrate of interest. Drug treatments (such as MG132) are also used to inhibit steps of degradation, followed by a cycloheximide chase to observe how the stability of a protein of interest is affected. These experiments may be conducted in mammalian cells with the implementation of compatible knockdown procedures in place of the yeast deletion strains.

Cycloheximide chases are also valuable for assessing how different mutations affect the stability of a protein. Experiments have been conducted in yeast and mammalian cells to determine the critical residues required for protein stability and how disease-associated mutations may be affecting protein half-lives within the cell. This information is valuable for understanding the complexities of protein folding and how mutations contribute to the pathogenesis of the diseases they are associated with.

Advantages

There are many benefits to using cycloheximide chase assays as opposed to other methods that assess protein stability. Cycloheximide chases can be used with a wide variety of model systems and can be implemented to study almost any protein substrate. Cycloheximide is relatively inexpensive compound compared to other drugs and it is effective when used in low doses for short periods of time. Pulse chase assays are an alternative method to cycloheximide chase assays and involve the radioactive labeling of newly translated proteins followed by a similar "chase" period. While this method is informative and provides the benefit of observing nascent protein abundance, the radioactive material it requires is expensive with a shorter shelf-life and demands more caution to use than cycloheximide.

Disadvantages

Some disadvantages to conducting cycloheximide chase assays include the toxic nature of cycloheximide. When used at high concentrations over a long period of time, cycloheximide will damage the DNA within the cell and impair critical cellular function. For this reason, cycloheximide chases do not typically last for more than 12 hours. This presents a limitation if the turnover of a particularly stable protein is being studied. Additionally, cycloheximide chases only offer the ability to look at steady state proteins levels as opposed to newly translated protein levels such as with pulse chase. Therefore, only protein degradation and not protein maturation is able to be observed.
