= Saccharomycodes ludwigii =

Scientific classification
- Kingdom: Fungi
- Division: Ascomycota
- Class: Saccharomycetes
- Order: Saccharomycetales
- Family: Saccharomycodaceae
- Genus: Saccharomycodes
- Species: S. ludwigii

Binomial name
- Saccharomycodes ludwigii Hansen, 1904 - Fungi

Synonyms
- Saccharomycodes bispora; Saccharomycodes lipophora; Saccharomycodes vini; Saeenkia bispora

Species of yeast

Saccharomycodes ludwigii is a yeast species best known for being a contaminant in alcohol and fruit juice production. It is highly resistant to typical environmental stressors such as high temperature, high sugar concentration, and high sulfur dioxide concentration. It is often referred to as the "winemaker's nightmare," as it contaminates products by outcompeting desirable yeast species. However, S. ludwigii strains are currently being tested in the growing low-alcohol beer industry.

== Taxonomy ==
Saccharomycodes ludwigii was first classified by Emil Christian Hansen in 1904.

== Description ==
Saccharomycodes ludwigii is characterized by its lemon-like shape during the asexual phases of its life cycle. It appears similar to common brewers' yeast, Saccharomyces cerevisiae, under a microscope. It undergoes division by bud-fission. For sexual reproduction, its ascospores are small and spherical, with asci commonly composed of 1 to 4 ascospores.

== Habitat and ecology ==
Saccharomycodes ludwigii commonly contaminates bottled wines and fruit juices due to the higher sulfur dioxide and sugar concentrations. In these conditions, S. ludwigii is able to out-compete more desirable brewing yeasts and quickly become the dominant species. S. ludwigii is known to inhabit the skins of fruits, making it difficult to avoid contamination.

== Economic uses ==
Saccharomycodes ludwigii has been identified as a species that is suitable for the production of low-alcohol beer products. This is due to the species' inability to ferment maltose, which leads to a lower alcohol content than other traditional yeast species. However, more studies are needed to validate which strain of S. ludwigii is most suitable for the market by accessing the volatile profile of the product which can indicate the flavor quality.

This yeast is also present in the fermentation of traditional Italian balsamic vinegar (Zygosaccharomyces rouxii together with Zygosaccharomyces bailii, Z. pseudorouxii, Z. mellis, Z. bisporus, Z. lentus, Hanseniaspora valbyensis, Hanseniaspora osmophila, Candida lactis-condensi, Candida stellata, Saccharomycodes ludwigii, Saccharomyces cerevisiae)
