= Stachyose =

Names
- IUPAC name β-D-Fructofuranosyl O-α-D-galactopyranosyl-(1→6)-α-D-galactopyranosyl-(1→6)-α-D-glucopyranoside
- Systematic IUPAC name (1^{2}S,1^{3}S,1^{4}S,1^{5}R,3^{2}R,3^{3}R,3^{4}S,3^{5}S,3^{6}R,6^{2}S,6^{3}R,6^{4}S,6^{5}R,6^{6}R,9^{2}S,9^{3}R,9^{4}S,9^{5}R,9^{6}R)-1^{2},1^{5},9^{6}-Tris(hydroxymethyl)-2,5,8-trioxa-3,6(2,6),9(2)-tris(oxana)-1(2)-oxolananonaphane-1^{3},1^{4},3^{3},3^{4},3^{5},6^{3},6^{4},6^{5},9^{3},9^{4},9^{5}-undecol

Identifiers
| CAS Number | 470-55-3 |
| 3D model (JSmol) | Interactive image |
| ChEBI | CHEBI:17164 |
| ChemSpider | 388624 |
| ECHA InfoCard | 100.006.754 |
| EC Number | 207-427-3 |
| PubChem CID | 91455; 439531 |
| UNII | 25VX64653N |
| CompTox Dashboard (EPA) | DTXSID30889345 |
- InChI: InChI=1S/C24H42O21/c25-1-6-10(28)14(32)17(35)21(41-6)39-3-8-11(29)15(33)18(36)22(42-8)40-4-9-12(30)16(34)19(37)23(43-9)45-24(5-27)20(38)13(31)7(2-26)44-24/h6-23,25-38H,1-5H2/t6-,7-,8-,9-,10+,11+,12-,13-,14+,15+,16+,17-,18-,19-,20+,21+,22+,23-,24+/m1/s1 Key: UQZIYBXSHAGNOE-XNSRJBNMSA-N
- SMILES: C([C@@H]1[C@@H]([C@@H]([C@H]([C@H](O1)OC[C@@H]2[C@@H]([C@@H]([C@H]([C@H](O2)OC[C@@H]3[C@H]([C@@H]([C@H]([C@H](O3)O[C@]4([C@H]([C@@H]([C@H](O4)CO)O)O)CO)O)O)O)O)O)O)O)O)O)O

Properties
| Chemical formula | C_{24}H_{42}O_{21} |
| Molar mass | 666.578 g/mol |
- Except where otherwise noted, data are given for materials in their standard state (at 25 °C [77 °F], 100 kPa). Infobox references

Stachyose is a tetrasaccharide consisting of two α-D-galactose units, one α-D-glucose unit, and one β-D-fructose unit sequentially linked as Gal(α1→6)Gal(α1→6)Glc(α1↔2β)Fruf. Together with related oligosaccharides such as raffinose, stachyose occurs naturally in numerous vegetables (e.g. green beans, soybeans and other beans) and other plants.

Stachyose is less sweet than sucrose, at about 28% on a weight basis. It is mainly used as a bulk sweetener or for its functional oligosaccharide properties. Stachyose is not completely digestible by humans and delivers 1.5 to 2.4 kcal/g (6 to 10 kJ/g).

== Biosynthesis ==
In plants such as Vicia faba, stachyose is biosynthesized from the trisaccharide, raffinose, by the enzyme galactinol-raffinose galactosyltransferase. This uses galactinol as the source of the galactose unit, with inositol (myo-inositol) as a byproduct.

galactinol
+
raffinose
inositol
+
stachyose
