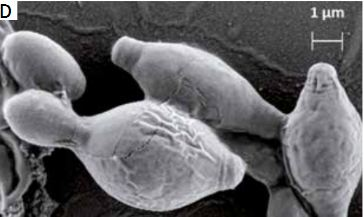
- Hanseniaspora uvarum

Scientific classification
- Kingdom: Fungi
- Division: Ascomycota
- Class: Saccharomycetes
- Order: Saccharomycetales
- Family: Saccharomycodaceae
- Genus: Hanseniaspora; Zikes ex Klöcker (1912)

Type species
- Hanseniaspora valbyensis Klöcker (1912)

Species
- See text

Synonyms
- List: Carpozyma L.Engel (1872); Hansenia Lindner (1905); Hansenia Zikes (1911); Hanseniaspora Zikes (1911); Kloeckeraspora Niehaus (1932); Thelis Clem. (1931); Vanderwaltia E.K.Novák & Zsolt (1961)

= Hanseniaspora =

Genus of fungi

Hanseniaspora is a genus of yeasts. The name Kloeckera is applied to its anamorph form. They are typically apiculate (lemon-shaped) in shape and often found in grape musts pre-fermentation.

The genus name Hanseniaspora honours Emil Christian Hansen (1842–1909), who was a Danish mycologist and fermentation physiologist. It was initially circumscribed by H. Zikes in 1911, but not validly published. Albert Klöcker published the name validly the following year.

The genus is notable for its loss of many highly conserved genes responsible for cell cycle regulation and genome integrity, resulting in increased evolution rates and genome size reduction. It can be divided into two lineages: a faster-evolving lineage (FEL) diversifying about 87 mya, and a slower one diversifying about 52 mya. The FEL has more of such gene losses, resulting in more dramatic changes in the genome and inactivation of multiple metabolic pathways. However, it has managed to diversify and thrive, showing that life can function without such regulation.

== Role in Fermentation ==
Due to their natural prevalence and resistance to osmotic pressure, several genera of Hanseniaspora, particularly H. vinae and H. oenarum, are significant contributors to early wine fermentation. However, as fermentation progresses and ethanol increases, Hanseniaspora is outcompeted, although H. osmophila is tolerable to ethanol concentrations of up to 11%. The use of H. vinae in wine fermentations has significant effects on end-product flavors. Compared to S. cerevisiae, H. vinae produces more monoterpenes, sesquiterpenes, and acetoin. The primary olfactory contribution is 2-phenylethyl acetate, characterized by a floral (roses), honey scent. In addition, H. vinae fermentation is marked by lower higher alcohols, ethyl esters, and medium chain fatty acids. It has been observed that co-inoculations with L. thermotolerans/H. vineae showed inhibition of acidification, generating up to 0.41 g/L of lactic acid. In contrast, a synergistic effect was observed when L. thermotolerans/H. opuntiae was used, reaching 2.44 g/L of lactic acid and a pH reduction of up to 0.16.

== Species ==
- Hanseniaspora clermontiae Čadež et al. (2003)
- Hanseniaspora gamundiae Libkind, Čadež & Hittinger (2019)
- Hanseniaspora guilliermondii Pijper (1928)
- Hanseniaspora lachancei Čadež et al. (2003)
- Hanseniaspora lindneri (Klöcker) Čadež & Libkind (2019)
- Hanseniaspora meyeri Čadež et al. (2003)
- Hanseniaspora mollemarum M. Groenew., G. Péter, S.A. James, Dlauchy & M.T. Sm. (2018)
- Hanseniaspora nectarophila Čadež, Pagnocca, Raspor & C.A. Rosa (2014)
- Hanseniaspora occidentalis M.T.Smith (1974)
- Hanseniaspora opuntiae Čadež et al. (2003)
- Hanseniaspora osmophila (Niehaus) Phaff et al. (1956)
- Hanseniaspora pseudoguilliermondii Čadež et al. (2006)
- Hanseniaspora smithiae Libkind, Čadež & Hittinger (2021)
- Hanseniaspora uvarum (Niehaus) Shehata et al. (1984)
- Hanseniaspora valbyensis Klöcker (1912)
- Hanseniaspora vineae van der Walt & Tscheuschner (1957)

== See also ==
- Yeast in winemaking
