= Streptomyces albulus =

Scientific classification
- Domain: Bacteria
- Kingdom: Bacillati
- Phylum: Actinomycetota
- Class: Actinomycetes
- Order: Streptomycetales
- Family: Streptomycetaceae
- Genus: Streptomyces
- Species: S. albulus

Binomial name
- Streptomyces albulus Routien 1969 (Approved Lists 1980)

Type strain
- AS 4.1585, ATCC 12757, BA 4105, BCRC 11819, CBS 711.72, CCRC 11819, CGMCC 4.1585, DSM 40492, IFO 13410, ISP 5492, JCM 4718, KCC S-0718, KCTC 9668, MTCC 503, NBRC 13410, NRRL B-5386, NRRL-ISP 5492, RIA 1371

Species of bacterium

Streptomyces albulus is a bacterium species from the genus of Streptomyces. Streptomyces albulus produces acetoxycycloheximide, aciphenol, albanoursin and cycloheximide.

== See also ==
- List of Streptomyces species
