= Hanseniaspora guilliermondii =

Scientific classification
- Kingdom: Fungi
- Division: Ascomycota
- Class: Saccharomycetes
- Order: Saccharomycetales
- Family: Saccharomycodaceae
- Genus: Hanseniaspora
- Species: H. guilliermondii

Binomial name
- Hanseniaspora guilliermondii Pijper (1928)

Synonyms
- Willia guilliermondii (Pijper) Vuillemin 1931; Hanseniaspora melligeri Lodder 1932; Hanseniaspora apulienis Castelli 1948; Acaromyces laviae Lavie 1950; Kloeckera apiculata (Reess) Janke var. apis Lavie 1954; Kloeckera apis Lavie ex M.Th. Smith, Simione & S.A. Meyer 1977

Species of yeast

Hanseniaspora guilliermondii is a species of yeast in the family Saccharomycetaceae. In its anamorph form, it is called Kloeckera apis.

== Taxonomy ==
The initial sample of the species was isolated by South African pathologist Adrianus Pijper from an infected nail from a patient and assigned the name H. guilliermondii. In 1952, the species was placed in synonymy with Hanseniaspora valbyensis. In 1968, N. J. W. Kerger-Van Rij and Donald G. Ahearn, observed physiological and morphological differences between H. valbyensis and H. guilliermondii and proposed a resumed separation of the two species. Their study identified that a third strain, originally described as H. melligeri by J. Lodder in 1932 that had been isolated from dates and later synonymized with H. valbyensis, was synonymous with H. guilliermondii. Further testing by Meyer, Brown, and Smith in 1977 confirmed the findings of the 1968 study using DNA testing. Further DNA examination in 1978 demonstrated that yeast samples originally collected from grape juice and identified as the unique species H. apuliensis by Castelli in 1948, later synonymized with H. valbyensis in 1958, was actually synonymous with H. guilliermondii. Yeast samples that had been obtained from a bee by P. Lavie in 1954 and later designated as Kloeckera apis was found to be the anamorph form of H. guilliermondii and placed in synonymy.

== Description ==
Microscopic examination of the yeast cells in YM liquid medium after 48 hours at 25°C reveals cells that are 2.2 to 5.8 μm by 4.5 to 10.2 μm in size or occasionally longer, apiculate, ovoid to elongate, appearing singly or in pairs. Reproduction is by budding, which occurs at both poles of the cell. In broth culture, sediment is present, and after one month a very thin ring is formed.

Colonies that are grown on malt agar for one month at 25°C appear white to cream-colored, glossy, and smooth. Growth is slightly raised at the center. The yeast forms poorly-developed pseudohyphae on potato agar, or are absent. The yeast has been observed to form one to four, mostly four, hat-shaped ascospores when grown for at least one week on 5% Difco malt extract agar or on potato dextrose agar. When released, the ascospores tend to clump together.

The yeast can ferment glucose, but not galactose, sucrose, maltose, lactose, raffinose or trehalose. It has a positive growth rate at 37°C, but no growth at 40°C. It can grow on agar media containing 0.1% cycloheximide and utilize 2-keto-d-gluconate as a sole source of carbon.

== Ecology ==
Although the original sample of the species was obtained in a clinical medical setting, the yeast is primarily associated with fruits, plants, fermenting musts, and insects. Strains of this species produce acetoin, a chemical found in many food products and fragrances.
