= Killer toxin Kp4 family =

Kp4
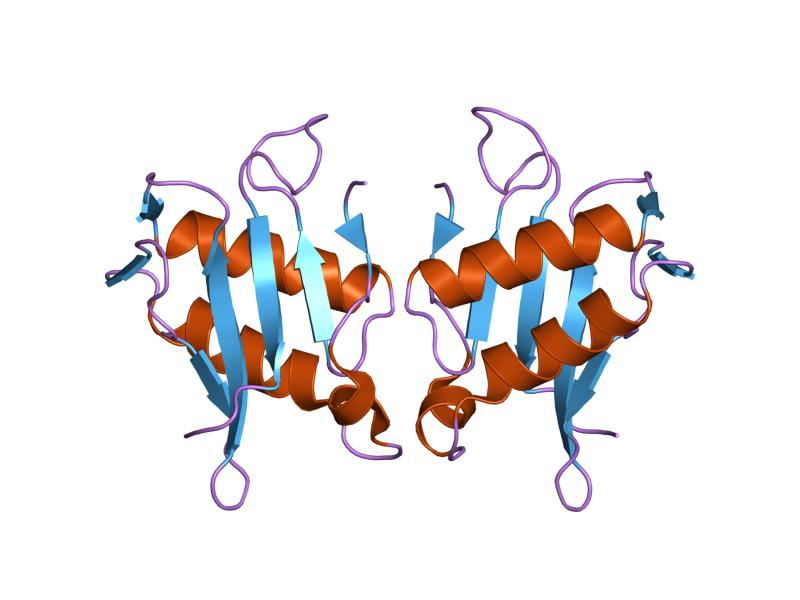
- structure and function of a virally encoded fungal toxin from ustilago maydis: a fungal and mammalian calcium channel inhibitor

Identifiers
- Symbol: Kp4
- Pfam: PF09044
- InterPro: IPR015131
Available protein structures:
- PDB: IPR015131 PF09044 (ECOD; PDBsum)
- AlphaFold: IPR015131; PF09044

In molecular biology, the killer toxin Kp4 family is a family of killer toxins, which includes the Kp4 killer toxin from the smut fungus Ustilago maydis.

Killer toxins are polypeptides secreted by some fungal species ("killer yeasts") that kill sensitive cells of the same or related species, often functioning by creating pores in target cell membranes. The fungal killer toxin KP4 from the corn smut fungus, Ustilago maydis (Smut fungus), is encoded by a resident symbiotic double-stranded RNA virus, Ustilago maydis P4 virus (UmV4), within fungal cells. Unlike most killer toxins, KP4 is a single polypeptide. KP4 inhibits voltage-gated calcium channels in mammalian cells, which in turn inhibits cell growth and division by blocking calcium import. KP4 adopts a structure consisting of a two-layer alpha/beta sandwich with a left-handed crossover.
