= Tetrasaccharide =

Polysaccharide with four sugar units

Chemical structure of stachyose

A tetrasaccharide is a carbohydrate which gives upon hydrolysis four molecules of the same or different monosaccharides. For example, stachyose upon hydrolysis gives one molecule each of glucose and fructose and two molecules of galactose. The general formula of a tetrasaccharide is typically C_{24}H_{42}O_{21}.

Structure and occurrence of tetrasaccharides
Name	chemical compound	function/occur
Lychnose (1-α-Galactosyl-raffinose)	O-α-D-Galp-(1→6)-O-α-D-Glup-(1→2)-O-β-D-Fruf-(1→1)-O-α-D-Galp	
Maltotetraose	O-α-D-Glcp-(1→4)-O-α-D-Glcp-(1→4)-O-α-D-Glcp-(1→4)-D-Glcp	in Starchsyrup
Nigerotetraose	O-α-D-Glcp-(1→3)-O-α-D-Glcp-(1→3)-O-α-D-Glcp-(1→3)-D-Glcp	
Nystose (β-D-Fructosyl-1-kestose)	O-α-D-Glcp-(1→2)-β-D-Fruf-(1→2)-β-D-Fruf-(1→2)-β-D-Fruf	
Sesamose	O-α-D-Galp-(1→6)-O-α-D-Galp-(1→6)-O-β-D-Fruf-(2→1)-O-α-D-Glcp	
Stachyose	O-α-D-Galp-(1→6)-O-α-D-Galp-(1→6)-O-α-D-Glcp-(1→2)-β-D-Fruf	widespread in plants (artichoke, soybean)

In addition to free tetrasaccharides, the term tetrasaccharide is often used to describe subunits or bioconjugates. Thus, tetrasaccharide groups appended to red blood cells are responsible for blood types. A repeating modified tetrasaccharide (gal-gal-gal-raf) comprises gellan.
