= Emil Christian Hansen =

Danish mycologist

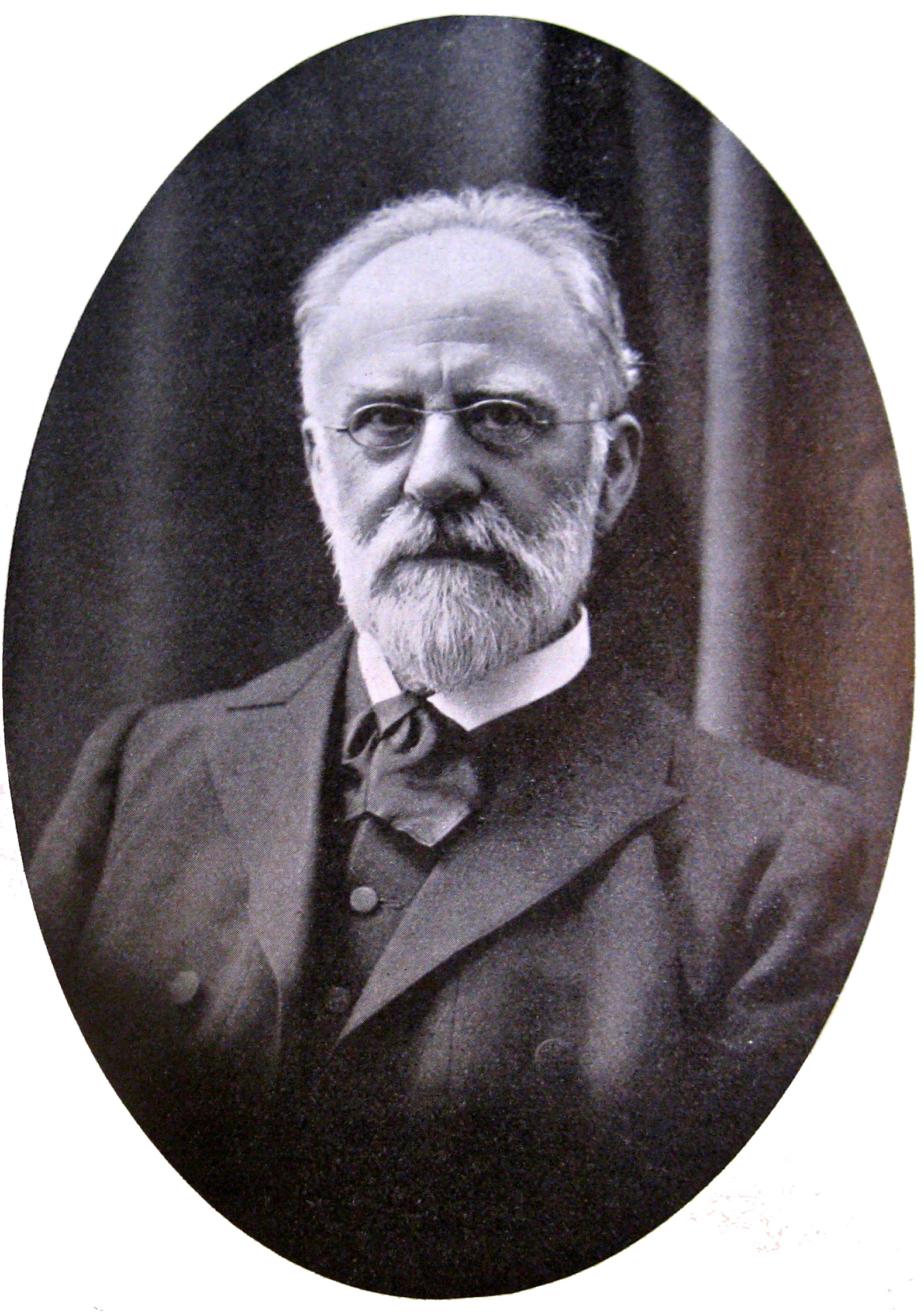
- Emil Christian Hansen
- Born: 8 May 1842; Ribe
- Died: 27 August 1909 (aged 67)
- Known for: Saccharomyces carlsbergensis
- Scientific career
- Fields: Mycology
- Workplaces: Carlsberg Laboratory
- Author abbrev. (botany): E.C.Hansen

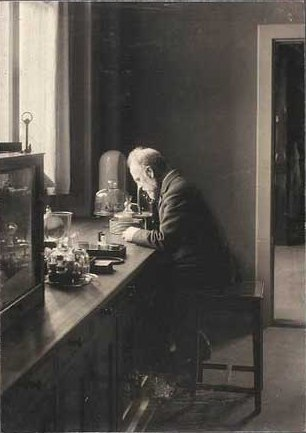
Hansen in his lab.

Emil Christian Hansen (8 May 1842 – 27 August 1909) was a Danish mycologist and fermentation physiologist.

== Early life and education ==
Hansen was born in Ribe to Joseph Christian Hansen, a house-painter, and his wife Ane Catherina Dyhre.

Between 1874 and 1875 he edited and distributed an mycological exsiccata work, namely Fungorum fimicolorum exempl. exsiccati, with 350 numbered specimen units. He was awarded a gold medal in 1876 for an essay on fungi, titled De danske Gjødningssvampe. During his days as a university student in Copenhagen, he worked as an unpaid assistant to zoologist Japetus Steenstrup (1813–1897).

== Career ==
In 1876, with Alfred Jørgensen (1848–1925), he published a Danish translation of Charles Darwin’s "The Voyage of the Beagle"; Rejse om Jorden. From 1879 to 1909, he was director of the physiological department at Carlsberg Laboratory.

Hired by the Carlsberg Laboratory in Copenhagen in 1879, he became the first to isolate a pure cell of yeast in 1883, and after combining it with a sugary solution, produced more yeast than was in a yeast bank. It was named as Saccharomyces carlsbergensis after the laboratory, and is the yeast from which are derived, all yeasts used in lager beers. See Fermentation, Yeast.

Hansen is the taxonomic authority of the fungal genus Anixiopsis (1897) from the family Onygenaceae.

He was honoured in 1911, when botanist H. Zikes published Hanseniaspora, which is a genus of yeasts.

== Publications by Hansen that have been translated into English ==
- Practical studies in fermentation: being contributions to the life history of micro-organisms, 1896.
- Considerations on Technical Mycology, 1905.

== Literature ==
- Claussen, Niels Hjelte Emil Christian Hansen, pp. 161–164 in: Meisen, V. Prominent Danish Scientists through the Ages. University Library of Copenhagen 450th Anniversary. Levin & Munksgaard, Copenhagen (1932)
- Beer in Health and Disease Prevention edited by Victor R. Preedy
