= Acetoxycycloheximide =

Names
- IUPAC name (1R,3S,5S)-3-[(1R)-2-(2,6-Dioxo-4-piperidinyl)-1-hydroxyethyl]-1,5-dimethyl-4-oxocyclohexyl acetate
- Other names Acetyloxycycloheximide; E-73

Identifiers
CAS Number	2885-39-4
3D model (JSmol)	Interactive image
ChemSpider	66113
PubChem CID	73396
UNII	UX3Y1I395S
CompTox Dashboard (EPA)	DTXSID001028172
- InChI: InChI=1S/C17H25NO6/c1-9-7-17(3,24-10(2)19)8-12(16(9)23)13(20)4-11-5-14(21)18-15(22)6-11/h9,11-13,20H,4-8H2,1-3H3,(H,18,21,22)/t9-,12-,13+,17+/m0/s1 Key: UFDHNJJHPSGMFX-SQUSCZTCSA-N
- SMILES: C[C@H]1C[C@@](C[C@H](C1=O)[C@@H](CC2CC(=O)NC(=O)C2)O)(C)OC(=O)C

Properties
Chemical formula	C_{17}H_{25}NO_{6}
Molar mass	339.388 g·mol^{−1}
- Except where otherwise noted, data are given for materials in their standard state (at 25 °C [77 °F], 100 kPa). Infobox references

Acetoxycycloheximide is an organic chemical compound. It can be considered as the acetylated analogue of cycloheximide. It is a potent protein synthesis inhibitor in animal cells and can inhibit the formation of memories.

== See also ==
- Cycloheximide
