= Albert Klöcker =

Danish mycologist

- Born: 28 June 1862; Copenhagen, Denmark
- Died: 3 October 1923 (aged 61)
- Known for: Studies of yeast
- Scientific career
- Fields: Mycology
- Workplaces: Carlsberg Laboratory

Albert Klöcker (28 June 1862 – 3 October 1923) was a Danish mycologist and fermentation physiologist.

Born in Copenhagen, he completed grammar school and began studying medicine. He switched his studies to pharmacy and graduated in 1888. After working as a pharmacist in Copenhagen, he was hired in 1892 as an assistant at the Carlsberg Laboratory's Physiological department, under Emil Christian Hansen. He worked for the laboratory a total of 31 years until his death in 1923. After Hansen's death in 1909, Klöcker was made Director Extraordinary in the same department.

Klöcker's main studies focused on the field of yeast physiology, but he also studied botany and zoology, particularly the study of entomology. He described a number of new species and genera of yeast in the Saccharomycetes family as well as new species of Penicillium and Endomyces. He developed techniques for the description of yeasts based upon the sugars they are able to metabolize.

Between 1894 and 1911 he was an editor for the Archiv for Pharmaci og Chemi. From 1903 to 1913, he was the editor of the Danish journal Entomolgiske Meddelelser, and from 1909 to his death he edited the periodical Bryggeritidende (Journal of Brewing). After 1913, he was a co-editor of the journal Zentralblatt für Bakteriologie. Drawing upon his studies in entomology, he wrote the volumes on butterflies and moths in Danmarks Fauna. He became widely known after the publication of his book Fermentation organisms, which appeared in many editions and in several languages.

Klöcker died in on October 3, 1923, after a short illness, leaving a wife and two daughters.
