= Trisaccharide =

Class of carbohydrate

Trisaccharides are oligosaccharides composed of three monosaccharides with two glycosidic bonds connecting them. Similar to the disaccharides, each glycosidic bond can be formed between any hydroxyl group on the component monosaccharides. Even if all three component sugars are the same (e.g., glucose), different bond combinations (regiochemistry) and stereochemistry (alpha- or beta-) result in trisaccharides that are diastereoisomers with different chemical and physical properties.

== Examples ==
Trisaccharide	Unit 1	Bond	Unit 2	Bond	Unit 3
Nigerotriose	glucose	α(1→3)	glucose	α(1→3)	glucose
Maltotriose	glucose	α(1→4)	glucose	α(1→4)	glucose
Melezitose	glucose	α(1→2)	fructose	α(1→3)	glucose
Maltotriulose	glucose	α(1→4)	glucose	α(1→4)	fructose
Raffinose	galactose	α(1→6)	glucose	β(1→2)	fructose
Kestose	glucose	α(1↔2)	fructose	β(1←2)	fructose
