= Assimilation (biology) =

Biological processes to supply organisms and cells with organic and inorganic nutrients

In biology, assimilation is a crucial metabolic process in which absorbed nutrients are transformed into complex biomolecules, that become an integral part of an organism's cellular structure and function. It occurs after digestion and absorption, ensuring that essential macromolecules—such as carbohydrates, proteins, and lipids—are synthesized and utilized for growth, repair, energy,and maintenance of bodily functions.

For instance, monosaccharides like glucose, derived from carbohydrate digestion, enter cells via facilitated diffusion or active transport. Once inside, glucose undergoes glycolysis, the Krebs cycle, and oxidative phosphorylation to generate ATP, which fuels cellular activities. Similarly, amino acids absorbed from dietary proteins are assimilated into cells and serve as precursors for protein synthesis, supporting enzymatic reactions, muscle development, and tissue repair. Fatty acids and glycerol, obtained from lipid digestion, are reassembled into triglycerides and stored in adipose tissue or utilized in membrane synthesis and energy production.

In plants, assimilation primarily involves the conversion of inorganic carbon (CO_{2}) into organic compounds via photosynthesis. Through the Calvin cycle, CO_{2} is fixed into glucose, which serves as a fundamental energy source and structural component in cellular processes. Additionally, nitrogen assimilation enables plants to incorporate inorganic nitrogen (from nitrates or ammonium) into amino acids and nucleotides, essential for protein and DNA synthesis.

Overall, assimilation is a fundamental process that integrates absorbed nutrients into the biochemical pathways of an organism, ensuring proper growth, energy production, and homeostasis.

== Examples of biological assimilation ==
- Photosynthesis, a process whereby carbon dioxide and water are transformed into a number of organic molecules in plant cells.
- Nitrogen fixation from the soil into organic molecules by symbiotic bacteria which live in the roots of certain plants, such as Leguminosae.
- The absorption of nutrients into the body after digestion in the intestine and its transformation in biological tissues and fluids.

== See also ==
- Anabolism
- Biochemistry
- Nutrition
- Respiration
- Transportation
- Excretion
