= Raffinose =

Chemical compound

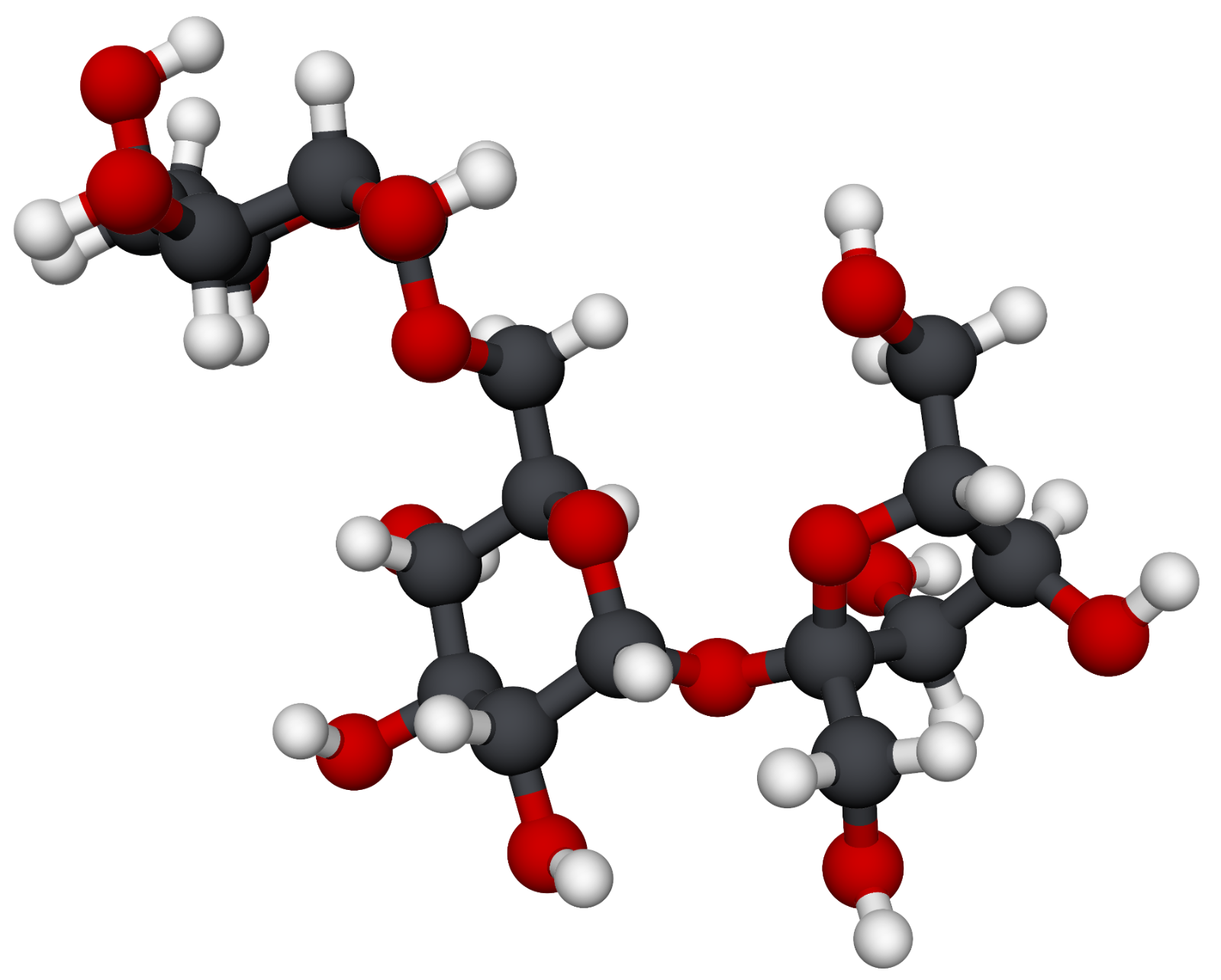

Names
- IUPAC name β-D-Fructofuranosyl α-D-galactopyranosyl-(1→6)-α-D-glucopyranoside
- Systematic IUPAC name (2R,3R,4S,5S,6R)-2-{[(2S,3S,4S,5R)-3,4-Dihydroxy-2,5-bis(hydroxymethyl)oxolan-2-yl]oxy}-6-({[(2S,3R,4S,5R,6R)-3,4,5-trihydroxy-6-(hydroxymethyl)oxan-2-yl]oxy}methyl)oxane-3,4,5-triol
- Other names rafinosa D-(+)-Raffinose; D-Raffinose; D-raffinose pentahydrate Gossypose; Melitose; Melitriose; NSC 170228; NSC 2025; 6G-α-D-galactosylsucrose; β-D-fructofuranosyl-O-α-D-glucopyranosyl-(1→6)-α-D-galactopyranoside hydrate(1:5)

Identifiers
CAS Number	512-69-6; (pentahydrate): 17629-30-0
3D model (JSmol)	Interactive image
ChEBI	CHEBI:16634
ChEMBL	ChEMBL603717
ChemSpider	388379
ECHA InfoCard	100.007.407
EC Number	208-146-9; (pentahydrate): 605-771-2
KEGG	C00492
PubChem CID	439242
UNII	N5O3QU595M
CompTox Dashboard (EPA)	DTXSID8041111
- InChI: InChI=1S/C18H32O16/c19-1-5-8(22)11(25)13(27)16(31-5)30-3-7-9(23)12(26)14(28)17(32-7)34-18(4-21)15(29)10(24)6(2-20)33-18/h5-17,19-29H,1-4H2/t5-,6-,7-,8+,9-,10-,11+,12+,13-,14-,15+,16+,17-,18+/m1/s1 Key: MUPFEKGTMRGPLJ-ZQSKZDJDSA-N
- SMILES: C([C@@H]1[C@@H]([C@@H]([C@H]([C@H](O1)OC[C@@H]2[C@H]([C@@H]([C@H]([C@H](O2)O[C@]3([C@H]([C@@H]([C@H](O3)CO)O)O)CO)O)O)O)O)O)O)O

Properties
Chemical formula	C_{18}H_{32}O_{16}
Molar mass	594.5 g/mol (pentahydrate)
Melting point	118 °C
Solubility in water	203 g/L
- Except where otherwise noted, data are given for materials in their standard state (at 25 °C [77 °F], 100 kPa). Infobox references

Raffinose is a trisaccharide derived from galactose, glucose, and fructose. Raffinose can be hydrolyzed to D-galactose and sucrose by the enzyme alpha galactosidase (α-GAL), an enzyme synthesized by bacteria found in the large intestine. α-GAL also hydrolyzes other alpha galactosides such as stachyose, verbascose, and galactinol, if present. In plants, raffinose plays a significant role in stress responses, particularly temperature sensitivity, seed vigour, resistance to pathogens, and desiccation. It can be found in beans, cabbage, Brussels sprouts, broccoli, asparagus, other vegetables, and whole grains.

== Chemical properties ==
The raffinose family of oligosaccharides (RFOs) are α-galactosyl derivatives of sucrose, the most common being the trisaccharide raffinose, the tetrasaccharide stachyose, and the pentasaccharide verbascose. RFOs are almost ubiquitous across the plant kingdom, being found in a large variety of seeds from many different families. They rank second only to sucrose in abundance as soluble carbohydrates.

Raffinose typically crystallises as a pentahydrate white crystalline powder. It is odorless and has a sweet taste approximately 10% that of sucrose.

== Biosynthesis and metabolism ==
In plants such as Vicia faba the enzyme galactinol-sucrose galactosyltransferase produces raffinose from galactinol (α-D-galactosyl-(1->3)-1D-myo-inositol) and sucrose. The galactose sugar part of galactinol is transferred to the primary alcohol in the glucopyranose ring of the sucrose, forming the trisaccharide, with inositol as a byproduct.

galactinol
+
sucrose
inositol
+
raffinose

Raffinose can then react with a second molecule of galactinol, catalysed by galactinol-raffinose galactosyltransferase to form the tetrasaccharide, stachyose:

galactinol + raffinose
inositol +
stachyose

Inositol is again formed as a byproduct.

== Biochemical properties ==
=== Energy source ===
It is non-digestible in humans and other monogastric animals (pigs and poultry) who do not possess the α-GAL enzyme to break down RFOs. These oligosaccharides pass undigested through the stomach and small intestine. In the large intestine, they are fermented by bacteria that do possess the α-GAL enzyme and make short-chain fatty acids (SCFA)(acetic, propionic, butyric acids), as well as the flatulence commonly associated with eating beans and other vegetables. These SCFAs have been recently claimed to impart a number of health benefits. α-GAL is present in digestive aids such as the product Beano.

=== Plant health ===
Cases of abiotic stress such as temperature, drought, and salinity have shown to increase RFO levels, especially raffinose, in plants. The functional role raffinose plays in abiotic stress tolerance is not well known, but its presence as a positive regulator of these stresses is established.

Galactinol synthase (GolS) is an enzyme key in the synthesis of RFOs. Studies which modify the expression of GolS have been done to understand the role of RFOs in stress response. GolS has been found to induce salicylic acid signalling pathways and expression of defence-related genes, showing RFOs to have a role in pathogen resistance.

RFOs have been seen to assist in seed germination. They are used as a source of energy and carbon for germination, and protect the seed from desiccation during the maturation process. One proposed mechanism of RFOs working against desiccation details the hydroxyl groups replacing water to maintain hydrophilicity ion the cell, which stabilizes the membrane structure and macromolecules needed for cellular function. Another mechanism, called "vitrification", has the cell taking on a highly viscous form, like that of a plastic solid. This maintains cellular stability and hydrogen bonding in the cell, and prevents cellular collapse.

In many plants, RFOs have been seen to act as an alternative to sucrose for sugar storage and transport.

== Disease relevance ==
Research has shown that the differential ability to utilize raffinose by strains of the bacteria Streptococcus pneumoniae impacts their ability to cause disease and the nature of the disease.

== Uses ==
Procedures concerning cryopreservation have used raffinose to provide hypertonicity for cell desiccation prior to freezing. Either raffinose or sucrose is used as a base substance for sucralose.

Raffinose is also used in:

- skin moisturizers and cosmetics
- prebiotics (it promotes growth of lactobacilli and bifidobacteria)
- food or drinks additive
- chiral stationary phase in HPLC

== See also ==
- Raffinose—raffinose alpha-galactosyltransferase
- Raphanin
