= Cellobiose =

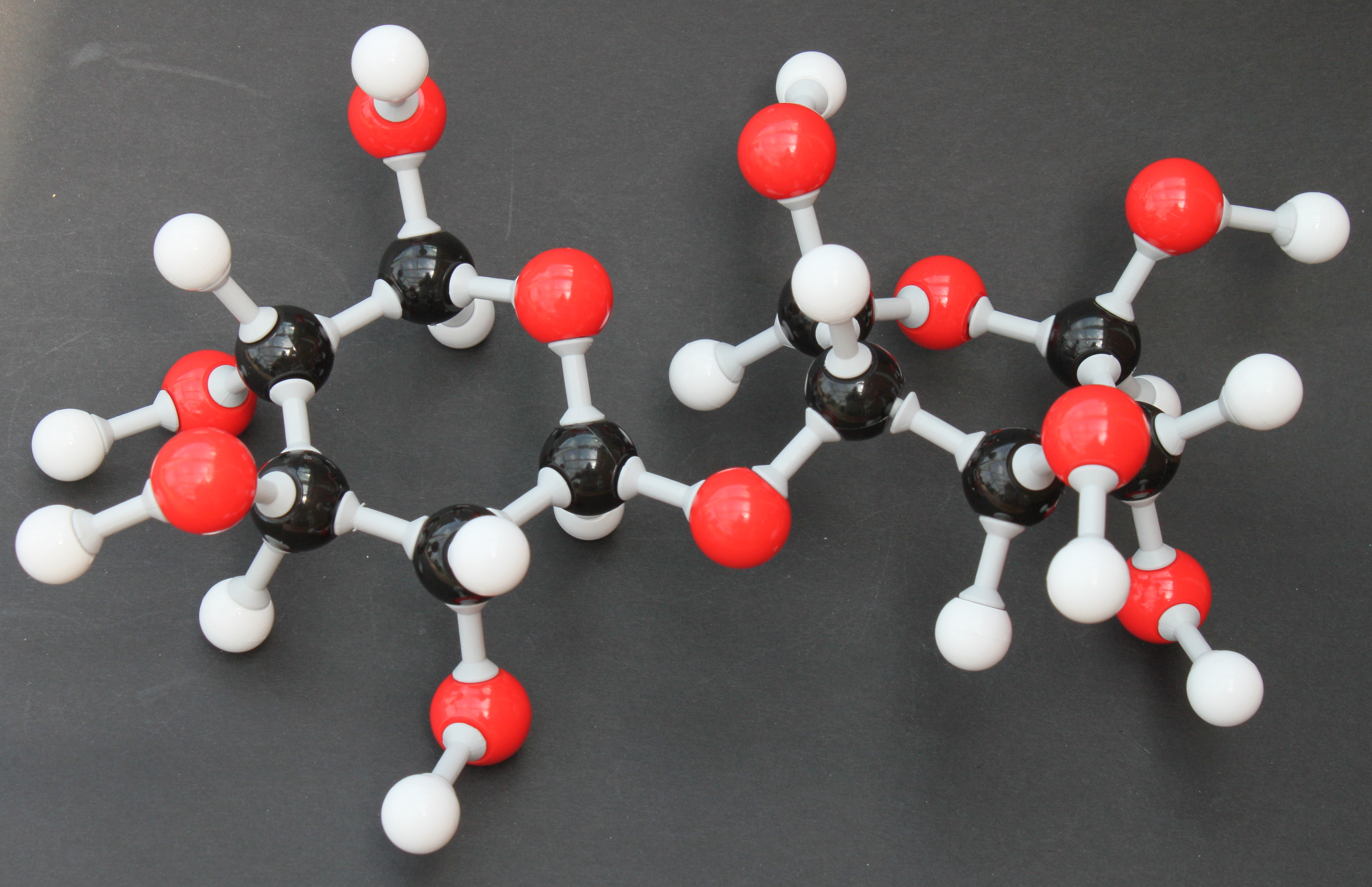

Names
- IUPAC names β-D-glucopyranosyl-(1→4)-D-glucopyranose; 4-O-β-D-Glucopyranosyl-D-glucopyranose
- Systematic IUPAC name (2Ξ,3R,4R,5S,6R)-6-(Hydroxymethyl)-5-{[(2S,3R,4S,5S,6R)-3,4,5-trihydroxy-6-(hydroxymethyl)oxan-2-yl]oxy}oxane-2,3,4-triol

Identifiers
CAS Number	528-50-7
3D model (JSmol)	Interactive image
ChEBI	CHEBI:17057
ChEMBL	ChEMBL1614877
ChemSpider	10261
DrugBank	DB02061
ECHA InfoCard	100.007.670
KEGG	C00185
PubChem CID	294; 439178
UNII	BM3MOX055H
CompTox Dashboard (EPA)	DTXSID001015527 DTXSID3045984, DTXSID001015527
- InChI: InChI=1S/C12H22O11/c13-1-3-5(15)6(16)9(19)12(22-3)23-10-4(2-14)21-11(20)8(18)7(10)17/h3-20H,1-2H2/t3-,4-,5-,6+,7-,8-,9-,10-,11?,12+/m1/s1 Key: GUBGYTABKSRVRQ-CUHNMECISA-N
- SMILES: O[C@H]2[C@H](O[C@@H]1O[C@H](CO)[C@@H](O)[C@H](O)[C@H]1O)[C@H](OC(O)[C@@H]2O)CO

Properties
Chemical formula	C_{12}H_{22}O_{11}
Molar mass	342.297 g·mol^{−1}
Appearance	White, hard powder
Odor	Odorless
Density	1.768 g/mL
Melting point	203.5 °C (398.3 °F; 476.6 K) (decomposes)
Solubility in water	12 g/100 mL
Solubility	Very slightly soluble in alcohol insoluble in ether, chloroform
log P	−5.03
Acidity (pK_{a})	12.39

Hazards
NFPA 704 (fire diamond)	1 0 0
Safety data sheet (SDS)	Sigma-Aldrich
- Except where otherwise noted, data are given for materials in their standard state (at 25 °C [77 °F], 100 kPa). verify (what is ?) Infobox references

Cellobiose is a disaccharide with the formula (C_{6}H_{7}(OH)_{4}O)_{2}O. It is classified as a reducing sugar - any sugar that possesses the ability or function of a reducing agent. The chemical structure of cellobiose is derived from the condensation of a pair of glucose molecules forming a β(1→4) bond. It can be hydrolyzed to glucose enzymatically or with acid. Cellobiose has eight free alcohol (OH) groups, one acetal linkage, and one hemiacetal linkage, which give rise to strong inter- and intramolecular hydrogen bonds. It is a white solid.

It can be obtained by enzymatic or acidic hydrolysis of cellulose and cellulose-rich materials such as cotton, jute, or paper. Cellobiose can be used as an indicator carbohydrate for Crohn's disease and malabsorption syndrome.

Treatment of cellulose with acetic anhydride and sulfuric acid gives cellobiose octaacetate, of which there is no longer a hydrogen bond donor (though it is still a hydrogen bond acceptor) and possesses aspects of being soluble in nonpolar organic solvents.
