= YM (selective medium) =

YM Agar and Broth, is a selective growth medium with low pH useful for cultivating yeasts, molds, or other acid-tolerant or acidophilic organisms, while deterring growth of most bacteria and other acid intolerant organisms. It is malt extract medium modified by the addition of yeast extract and peptone.

The 'YM' of the name stands either for 'Yeast and Mold', or 'Yeast extract-Malt extract' depending on the source.

Variations include YMG agar/broth, which contains yeast, malt, and glucose.
