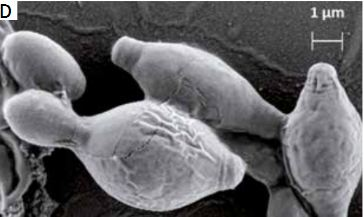
- Hanseniaspora uvarum

Scientific classification
- Kingdom: Fungi
- Division: Ascomycota
- Class: Saccharomycetes
- Order: Saccharomycetales
- Family: Saccharomycodaceae; Kudrjanzev (1960)

Genera
- Hanseniaspora; Saccharomycodes; Vanderwaltia; Wickerhamia

= Saccharomycodaceae =

Family of fungi

The Saccharomycodaceae are a family of yeasts in the order Saccharomycetales. According to the 2023 Species Fungorum Plus, the family contains four accepted genera. Species in the family have a cosmopolitan distribution and are found in both temperate and tropical areas.
