= Cycloheximide =

- Cycloheximide

Names
- Preferred IUPAC name 4-{(2R)-2-[(1S,3S,5S)-3,5-Dimethyl-2-oxocyclohexyl]-2-hydroxyethyl}piperidine-2,6-dione
- Other names Naramycin A, hizarocin, actidione, actispray, kaken, U-4527

Identifiers
CAS Number	66-81-9
3D model (JSmol)	Interactive image
ChEBI	CHEBI:27641
ChEMBL	ChEMBL123292
ChemSpider	5962
ECHA InfoCard	100.000.578
IUPHAR/BPS	5433
KEGG	C06685
PubChem CID	6197
RTECS number	MA4375000
UNII	98600C0908
CompTox Dashboard (EPA)	DTXSID6024882
- InChI: InChI=1S/C15H23NO4/c1-8-3-9(2)15(20)11(4-8)12(17)5-10-6-13(18)16-14(19)7-10/h8-12,17H,3-7H2,1-2H3,(H,16,18,19)/t8-,9-,11-,12+/m0/s1 Key: YPHMISFOHDHNIV-FSZOTQKASA-N; InChI=1/C15H23NO4/c1-8-3-9(2)15(20)11(4-8)12(17)5-10-6-13(18)16-14(19)7-10/h8-12,17H,3-7H2,1-2H3,(H,16,18,19)/t8-,9-,11-,12+/m0/s1 Key: YPHMISFOHDHNIV-FSZOTQKABD
- SMILES: O=C2NC(=O)CC(C[C@@H](O)[C@H]1C(=O)[C@@H](C)C[C@H](C)C1)C2

Properties
Chemical formula	C_{15}H_{23}NO_{4}
Molar mass	281.352 g·mol^{−1}
Appearance	Colorless crystals
Melting point	119.5 to 121 °C (247.1 to 249.8 °F; 392.6 to 394.1 K)

Hazards
- Occupational safety and health (OHS/OSH)
Main hazards	Highly toxic
- GHS labelling
Pictograms	(GHS06: Toxic) (GHS08: Health hazard) (GHS09: Environmental hazard)
Signal word	Danger
Hazard statements	H300, H341, H360D, H411
Precautionary statements	P203, P264, P270, P273, P280, P301+P316, P318, P321, P330, P391, P405, P501
Safety data sheet (SDS)	ECHA SDS
- Except where otherwise noted, data are given for materials in their standard state (at 25 °C [77 °F], 100 kPa). verify (what is ?) Infobox references

Cycloheximide is a naturally occurring fungicide produced by the bacterium Streptomyces griseus. Cycloheximide exerts its effects by interfering with the translocation step in protein synthesis (movement of two tRNA molecules and mRNA in relation to the ribosome), thus blocking eukaryotic translational elongation. Cycloheximide is widely used in biomedical research to inhibit protein synthesis in eukaryotic cells studied in vitro (i.e. outside of organisms). It is inexpensive and works rapidly. Its effects are rapidly reversed by simply removing it from the culture medium.

Due to significant toxic side effects, including DNA damage, teratogenesis, and other reproductive effects (including birth defects and toxicity to sperm), cycloheximide is generally used only in in vitro research applications, and is not suitable for human use as a therapeutic compound. Although it has been used as a fungicide in agricultural applications, this application is now decreasing as the health risks have become better understood.

Because cycloheximide rapidly breaks down in a basic environment, decontamination of work surfaces and containers can be achieved by washing with a non-harmful alkali solution such as soapy water or aqueous sodium bicarbonate.

It is classified as an extremely hazardous substance in the United States as defined in Section 302 of the U.S. Emergency Planning and Community Right-to-Know Act (42 U.S.C. 11002), and is subject to strict reporting requirements by facilities which produce, store, or use it in significant quantities.

== Discovery ==
Cycloheximide was reported in 1946 by Alma Joslyn Whiffen-Barksdale at the Upjohn Company.

== Experimental applications ==
Cycloheximide can be used as an experimental tool in molecular biology to determine the half-life of a protein. Treating cells with cycloheximide in a time-course experiment followed by western blotting of the cell lysates for the protein of interest can show differences in protein half-life. Cycloheximide treatment provides the ability to observe the half-life of a protein without confounding contributions from transcription or translation. Irreversible analogues of cycloheximide have also been reported.

Mitochondrial protein synthesis is resistant to inhibition by cycloheximide. On the other hand chloramphenicol inhibits mitochondrial (and bacterial) protein synthesis, but synthesis on cytoplasmic ribosomes is resistant. Before genomes were available, these inhibitors were used to determine which mitochondrial proteins were synthesized in the mitochondria from mitochondrial genes.

Cycloheximide is used as a plant growth regulator to stimulate ethylene production. It is used as a rodenticide and other animal pesticide. It is also used in media to detect unwanted bacteria in beer fermentation by suppressing yeasts and molds growth in test medium.

The translational elongation freezing properties of cycloheximide are also used for ribosome profiling / translational profiling. Translation is halted via the addition of cycloheximide, and the DNA/RNA in the cell is then nuclease treated. The ribosome-bound parts of RNA can then be sequenced.

Cycloheximide has also been used to make isolation of bacteria from environmental samples easier.

== Spectrum of fungal susceptibility ==
Cycloheximide has been used to isolate dermatophytes and inhibit the growth of fungi in brewing test media. The following represents susceptibility data for a few commonly targeted fungi:

- Candida albicans: 12.5 μg/ml
- Mycosphaerella graminicola: 47.2 μg/ml – 85.4 μg/ml
- Saccharomyces cerevisiae: 0.05 μg/ml – 1.6 μg/ml
- Neoscytalidium dimidiatum is an Athlete's foot like infection resistant to most antifungals but is rather sensitive to cycloheximide, so, it should be cultured in a medium free of cycloheximide.

== See also ==
- Acetoxycycloheximide
- Cycloheximide chase
