= Hydrolysis constant =

The word hydrolysis is applied to chemical reactions in which a substance reacts with water. In organic chemistry, the products of the reaction are usually molecular, being formed by combination with H and OH groups (e.g., hydrolysis of an ester to an alcohol and a carboxylic acid). In inorganic chemistry, the word most often applies to cations forming soluble hydroxide or oxide complexes with, in some cases, the formation of hydroxide and oxide precipitates.

== Metal hydrolysis and associated equilibrium constant values ==
The hydrolysis reaction for a hydrated metal ion in aqueous solution can be written as:

p M^{z+} + q H_{2}O ⇌ M_{p}(OH)^{pz–q}_{q} + q H^{+}

and the corresponding formation constant as:

$$\beta_{pq} = \frac{\left[\mathrm{M}_p(\mathrm{OH})_q^{pz-q}\right]\cdot\left[\mathrm{H}^+\right]^q}{\left[\mathrm{M}^{z+}\right]^p}$$

and associated equilibria can be written as:

MO_{x}(OH)_{z–2x}(s) + z H^{+} ⇌ M^{z+} + (z–x) H_{2}O

MO_{x}(OH)_{z–2x}(s) + x H_{2}O ⇌ M^{z+} + z OH^{−}

p MO_{x}(OH)_{z–2x}(s) + (pz–q) H^{+} ⇌ M_{p}(OH)^{pz–q}_{q} + (pz–px–q) H_{2}O

=== Aluminium ===
Hydrolysis constants (log values) in critical compilations at infinite dilution and T = 298.15 K:

Reaction	Baes and Mesmer, 1976	Brown and Ekberg, 2016	Hummel and Thoenen, 2023
Al^{3+} + H_{2}O ⇌ AlOH^{2+} + H^{+}	–4.97	−4.98 ± 0.02	−4.98 ± 0.02
Al^{3+} + 2 H_{2}O ⇌ Al(OH)_{2}^{+} + 2 H^{+}	–9.3	−10.63 ± 0.09	−10.63 ± 0.09
Al^{3+} + 3 H_{2}O ⇌ Al(OH)_{3} + 3 H^{+}	–15.0	−15.66 ± 0.23	−15.99 ± 0.23
Al^{3+} + 4 H_{2}O ⇌ Al(OH)_{4}^{–} + 4 H^{+}	–23.0	−22.91 ± 0.10	−22.91 ± 0.10
2 Al^{3+} + 2 H_{2}O ⇌ Al_{2}(OH)_{2}^{4+} + 2 H^{+}	–7.7	−7.62 ± 0.11	−7.62 ± 0.11
3 Al^{3+} + 4 H_{2}O ⇌ Al_{3}(OH)_{4}^{5+} + 4 H^{+}	–13.94	−14.06 ± 0.22	−13.90 ± 0.12
13 Al^{3+} + 28 H_{2}O ⇌ Al_{13}O_{4}(OH)_{24}^{7+} + 32 H^{+}	–98.73	−100.03 ± 0.09	−100.03 ± 0.09
α-Al(OH)_{3}(s) + 3 H^{+} ⇌ Al^{3+} + 3 H_{2}O	8.5	7.75 ± 0.08	7.75 ± 0.08
γ-AlOOH(s) + 3 H^{+} ⇌ Al^{3+} + 2 H_{2}O		7.69 ± 0.15	9.4 ± 0.4

=== Americium(III) ===
Hydrolysis constants (log values) in critical compilations at infinite dilution and T = 298.15 K:

Reaction	NIST46	Brown and Ekberg, 2016	Grenthe et al., 2020
Am^{3+} + H_{2}O ⇌ Am(OH)^{2+} + H^{+}	–6.5 ± 0.1	–7.22 ± 0.03	–7.2 ± 0.5
Am^{3+} + 2 H_{2}O ⇌ Am(OH)_{2}^{+} + 2 H^{+}	–14.1 ± 0.3	–14.9 ± 0.2	–15.1 ± 0.7
Am^{3+} + 3 H_{2}O ⇌ Am(OH)_{3} + 3 H^{+}	–25.7	–26.0 ± 0.2	–26.2 ± 0.5
Am^{3+} + 3 H_{2}O ⇌ Am(OH)_{3}(am) + 3 H^{+}	–16.9 ± 0.1	–16.9 ± 0.8	–16.9 ± 0.8
Am^{3+} + 3 H_{2}O ⇌ Am(OH)_{3}(cr) + 3 H^{+}	–15.2	–15.62 ± 0.04	–15.6 ± 0.6

=== Americium(V) ===
Hydrolysis constants (log values) in critical compilations at infinite dilution and T = 298.15 K:

Reaction	Brown and Ekberg, 2016	Grenthe et al., 2020
AmO_{2}^{+} + H_{2}O ⇌ AmO_{2}(OH) + H^{+}	–10.7 ± 0.2	
AmO_{2}^{+} + 2 H_{2}O ⇌ AmO_{2}(OH)_{2}^{–} + 2 H^{+}	–22.9 ± 0.7	
AmO_{2}^{+} + H_{2}O ⇌ AmO_{2}(OH)(am) + H^{+}	–5.4 ± 0.4	–5.3 ± 0.5

=== Antimony(III) ===
Hydrolysis constants (log values) in critical compilations at infinite dilution and T = 298.15 K:

Reaction	Baes and Mesmer, 1976	Lothenbach et al., 1999; Kitamura et al., 2010	Filella and May, 2003
Sb(OH)_{3} + H^{+} ⇌ Sb(OH)_{2}^{+} + H_{2}O	1.41	1.30	1.371
Sb(OH)_{3} + H_{2}O ⇌ Sb(OH)_{4}^{‒} + H^{+}	‒11.82	‒11.93	‒11.70
1/2 Sb_{2}O_{3}(s) + 3/2 H_{2}O ⇌ Sb(OH)_{3}	‒4.24		
Sb_{2}O_{3}(rhombic,s) + 3 H_{2}O ⇌ 2 Sb(OH)_{3}		‒8.72	‒10.00
Sb_{2}O_{3}(cubic,s) + 3 H_{2}O ⇌ 2 Sb(OH)_{3}			‒11.40

=== Antimony(V) ===
Hydrolysis constants (log values) in critical compilations at infinite dilution and T = 298.15 K:

Reaction	Baes and Mesmer, 1976	Lothenbach et al., 1999; Kitamura et al., 2010
Sb(OH)_{5} + H_{2}O ⇌ Sb(OH)_{6}^{‒} + H^{+}	‒2.72	‒2.72
12 Sb(OH)_{5} + 4 H_{2}O ⇌ Sb_{12}(OH)_{64}^{4‒} + 4 H^{+}	20.34	20.34
12 Sb(OH)_{5} + 5 H_{2}O ⇌ Sb_{12}(OH)_{65}^{5‒} + 5 H^{+}	16.72	16.72
12 Sb(OH)_{5} + 6 H_{2}O ⇌ Sb_{12}(OH)_{66}^{6‒} + 6 H^{+}	11.89	11.89
12 Sb(OH)_{5} + 7 H_{2}O ⇌ Sb_{12}(OH)_{67}^{7‒} + 7 H^{+}	6.07	6.07
1/2 Sb_{2}O_{5}(s) + 5/2 H_{2}O ⇌ Sb(OH)_{5}	‒3.7	
Sb_{2}O_{5}(am) + 5 H_{2}O ⇌ 2 Sb(OH)_{5}		‒7.400

=== Arsenic(III) ===
Hydrolysis constants (log values) in critical compilations at infinite dilution and T = 298.15 K:

Reaction	Baes and Mesmer, 1976	Nordstrom and Archer, 2003	Nordstrom et al., 2014
As(OH)_{4}^{‒} + H^{+} ⇌ As(OH)_{3} + H_{2}O	9.29	9.17	9.24 ± 0.02

=== Arsenic(V) ===
Hydrolysis constants (log values) in critical compilations at infinite dilution and T = 298.15 K:

Reaction	Baes and Mesmer	Khodakovsky et al. (1968)	Nordstrom and Archer, 2003	Nordstrom et al., 2014
H_{2}AsO_{4}^{‒} + H^{+} ⇌ H_{3}AsO_{4}	2.24	2.21	2.26 ± 0.078	2.25 ± 0.04
HAsO_{4}^{2‒} + H^{+} ⇌ H_{2}AsO_{4}^{‒}		6.93	6.99 ± 0.1	6.98 ± 0.11
AsO_{4}^{3‒} + H^{+} ⇌ HAsO_{4}^{2‒}		11.51	11.80 ± 0.1	11.58 ± 0.05
HAsO_{4}^{2‒} + 2 H^{+} ⇌H_{3}AsO_{4}	9.20			
AsO_{4}^{3‒} + 3 H^{+} ⇌ H_{3}AsO_{4}	20.70			

=== Barium ===
Hydrolysis constants (log values) in critical compilations at infinite dilution and T = 298.15 K:

Reaction	Baes and Mesmer, 1976	Nordstrom et al., 1990	Brown and Ekberg, 2016
Ba^{2+} + H_{2}O ⇌ BaOH^{+} + H^{+}	–13.47	–13.47	–13.32 ± 0.07

=== Berkelium(III) ===
Hydrolysis constants (log values) in critical compilations at infinite dilution and T = 298.15 K:

Reaction	Brown and Ekberg, 2016
Bk^{3+} + 3 H_{2}O ⇌ Bk(OH)_{3}(s) + 3 H^{+}	–13.5 ± 1.0

=== Beryllium ===
Hydrolysis constants (log values) in critical compilations at infinite dilution and T = 298.15 K:

Reaction	Baes and Mesmer, 1976
Be^{2+} + H_{2}O ⇌ BeOH^{+} + H^{+}	–5.10
Be^{2+} + 2 H_{2}O ⇌ Be(OH)_{2} + 2 H^{+}	–23.65
Be^{2+} + 3 H_{2}O ⇌ Be(OH)_{3}^{–} + 3 H^{+}	–23.25
Be^{2+} + 4 H_{2}O ⇌ Be(OH)_{4}^{2–} + 4 H^{+}	–37.42
2 Be^{2+} + H_{2}O ⇌ Be_{2}OH^{3+} + H^{+}	–3.97
3 Be^{2+} + 3 H_{2}O ⇌ Be_{3}(OH)_{3}^{3+} + 3 H^{+}	–8.92
6 Be^{2+} + 8 H_{2}O ⇌ Be_{6}(OH)_{8}^{4+} + 8 H^{+}	–27.2
α-Be(OH)_{2}(cr) + 2 H^{+} ⇌ Be^{2+} + 2 H_{2}O	6.69

=== Bismuth ===
Hydrolysis constants (log values) in critical compilations at infinite dilution and T = 298.15 K:

Reaction	Baes and Mesmer, 1976	Lothenbach et al., 1999	NIST46	Kitamura et al., 2010	Brown and Ekberg, 2016
Bi^{3+} + H_{2}O ⇌ BiOH^{2+} + H^{+}	–1.0	–0.92	–1.1	–0.920	–0.92 ± 0.15
Bi^{3+} + 2 H_{2}O ⇌ Bi(OH)_{2}^{+} + 2 H^{+}	(–4)	–2.56	–4.5	–2.560 ± 1.000	–2.59 ± 0.26
Bi^{3+} + 3 H_{2}O ⇌ Bi(OH)_{3} + 3 H^{+}	–8.86	–5.31	–9.0	–8.940 ± 0.500	–8.78 ± 0.20
Bi^{3+} + 4 H_{2}O ⇌ Bi(OH)_{4}^{–} + 4 H^{+}	–21.8	–18.71	–21.2	–21.660 ± 0.870	–22.06 ± 0.14
3 Bi^{3+} + 4 H_{2}O ⇌ Bi_{3}(OH)_{4}^{5+} + 4 H^{+}		–0.80		–0.800	
6 Bi^{3+} + 12 H_{2}O ⇌ Bi_{6}(OH)_{12}^{6+} + 12 H^{+}		1.34		1.340	0.98 ± 0.13
9 Bi^{3+} + 20 H_{2}O = Bi_{9}(OH)_{20}^{7+} + 20 H^{+}		–1.36		–1.360	
9 Bi^{3+} + 21 H_{2}O = Bi_{9}(OH)_{21}^{6+} + 21 H^{+}		–3.25		–3.250	
9 Bi^{3+} + 22 H_{2}O = Bi_{9}(OH)_{22}^{5+} + 22 H^{+}		–4.86		–4.860	
Bi(OH)_{3}(am) + 3 H^{+} = Bi^{3+} + 3 H_{2}O				31.501 ± 0.927	
α-Bi_{2}O_{3}(cr) + 6 H^{+} = 2 Bi^{3+} + 3 H_{2}O		0.76			
BiO_{1.5}(s, α) + 3 H^{+} = Bi^{3+} + 1.5 H_{2}O	3.46			31.501 ± 0.927	2.88 ± 0.64

=== Boron ===
Hydrolysis constants (log values) in critical compilations at infinite dilution and T = 298.15 K:

Reaction	Baes and Mesmer, 1976	NIST46
B(OH)_{3} + H_{2}O ⇌ Be(OH)_{4}^{+} + H^{+}	–9.236	–9.236 ± 0.002
2 B(OH)_{3} ⇌ B_{2}(OH)_{5}^{–} + H^{+}	–9.36	–9.306
3 B(OH)_{3} ⇌ B_{3}O_{3}(OH)_{4}^{–} + H^{+} + 2 H_{2}O	–7.03	–7.306
4 B(OH)_{3} ⇌ B_{4}O_{5}(OH)_{4}^{2–} + 2 H^{+} + 3 H_{2}O	–16.3	–15.032

=== Cadmium ===
Hydrolysis constants (log values) in critical compilations at infinite dilution and T = 298.15 K:

Reaction	Baes and Mesmer, 1976	Powell et al., 2011	Brown and Ekberg, 2016
Cd^{2+} + H_{2}O ⇌ CdOH^{+} + H^{+}	−10.08	–9.80 ± 0.10	−9.81 ± 0.10
Cd^{2+} + 2 H_{2}O ⇌ Cd(OH)_{2} + 2 H^{+}	–20.35	–20.19 ± 0.13	−20.6 ± 0.4
Cd^{2+} + 3 H_{2}O ⇌ Cd(OH)_{3}^{–} + 3 H^{+}	<–33.3	–33.5 ± 0.5	−33.5 ± 0.5
Cd^{2+} + 4 H_{2}O ⇌ Cd(OH)_{4}^{2–} + 4 H^{+}	–47.35	–47.28 ± 0.15	−47.25 ± 0.15
2 Cd^{2+} + H_{2}O ⇌ Cd_{2}OH^{3+} + H^{+}	–9.390	–8.73 ± 0.01	−8.74 ± 0.10
4 Cd^{2+} + 4 H_{2}O ⇌ Cd_{4}(OH)_{4}^{4+} + 4 H^{+}	–32.85		
Cd(OH)_{2}(s) ⇌ Cd^{2+} + 2 OH^{–}		–14.28 ± 0.12	
Cd(OH)_{2}(s) + 2 H^{+} ⇌ Cd^{2+} + 2 H_{2}O	13.65	13.72 ± 0.12	13.71 ± 0.12

=== Calcium ===
Hydrolysis constants (log values) in critical compilations at infinite dilution and T = 298.15 K:

Reaction	Baes and Mesmer, 1976	Nordstrom et al., 1990	Brown and Ekberg, 2016
Ca^{2+} + H_{2}O ⇌ CaOH^{+} + H^{+}	–12.85	–12.78	–12.57 ± 0.03
Ca(OH)_{2}(cr) + 2 H^{+} ⇌ Ca^{2+} + 2 H_{2}O	22.80	22.8	22.75 ± 0.02

=== Californium(III) ===
Hydrolysis constants (log values) in critical compilations at infinite dilution and T = 298.15 K:

Reaction	Brown and Ekberg, 2016
Cf^{3+} + 3 H_{2}O ⇌ Cf(OH)_{3}(s) + 3 H^{+}	–13.0 ± 1.0

=== Cerium(III) ===
Hydrolysis constants (log values) in critical compilations at infinite dilution and T = 298.15 K:

Reaction	Baes and Mesmer, 1976	NIST46	Brown and Ekberg, 2016
Ce^{3+} + H_{2}O ⇌ CeOH^{2+} + H^{+}	–8.3	–8.3	–8.31 ± 0.03
2 Ce^{3+} + 2 H_{2}O ⇌ Ce_{2}(OH)_{2}^{4+} + 2 H^{+}			–16.0 ± 0.2
3 Ce^{3+} + 5 H_{2}O ⇌ Ce_{3}(OH)_{5}^{4+} + 5 H^{+}			–34.6 ± 0.3
Ce(OH)_{3}(s) + 3 H^{+} ⇌ Ce^{3+} + 3 H_{2}O			18.5 ± 0.5
Ce(OH)_{3}(s) ⇌ Ce^{3+} + 3 OH^{–}		–22.1 ± 0.9	

=== Chromium(II) ===
Hydrolysis constants (log values) in critical compilations at infinite dilution and T = 298.15 K (The divalent state is unstable in water, producing hydrogen whilst being oxidised to a higher valency state (Baes and Mesmer, 1976). The reliability of the data is in doubt.):

Reaction	NIST46	Ball and Nordstrom, 1988
Cr^{2+} + H_{2}O ⇌ CrOH^{+} + H^{+}	–5.5	
Cr(OH)_{2}(s) ⇌ Cr^{2+} + 2 OH^{–}		–17 ± 0.02

=== Chromium(III) ===
Hydrolysis constants (log values) in critical compilations at infinite dilution and T = 298.15 K:

Reaction	Baes and Mesmer, 1976	Rai et al., 1987	Ball and Nordstrom, 1988	Brown and Ekberg, 2016
Cr^{3+} + H_{2}O ⇌ CrOH^{2+} + H^{+}	–4.0	–3.57 ± 0.08		–3.60 ± 0.07
Cr^{3+} + 2 H_{2}O ⇌ Cr(OH)_{2}^{+} + 2 H^{+}	–9.7	–9.84		–9.65 ± 0.20
Cr^{3+} + 3 H_{2}O ⇌ Cr(OH)_{3} + 3 H^{+}	–18	–16.19		–16.25 ± 0.19
Cr^{3+} + 4 H_{2}O ⇌ Cr(OH)_{4}^{−} + 4 H^{+}	–27.4	–27.65 ± 0.12		–27.56 ± 0.21
2 Cr^{3+} + 2 H_{2}O ⇌ Cr_{2}(OH)_{2}^{4+} + 2 H^{+}	–5.06	–5.0		–5.29 ± 0.16
3 Cr^{3+} + 4 H_{2}O ⇌ Cr_{3}(OH)_{4}^{5+} + 4 H^{+}	–8.15	–10.75 ± 0.15		–9.10 ± 0.14
Cr(OH)_{3}(s) + 3 H^{+} ⇌ Cr^{3+} + 3 H_{2}O	12		9.35	9.41 ± 0.17
Cr_{2}O_{3}(s) + 6 H^{+} ⇌ 2 Cr^{3+} + 3 H_{2}O			8.52	
CrO_{1.5}(s) + 3 H^{+} ⇌ Cr^{3+} + 1.5 H_{2}O				7.83 ± 0.10

=== Chromium(VI) ===
Hydrolysis constants (log values) in critical compilations at infinite dilution and T = 298.15 K:

Reaction	Baes and Mesmer, 1976	Ball and Nordstrom, 1998
CrO_{4}^{2–} + H^{+} ⇌ HCrO_{4}^{–}	6.51	6.55 ± 0.04
HCrO_{4}^{–} + H^{+} ⇌ H_{2}CrO_{4}	–0.20	
CrO_{4}^{2}– + 2 H^{+} ⇌ H_{2}CrO_{4}		6.31
2 HCrO_{4}^{–} ⇌ Cr_{2}O_{7}^{2–} + H_{2}O	1.523	
2 CrO_{4}^{2–} + 2 H^{+} ⇌ Cr_{2}O_{7}^{2–} + H_{2}O		14.7 ± 0.1

=== Cobalt(II) ===
Hydrolysis constants (log values) in critical compilations at infinite dilution and T = 298.15 K:

Reaction	Baes and Mesmer, 1976	Brown and Ekberg, 2016
Co^{2+} + H_{2}O ⇌ CoOH^{+} + H^{+}	–9.65	−9.61 ± 0.17
Co^{2+} + 2 H_{2}O ⇌ Co(OH)_{2} + 2 H^{+}	–18.8	−19.77 ± 0.11
Co^{2+} + 3 H_{2}O ⇌ Co(OH)_{3}^{–} + 3 H^{+}	–31.5	−32.01 ± 0.33
Co^{2+} + 4 H_{2}O ⇌ Co(OH)_{4}^{2–} + 4 H^{+}	–46.3	
2 Co^{2+} + H_{2}O ⇌ Co_{2}(OH)^{3+} + H^{+}	–11.2	
4 Co^{2+} + 4 H_{2}O ⇌ Co_{4}(OH)_{4}^{4+} + 4 H^{+}	–30.53	
Co(OH)_{2}(s) + 2 H^{+} ⇌ Co^{2+} + 2 H_{2}O	12.3	13.24 ± 0.12
CoO(s) + 2 H^{+} ⇌ Co^{2+} + H_{2}O		13.71 ± 0.10

=== Cobalt(III) ===
Hydrolysis constants (log values) in critical compilations at infinite dilution and T = 298.15 K:

Reaction	Brown and Ekberg, 2016
Co^{3+} + H_{2}O ⇌ CoOH^{2+} + H^{+}	−1.07 ± 0.11

=== Copper(I) ===
Hydrolysis constants (log values) in critical compilations at infinite dilution and T = 298.15 K:

Reaction	Brown and Ekberg, 2016
Cu^{+} + H_{2}O ⇌ CuOH + H^{+}	–7.8 ± 0.4
Cu^{+} + 2 H_{2}O ⇌ Cu(OH)_{2}^{–} + 2 H^{+}	–18.6 ± 0.6

=== Copper(II) ===
Hydrolysis constants (log values) in critical compilations at infinite dilution and T = 298.15 K:

Reaction	Baes and Mesmer, 1976	NIST46	Plyasunova et al., 1997	Powell et al., 2007	Brown and Ekberg, 2016
Cu^{2+} + H_{2}O ⇌ CuOH^{+} + H^{+}	< –8	–7.7	–7.97 ± 0.09	–7.95 ± 0.16	–7.64 ± 0.17
Cu^{2+} + 2 H_{2}O ⇌ Cu(OH)_{2} + 2 H^{+}	(< –17.3)	–17.3	–16.23 ± 0.15	–16.2 ± 0.2	–16.24 ± 0.03
Cu^{2+} + 3 H_{2}O ⇌ Cu(OH)_{3}^{–} + 3 H^{+}	(< –27.8)	–27.8	–26.63 ± 0.40	–26.60 ± 0.09	–26.65 ± 0.13
Cu^{2+} + 4 H_{2}O ⇌ Cu(OH)_{4}^{2–} + 4 H^{+}	–39.6	–39.6	–39.73 ± 0.17	–39.74 ± 0.18	–39.70 ± 0.19
2 Cu^{2+} + H_{2}O ⇌ Cu_{2}(OH)_{3}^{+} + H^{+}			–6.71 ± 0.30	–6.40 ± 0.12	–6.41 ± 0.17
2 Cu^{2+} + 2 H_{2}O ⇌ Cu_{2}(OH)_{2}^{2+} + 2 H^{+}	–10.36	–10.3	–10.55 ± 0.17	–10.43 ± 0.07	–10.55 ± 0.02
3 Cu^{2+} + 4 H_{2}O ⇌ Cu_{3}(OH)_{4}^{2+} + 4 H^{+}			–20.95 ± 0.30	–21.1 ± 0.2	–21.2 ± 0.4
CuO(s) + 2 H^{+} ⇌ Cu^{2+} + H_{2}O	7.62		7.64 ± 0.06	7.64 ± 0.06	7.63 ± 0.05
Cu(OH)_{2}(s) + 2 H^{+} ⇌ Cu^{2+} + 2 H_{2}O				8.67 ± 0.05	8.68 ± 0.10

=== Curium ===
Hydrolysis constants (log values) in critical compilations at infinite dilution and T = 298.15 K:

Reaction	Brown and Ekberg, 2016
Cm^{3+} + H_{2}O ⇌ Cm(OH)^{2+} + H^{+}	−7.66 ± 0.07
Cm^{3+} + 2 H_{2}O ⇌ Cm(OH)_{2}^{+} + 2 H^{+}	−15.9 ± 0.1
Cm^{3+} + 3 H_{2}O ⇌ Cm(OH)_{3}(s) + 3 H^{+}	−13.9 ± 0.4

=== Dysprosium ===
Hydrolysis constants (log values) in critical compilations at infinite dilution and T = 298.15 K:

Reaction	Baes and Mesmer, 1976	Brown and Ekberg, 2016
Dy^{3+} + H_{2}O ⇌ DyOH^{2+} + H^{+}	−8.0	−7.53 ± 0.14
Dy^{3+} + 2 H_{2}O ⇌ Dy(OH)_{2}^{+} + 2 H^{+}	(–16.2)	
Dy^{3+} + 3 H_{2}O ⇌ Dy(OH)_{3} + 3 H^{+}	(–24.7)	
Dy^{3+} + 4 H_{2}O ⇌ Dy(OH)_{4}^{−} + 4 H^{+}	–33.5	
2 Dy^{3+} + 2 H_{2}O ⇌ Dy_{2}(OH)_{2}^{4+} + 2 H^{+}		−13.76 ± 0.20
3 Dy^{3+} + 5 H_{2}O ⇌ Dy_{3}(OH)_{5}^{4+} + 5 H^{+}		−30.6 ± 0.3
Dy(OH)_{3}(s) + 3 H^{+} ⇌ Dy^{3+} + 3 H_{2}O	15.9	16.26 ± 0.30
Dy(OH)_{3}(c) + OH^{−} ⇌ Dy(OH)_{4}^{−}	−3.6	
Dy(OH)_{3}(c) ⇌ Dy(OH)_{3}	−8.8	

=== Erbium ===
Hydrolysis constants (log values) in critical compilations at infinite dilution and T = 298.15 K:

Reaction	Baes and Mesmer, 1976	Brown and Ekberg, 2016
Er^{3+} + H_{2}O ⇌ ErOH^{2+} + H^{+}	−7.9	−7.46 ± 0.09
Er^{3+} + 2 H_{2}O ⇌ Er(OH)_{2}^{+} + 2 H^{+}	(−15.9)	
Er^{3+} + 3 H_{2}O ⇌ Er(OH)_{3} + 3 H^{+}	(−24.2)	
Er^{3+} + 4 H_{2}O ⇌ Er(OH)_{4}^{−} + 4 H^{+}	−32.6	
2 Er^{3+} + 2 H_{2}O ⇌ Er_{2}(OH)_{2}^{4+} + 2 H^{+}	−13.65	−13.50 ± 0.20
3 Er^{3+} + 5 H_{2}O ⇌ Er_{3}(OH)_{5}^{4+} + 5 H^{+}	<−29.3	−31.0 ± 0.3
Er(OH)_{3}(s) + 3 H^{+} ⇌ Er^{3+} + 3 H_{2}O	15.0	15.79 ± 0.30
Er(OH)_{3}(c) + OH^{−} ⇌ Er(OH)_{4}^{−}	−3.6	
Er(OH)_{3}(c) ⇌ Er(OH)_{3}	~ −9.2	

=== Europium ===
Hydrolysis constants (log values) in critical compilations at infinite dilution and T = 298.15 K:

Reaction	Baes and Mesmer, 1976	NIST46	Hummel et al., 2002	Brown and Ekberg, 2016
Eu^{3+} + H_{2}O ⇌ EuOH^{2+} + H^{+}	–7.8		–7.64 ± 0.04	–7.66 ± 0.05
Eu^{3+} + 2 H_{2}O ⇌ Eu(OH)_{2}^{+} + 2 H^{+}			–15.1 ± 0.2	
Eu^{3+} + 3 H_{2}O ⇌ Eu(OH)_{3} + 3 H^{+}			–23.7 ± 0.1	
Eu^{3+} + 4 H_{2}O ⇌ Eu(OH)_{4}^{−} + 4 H^{+}			–36.2 ± 0.5	
2 Eu^{3+} + 2 H_{2}O ⇌ Eu_{2}(OH)_{2}^{4+} + 2 H^{+}			-	–14.1 ± 0.2
3 Eu^{3+} + 5 H_{2}O ⇌ Eu_{3}(OH)_{5}^{4+} + 5 H^{+}			-	–32.0 ± 0.3
Eu(OH)_{3}(s) + 3 H^{+} ⇌ Eu^{3+} + 3 H_{2}O	17.5		17.6 ± 0.8 (am); 14.9 ± 0.3 (cr)	16.48 ± 0.30
Eu(OH)_{3}(s) ⇌ Eu^{3+} + 3 OH^{–}		–24.5 ± 0.7 (am) –26.5 (cr)		

=== Gadolinium ===
Hydrolysis constants (log values) in critical compilations at infinite dilution and T = 298.15 K:

Reaction	Baes and Mesmer, 1976	Brown and Ekberg, 2016
Gd^{3+} + H_{2}O ⇌ GdOH^{2+} + H^{+}	–8.0	–7.87 ± 0.05
Gd^{3+} + 2 H_{2}O ⇌ Gd(OH)_{2}^{+} + 2 H^{+}	(–16.4)	
Gd^{3+} + 3 H_{2}O ⇌ Gd(OH)_{3} + 3 H^{+}	(–25.2)	
Gd^{3+} + 4 H_{2}O ⇌ Gd(OH)_{4}^{–} + 4 H^{+}	–34.4	
2 Gd^{3+} + 2 H_{2}O ⇌ Gd_{2}(OH)_{2}^{4+} + 2 H^{+}		–14.16 ± 0.20
3 Gd^{3+} + 5 H_{2}O ⇌ Gd_{3}(OH)_{5}^{4+} + 5 H^{+}		–33.0 ± 0.3
Gd(OH)_{3}(s) + 3 H^{+} ⇌ Gd^{3+} + 3 H_{2}O	15.6	17.20 ± 0.48
Gd(OH)_{3}(c) + OH^{–} ⇌ Gd(OH)_{4}^{–}	–4.8	
Gd(OH)_{3}(c) ⇌ Gd(OH)_{3}	–9.6	

=== Gallium ===
Hydrolysis constants (log values) in critical compilations at infinite dilution and T = 298.15 K:

Reaction	Baes and Mesmer, 1976	Smith et al., 2003	Brown and Ekberg, 2016
Ga^{3+} + H_{2}O ⇌ GaOH^{2+} + H^{+}	–2.6	–2.897	–2.74
Ga^{3+} + 2 H_{2}O ⇌ Ga(OH)_{2}^{+} + 2 H^{+}	–5.9	–6.694	–7.0
Ga^{3+} + 3 H_{2}O ⇌ Ga(OH)_{3} + 3 H^{+}	–10.3		–11.96
Ga^{3+} + 4 H_{2}O ⇌ Ga(OH)_{4}^{–} + 4 H^{+}	–16.6	–16.588	–15.52
Ga(OH)_{3}(s) ⇌ Ga^{3+} + 3 OH^{–}	$\approx$–37	–37.0	
GaO(OH)(s) + H_{2}O ⇌ Ga^{3+} + 3 OH^{–}	–39.06	–39.1	–40.51

=== Germanium ===
Hydrolysis constants (log values) in critical compilations at infinite dilution and T = 298.15 K:

Reaction	Baes and Mesmer, 1976	Wood and Samson, 2006	Filella and May, 2023
Ge(OH)_{4} ⇌ GeO(OH)_{3}^{−} + H^{+}	–9.31	–9.32 ± 0.05	–9.099
Ge(OH)_{4} ⇌ GeO_{2}(OH)_{2}^{2+} + 2 H^{+}	–21.9		
GeO_{2}(OH)_{2}^{2–} + H^{+} ⇌ GeO(OH)_{3}^{–}			12.76
8 Ge(OH)_{4} ⇌ Ge_{8}O_{16}(OH)_{3}^{3-} + 13 H_{2}O + 3 H^{+}	–14.24		
8 Ge(OH)_{4} + 3 OH^{–} ⇌ Ge_{8}(OH)_{35}^{3–}			28.33
GeO_{2}(s, hexa) + 2 H_{2}O ⇌ Ge(OH)_{4}		–1.35	–1.373
GeO_{2}(s, tetra) + 2 H_{2}O ⇌ Ge(OH)_{4}	-4.37	–5.02	–4.999

=== Gold(III) ===
Hydrolysis constants (log values) in critical compilations at infinite dilution and T = 298.15 K:

Reaction	Baes and Mesmer, 1976
Au(OH)_{3} + 2 H^{+} ⇌ AuOH^{2+} + 2 H_{2}O	1.51
Au(OH)_{3} + H^{+} ⇌ Au(OH)_{2}^{+} + H_{2}O	< 1.0
Au(OH)_{3} + H_{2}O ⇌ Au(OH)_{4}^{–} + H^{+}	–11.77
Au(OH)_{3} + 2 H_{2}O ⇌ Au(OH)_{5}^{2–} + 2 H^{+}	–25.13
Au(OH)_{5}^{2–} + 3 H_{2}O ⇌ Au(OH)_{6}^{3}– + 3 H^{+}	< –41.1
Au(OH)_{3}(c) ⇌ Au(OH)_{3}	–5.51

=== Hafnium ===
Hydrolysis constants (log values) in critical compilations at infinite dilution and T = 298.15 K:

Reaction	Baes and Mesmer, 1976	Brown and Ekberg, 2016
Hf^{4+} + H_{2}O ⇌ HfOH^{3+} + H^{+}	–0.25	−0.26 ± 0.10
Hf^{4+} + 2 H_{2}O ⇌ Hf(OH)_{2}^{2+} + 2 H^{+}	(–2.4)	
Hf^{4+} + 3 H_{2}O ⇌ Hf(OH)_{3}^{+} + 3 H^{+}	(–6.0)	
Hf^{4+} + 4 H_{2}O ⇌ Hf(OH)_{4} + 4 H^{+}	–10.7*	−3.75 ± 0.34*
Hf^{4+} + 5 H_{2}O ⇌ Hf(OH)_{5}^{–} + 5 H^{+}	–17.2	
3 Hf^{4+} + 4 H_{2}O ⇌ Hf_{3}(OH)_{4}^{8+} + 4 H^{+}		0.55 ± 0.30
4 Hf^{4+} + 8 H_{2}O ⇌ Hf_{4}(OH)_{8}^{8+} + 8 H^{+}		6.00 ± 0.30
HfO_{2}(s) + 4 H^{+} ⇌ Hf^{4+} + 2 H_{2}O	–1.2*	–5.56 ± 0.15*
HfO_{2}(am) + 4 H^{+} ⇌ Hf^{4+} + 2 H_{2}O		–3.11 ± 0.20

*Errors in compilations concerning equilibrium and/or data elaboration. Data not recommended. Strongly suggested to refer to the original papers.

=== Holmium ===
Hydrolysis constants (log values) in critical compilations at infinite dilution and T = 298.15 K:

Reaction	Baes and Mesmer, 1976	Brown and Ekberg, 2016
Ho^{3+} + H_{2}O ⇌ HoOH^{2+} + H^{+}	−8.0	−7.43 ± 0.05
2 Ho^{3+} + 2 H_{2}O ⇌ Ho_{2}(OH)_{2}^{4+} + 2 H^{+}		−13.5 ± 0.2
3 Ho^{3+} + 5 H_{2}O ⇌ Ho_{3}(OH)_{5}^{4+} + 5 H^{+}		−30.9 ± 0.3
Ho(OH)_{3}(s) + 3 H^{+} ⇌ Ho^{3+} + 3 H_{2}O	15.4	15.60 ± 0.30

=== Indium ===
Hydrolysis constants (log values) in critical compilations at infinite dilution and T = 298.15 K:

Reaction	Baes and Mesmer, 1976	NIST46	Brown and Ekberg, 2016
In^{3+} + H_{2}O ⇌ InOH^{2+} + H^{+}	–4.00	–3.927	–3.96
In^{3+} + 2 H_{2}O ⇌ In(OH)_{2}^{+} + 2 H^{+}	–7.82	–7.794	–9.16
In^{3+} + 3 H_{2}O ⇌ In(OH)_{3} + 3 H^{+}	–12.4	–12.391	
In^{3+} + 4 H_{2}O ⇌ In(OH)_{4}^{–} + 4 H^{+}	–22.07	–22.088	–22.05
In(OH)_{3}(s) ⇌ In^{3+} + 3 OH^{–}	–36.92	–36.9	–36.92
1/2 In_{2}O_{3}(s) + 3/2 H_{2}O ⇌ In^{3+} + 3 OH^{–}			–35.24

=== Iridium ===
Hydrolysis constants (log values) in critical compilations at infinite dilution and T = 298.15 K:

Reaction	Brown and Ekberg, 2016
Ir^{3+} + H_{2}O ⇌ IrOH^{2+} + H^{+}	‒3.77 ± 0.10
Ir^{3+} + 2 H_{2}O ⇌ Ir(OH)_{2}^{+} + 2 H^{+}	‒8.46 ± 0.20
Ir(OH)_{3}(s) + 3 H^{+} ⇌ Ir^{3+} + 3 H_{2}O	8.88 ± 0.20

=== Iron(II) ===
Hydrolysis constants (log values) in critical compilations at infinite dilution and T = 298.15 K:

Reaction	Baes and Mesmer, 1976	Nordstrom et al., 1990	Hummel et al., 2002	Lemire et al., 2013	Brown and Ekberg, 2016
Fe^{2+} + H_{2}O ⇌ FeOH^{+} + H^{+}	–9.3	–9.5	–9.5	–9.1 ± 0.4	−9.43 ± 0.10
Fe^{2+} + 2 H_{2}O ⇌ Fe(OH)_{2} + 2 H^{+}	–20.5				−20.52 ± 0.08
Fe^{2+} + 3 H_{2}O ⇌ Fe(OH)_{3}^{−} + 3 H^{+}	–29.4				−32.68 ± 0.15
Fe(OH)_{2}(s) + 2 H^{+} ⇌ Fe^{2+} + 2 H_{2}O					12.27 ± 0.88

=== Iron(III) ===
Hydrolysis constants (log values) in critical compilations at infinite dilution and T = 298.15 K:

Reaction	Baes and Mesmer, 1976	Lemire et al., 2013	Brown and Ekberg, 2016
Fe^{3+} + H_{2}O ⇌ FeOH^{2+} + H^{+}	–2.19	−2.15 ± 0.07	–2.20 ± 0.02
Fe^{3+} + 2 H_{2}O ⇌ Fe(OH)_{2}^{+} + 2 H^{+}	–5.67	−4.8 ± 0.4	–5.71 ± 0.10
Fe^{3+} + 3 H_{2}O ⇌ Fe(OH)_{3} + 3 H^{+}	<–12	<–14	–12.42 ± 0.20
Fe^{3+} + 4 H_{2}O ⇌ Fe(OH)_{4}^{–} + 4 H^{+}	–21.6	−21.5 ± 0.5	–21.60 ± 0.23
2 Fe^{3+} + 2 H_{2}O ⇌ Fe_{2}(OH)_{2}^{4+} + 2 H^{+}	–2.95	–2.91 ± 0.07	–2.91 ± 0.07
3 Fe^{3+} + 4 H_{2}O ⇌ Fe_{3}(OH)_{4}^{5+} + 4 H^{+}	–6.3		−6.3 ± 0.1
Fe(OH)_{3}(s) + 3 H^{+} ⇌ Fe3^{+} + 3 H_{2}O; 2-line ferrihydrite	2.5	3.5	3.50 ± 0.20
Fe(OH)_{3}(s) ⇌ Fe^{3+} + 3 OH^{−} 6-line ferrihydrite		−38.97 ± 0.64	
α-FeOOH(s)+ 3 H^{+} ⇌ Fe^{3+} + 2 H_{2}O goethite	0.5		0.33 ± 0.10
α-FeOOH + H_{2}O ⇌ Fe^{3+} + 3 OH^{−} goethite		−41.83 ± 0.37	
1/2 α-Fe_{2}O_{3}(s)+ 3 H^{+} ⇌ Fe^{3+} + 1.5 H_{2}O hematite			0.36 ± 0.40
1/2 α-Fe_{2}O_{3} + 3/2 H_{2}O ⇌ Fe^{3+} + 3 OH^{−} hematite		−42.05 ± 0.26	
1/2 γ-Fe_{2}O_{3}(s) + 3 H^{+} ⇌ Fe^{3+} + 3/2 H_{2}O maghemite			1.61 ± 0.61
1/2 γ-Fe_{2}O_{3} + 3/2 H_{2}O ⇌ Fe^{3+} + 3 OH^{−} maghemite		−40.59 ± 0.29	
α-FeOOH(s)+ 3 H^{+} ⇌ Fe^{3+} + 2 H_{2}O goethite			1.85 ± 0.37
γ-FeOOH + H_{2}O ⇌ Fe^{3+} + 3 OH^{−} lepidocrocite		−40.13 ± 0.37	
Fe(OH)_{3}(s) + 3 H^{+} ⇌ Fe^{3+} + 3 H_{2}O magnetite			−12.26 ± 0.26

=== Lanthanum ===
Hydrolysis constants (log values) in critical compilations at infinite dilution and T = 298.15 K:

Reaction	Baes and Mesmer, 1976	Brown and Ekberg, 2016
La^{3+} + H_{2}O ⇌ LaOH^{2+} + H^{+}	–8.5	–8.89 ± 0.10
2 La^{3+} + 2 H_{2}O ⇌ La_{2}(OH)_{2}^{4+} + 2 H^{+}	≤ –17.5	–17.57 ± 0.20
3 La^{3+} + 5 H_{2}O ⇌ La_{3}(OH)_{5}^{4+} + 5 H^{+}	≤ –38.3	–37.8 ± 0.3
5 La^{3+} + 9 H_{2}O ⇌ La_{5}(OH)_{9}^{6+} + 9 H^{+}	–71.2	
La(OH)_{3}(s) + 3 H^{+} ⇌ La^{3+} + 3 H_{2}O	20.3	19.72 ± 0.34

=== Lead(II) ===
Hydrolysis constants (log values) in critical compilations at infinite dilution and T = 298.15 K:

Reaction	Baes and Mesmer, 1976	NIST46	Powell et al., 2009	Brown and Ekberg, 2016	Cataldo et al., 2018
Pb^{2+} + H_{2}O ⇌ PbOH^{+} + H^{+}	–7.71	–7.6	–7.46 ± 0.06	–7.49 ± 0.13	–6.47 ± 0.03
Pb^{2+} + 2 H_{2}O ⇌ Pb(OH)_{2} + 2 H^{+}	–17.12	–17.1	–16.94 ± 0.09	–16.99 ± 0.06	–16.12 ± 0.01
Pb^{2+} + 3 H_{2}O ⇌ Pb(OH)^{3-} + 3 H^{+}	–28.06	–28.1	–28.03 ± 0.06	–27.94 ± 0.21	–28.4 ± 0.1
Pb^{2+} + 4 H_{2}O ⇌ Pb(OH)_{4}^{2-} + 4 H^{+}			–40.8		
2 Pb^{2+} + H_{2}O ⇌ Pb_{2}(OH)_{3}^{+} + H^{+}	–6.36	–6.4	–7.28 ± 0.09	–6.73 ± 0.31	
3 Pb^{2+} + 4 H_{2}O ⇌ Pb_{3}(OH)_{4}^{2+} + 4 H^{+}	–23.88	–23.9	–23.01 ± 0.07	–23.43 ± 0.10	
3 Pb^{2+} + 5 H_{2}O ⇌ Pb_{3}(OH)_{5}^{+} + 5 H^{+}				–31.11 ± 0.10	
4 Pb^{2+} + 4 H_{2}O ⇌ Pb_{4}(OH)_{4}^{4+} + 4 H^{+}	–20.88	–20.9	–20.57 ± 0.06	–20.71 ± 0.18	
6 Pb^{2+} + 8 H_{2}O ⇌ Pb_{6}(OH)_{8}^{4+} + 8 H^{+}	–43.61	–43.6	–42.89 ± 0.07	–43.27 ± 0.47	
PbO(s) + 2 H^{+} ⇌ Pb^{2+} + H_{2}O			12.62 (red); 12.90 (yellow)		
PbO(s) + H_{2}O ⇌ Pb^{2+} + 2 OH^{–}	–15.28 (red)	-15.3	–15.3 (red) –15.1 (yellow)	–15.37 ± 0.04 (red) –15.1 ± 0.08 (yellow)	
Pb_{2}O(OH)_{2}(s) + H_{2}O ⇌ 2 Pb^{2+} + 4 OH^{–}			–14.9		
PbO(s) +H_{2}O ⇌ Pb(OH)_{2}			–4.4 (red) –4.2 (yellow)		
Pb_{2}O(OH)_{2}(s) +H_{2}O ⇌ 2 Pb(OH)_{2}			–4.0		
PbO(s) + 2 H_{2}O ⇌ Pb(OH)_{3}^{–} + H^{+}			–1.4 (red) –1.2 (yellow)		
Pb_{2}O(OH)_{2}(s) + 2 H_{2}O ⇌ 2 Pb(OH)_{3}^{–} + 2 H^{+}			–1.0		

=== Lead(IV) ===
Hydrolysis constants (log values) in critical compilations at infinite dilution and T = 298.15 K:

Reaction	Feitknecht and Schindler, 1963
β-PbO_{2} + 2 H_{2}O ⇌ Pb^{4+} + 4 OH^{–}	–64
β-PbO_{2} + 2 H_{2}O + 2 OH^{–} ⇌ Pb(OH)_{6}^{2–}	–4.5

=== Lithium ===
Hydrolysis constants (log values) in critical compilations at infinite dilution and T = 298.15 K:

Reaction	Baes and Mesmer, 1976	Nordstrom et al., 1990	Brown and Ekberg, 2016
Li^{+} + H_{2}O ⇌ LiOH + H^{+}	–13.64	–13.64	–13.84 ± 0.14

=== Magnesium ===
Hydrolysis constants (log values) in critical compilations at infinite dilution and T = 298.15 K:

Reaction	Baes and Mesmer, 1976	Nordstrom et al., 1990	Brown and Ekberg, 2016
Mg^{2+} + H_{2}O ⇌ MgOH^{+} + H^{+}	–11.44	–11.44	–11.70 ± 0.04
4 Mg^{2+} + 4 H_{2}O ⇌ Mg_{4}(OH)_{4}^{4+} + 4 H^{+}	–39.71		
Mg(OH)_{2}(cr) + 2 H^{+} ⇌ Mg^{2+} + 2 H_{2}O	16.84	16.84	17.11 ± 0.04

=== Manganese(II) ===
Hydrolysis constants (log values) in critical compilations at infinite dilution and T = 298.15 K:

Reaction	Perrin et al., 1969	Baes and Mesmer, 1976	Nordstrom et al., 1990	Hummel et al., 2002	Brown and Ekberg, 2016
Mn^{2+} + H_{2}O ⇌ MnOH^{+} + H^{+}	–10.59	–10.59	–10.59	–10.59	−10.58 ± 0.04
Mn^{2+} + 2 H_{2}O ⇌ Mn(OH)_{2} + 2 H^{+}		–22.2			−22.18 ± 0.20
Mn^{2+} + 3 H_{2}O ⇌ Mn(OH)_{3}^{–} + 3 H^{+}		–34.8			−34.34 ± 0.45
Mn^{2+} + 4 H_{2}O ⇌ Mn(OH)_{4}^{2–} + 4 H^{+}		–48.3			−48.28 ± 0.40
2 Mn^{2+} + H_{2}O ⇌ Mn_{2}OH^{3+} + H^{+}		–10.56			
2 Mn^{2+} + 3 H_{2}O ⇌ Mn_{2}(OH)_{3}^{+} + 6 H^{+}		–23.90			
Mn(OH)_{2}(s) + 2 H^{+} ⇌ Mn^{2+} + 2 H_{2}O	15.2	15.2	15.2		15.19 ± 0.10
MnO(s) + 2 H^{+} ⇌ Mn^{2+} + H_{2}O					17.94 ± 0.12

=== Manganese(III) ===
Hydrolysis constants (log values) in critical compilations at infinite dilution and T = 298.15 K:

Reaction	Brown and Ekberg, 2016
Mn^{3+} + H_{2}O ⇌ MnOH^{2+} + H^{+}	–11.70 ± 0.04

=== Mercury(I) ===
Hydrolysis constants (log values) in critical compilations at infinite dilution and T = 298.15 K:

Reaction	Baes and Mesmer, 1976	Brown and Ekberg, 2016
Hg_{2}^{2+} + H_{2}O ⇌ Hg_{2}OH^{+} + H^{+}	−5.0^{a}	−4.45 ± 0.10

(^{a}) 0.5 M HClO_{4}

=== Mercury(II) ===
Hydrolysis constants (log values) in critical compilations at infinite dilution and T = 298.15 K:

Reaction	Baes and Mesmer, 1976	Powell et all, 2005	Brown and Ekberg, 2016
Hg^{2}+ + H_{2}O ⇌ HgOH^{+} + H^{+}	−3.40	–3.40 ± 0.08	–3.40 ± 0.08
Hg^{2+} + 2 H_{2}O ⇌ Hg(OH)_{2} + 2 H^{+}	-6.17	–5.98 ± 0.06	−5.96 ± 0.07
Hg^{2+} + 3 H_{2}O ⇌ Hg(OH)_{3}^{–} + 3 H^{+}	–21.1	–21.1 ± 0.3	
HgO(s) + 2 H^{+} ⇌ Hg^{2+} + H_{2}O	2.56	2.37 ± 0.08	2.37 ± 0.08

=== Molybdenum(VI) ===
Hydrolysis constants (log values) in critical compilations at infinite dilution, T = 298.15 K and I = 3 M NaClO_{4} (^{a}) or 0.1 M Na^{+} medium. Data at I = 0 are not available (^{b}):

Reaction	Baes and Mesmer, 1976	Jolivet, 2000	NIST46	Crea et al., 2017
MoO_{4}^{2–} + H^{+} ⇌ HMoO_{4}^{–}	3.89^{a}		4.24	4.47 ± 0.02
MoO_{4}^{2–} + 2 H^{+} ⇌ H_{2}MoO_{4}	7.50^{a}			8.12 ± 0.03
HMoO_{4}^{–} + H^{+} ⇌ H_{2}MoO_{4}			4.0	
Mo_{7}O_{24}^{6–} + H^{+} ⇌ HMo_{7}O_{24}^{5–}		4.4		
HMo_{7}O_{24}^{5–} + H^{+} ⇌ H_{2}Mo7O_{24}^{4–}		3.5		
H_{2}Mo_{7}O_{24}^{4–} + H^{+} ⇌ H_{3}Mo_{7}O_{24}^{3–}		2.5		
7 MoO_{4}^{2-}+ 8 H^{+} ⇌ Mo_{7}O_{24}^{6–} + 4 H_{2}O	57.74^{a}		52.99^{b}	51.93 ± 0.04
7 MoO_{4}^{2–} + 9 H^{+} ⇌ Mo_{7}O_{23}(OH)^{5–} + 4 H_{2}O	62.14^{a}			58.90 ± 0.02
7 MoO_{4}^{2–} + 10 H^{+} ⇌ Mo_{7}O_{22}(OH)_{2}^{4–} + 4 H_{2}O	65.68^{a}			64.63 ± 0.05
7 MoO_{4}^{2–} + 11 H^{+} ⇌ Mo_{7}O_{21}(OH)_{3}^{3–} + 4 H_{2}O	68.21^{a}			68.68 ± 0.06
19 MoO_{4}^{2-} + 34 H^{+} ⇌ Mo_{19}O_{59}^{4–} + 17 H_{2}O	196.3^{a}		196^{a}	
MoO_{3}(s) + H_{2}O ⇌ MoO_{4}^{2–} + 2 H^{+}	–12.06^{a}			

=== Neodymium ===
Hydrolysis constants (log values) in critical compilations at infinite dilution and T = 298.15 K:

Reaction	Baes and Mesmer, 1976	NIST46	Neck et al., 2009	Brown and Ekberg, 2016
Nd^{3+} + H_{2}O ⇌ NdOH^{2+} + H^{+}	–8.0	–8.0	–7.4 ± 0.4	–8.13 ± 0.05
Nd^{3+} + 2 H_{2}O ⇌ Nd(OH)_{2}^{+} + 2 H^{+}	(–16.9)		–15.7 ± 0.7	
Nd^{3+} + 3 H_{2}O ⇌ Nd(OH)_{3}(aq) + 3 H^{+}	(–26.5)		–26.2 ± 0.5	
Nd^{3+} + 4 H_{2}O ⇌ Nd(OH)_{4}^{−} + 4 H^{+}	(–37.1)	–37.4	–40.7 ± 0.7	
2 Nd^{3+} + 2 H_{2}O ⇌ Nd_{2}(OH)_{2}^{4+} + 2 H^{+}	–13.86	–13.9		–15.56 ± 0.20
3 Nd^{3+} + 5 H_{2}O ⇌ Nd_{3}(OH)_{5}^{4+} + 5 H^{+}	< –28.5			–34.2 ± 0.3
Nd(OH)_{3}(s) + 3 H^{+} ⇌ Nd^{3+} + 3 H_{2}O	18.6		17.2 ± 0.4	17.89 ± 0.09
Nd(OH)_{3}(s) ⇌ Nd^{3+} + 3 OH^{–}		–23.2 ± 0.9	–21.5 (act) –23.1 (inact)	

=== Neptunium(III) ===
Hydrolysis constants (log values) in critical compilations at infinite dilution and T = 298.15 K:

Reaction	Brown and Ekberg, 2016	Grenthe et al., 2020
Np^{3+} + H_{2}O ⇌ NpOH^{2+} + H^{+}	-7.3 ± 0.5	–6.8 ± 0.3

=== Neptunium(IV) ===
Hydrolysis constants (log values) in critical compilations at infinite dilution and T = 298.15 K:

Reaction	Baes and Mesmer, 1976<	NIST46	Brown and Ekberg, 2016	Grenthe et al., 2020
Np^{4+} + H_{2}O ⇌ NpOH^{3+} + H^{+}	–1.49	–1.5	–1.31 ± 0.05	0.5 ± 0.2
Np^{4+} + 2 H_{2}O ⇌ Np(OH)_{2}^{2+} + 2 H^{+}			–3.7 ± 0.3	0.3 ± 0.3
Np^{4+} + 4 H_{2}O ⇌ Np(OH)_{4} + 4 H^{+}			–10.0 ± 0.9	–8 ± 1
Np^{4+} + 4 OH^{−} ⇌ NpO_{2}(am, hyd) + 2 H_{2}O	52	54.9 ± 0.4	57.5 ± 0.3	56.7 ± 0.5

=== Neptunium(V) ===
Hydrolysis constants (log values) in critical compilations at infinite dilution and T = 298.15 K:

Reaction	Baes and Mesmer, 1976	Brown and Ekberg, 2016	Grenthe et al., 2020
NpO_{2}^{+} + + H_{2}O ⇌ NpO_{2}(OH) + H^{+}	–8.85	–10.7 ± 0.5	–11.3 ± 0.7
NpO_{2}^{+} + 2 H_{2}O ⇌ NpO_{2}(OH)_{2}^{−} + 2 H^{+}		–22.8 ± 0.7	–23.6 ± 0.5
NpO_{2}^{+} + H_{2}O ⇌ NpO_{2}(OH)(am, fresh) + H^{+}	≤ –4.7	–5.21 ± 0.05	–5.3 ± 0.2
NpO_{2}^{+} + H_{2}O ⇌ NpO_{2}(OH)(am, aged) + H^{+}		–4.53 ± 0.06	–4.7 ± 0.5

=== Neptunium(VI) ===
Hydrolysis constants (log values) in critical compilations at infinite dilution and T = 298.15 K:

Reaction	Baes and Mesmer, 1976	NIST46	Brown and Ekberg, 2016	Grenthe et al., 2020
NpO_{2}^{2+} + H_{2}O ⇌ NpO_{2}(OH)^{+} + H^{+}	–5.15	–5.12	–5.1 ± 0.2	–5.1 ± 0.4
NpO_{2}^{2+} + 3 H_{2}O ⇌ NpO_{2}(OH)_{3}^{−} + 3 H^{+}			–21 ± 1	
NpO_{2}^{2+} + 4 H_{2}O ⇌ NpO_{2}(OH)_{4}^{2-} + 4 H^{+}			–32 ± 1	
2 NpO_{2}^{2+} + 2 H_{2}O ⇌ (NpO_{2})_{2}(OH)_{2}^{2+} + 2 H^{+}	–6.39	–6.39	–6.2 ± 0.2	–6.2 ± 0.2
3 NpO_{2}^{2+} + 5 H_{2}O ⇌ (NpO_{2})_{3}(OH)_{5}^{+} + 5 H^{+}	–17.49	–17.49	–17.0 ± 0.2	–17.1 ± 0.2
NpO_{2}^{2+} + 2 H_{2}O ⇌ NpO_{3}.H_{2}O(cr) + 2 H^{+}	≥-6.6		–5.4 ± 0.4	–5.4 ± 0.4

=== Nickel(II) ===
Hydrolysis constants (log values) in critical compilations at infinite dilution and T = 298.15 K:

Reaction	Feitknecht and Schindler, 1963	Baes and Messmer, 1976	NIST46	Gamsjäger et al., 2005	Thoenen et al., 2014	Brown and Ekberg, 2016
Ni^{2+} + H_{2}O ⇌ NiOH^{+} + H^{+}		–9.86	–9.9	–9.54 ± 0.14	–9.54 ± 0.14	–9.90 ± 0.03
Ni^{2+} + 2 H_{2}O ⇌ Ni(OH)_{2} + 2 H^{+}		–19	–19		< –18	–21.15 ± 0.0
Ni^{2+} + 3 H_{2}O ⇌ Ni(OH)_{3}^{–} + 3 H^{+}		–30	–30	–29.2 ± 1.7	–29.2 ± 1.7	
Ni^{2+} + 4 H_{2}O ⇌ Ni(OH)_{4}^{2–} + 4 H^{+}		< –44				
2 Ni^{2+} + H_{2}O ⇌ Ni_{2}(OH)^{3+} + H^{+}		–10.7		–10.6 ± 1.0	–10.6 ± 1.0	–10.6 ± 1.0
4 Ni^{2+} + 4 H_{2}O ⇌ Ni_{4}(OH)_{4}^{4+} + 4 H^{+}		–27.74	–27.7	–27.52 ± 0.15	–27.52 ± 0.15	–27.9 ± 0.6
β-Ni(OH)_{2}(s) + 2 H^{+} ⇌ Ni^{2+} + 2 H_{2}O		10.8			11.02 ± 0.20	10.96 ± 0.20; 11.75 ± 0.13 (microcr)
Ni(OH)_{2}(s) ⇌ Ni^{2+} + 2 OH^{–}	–17.2 (inactive)		–17.2	–16.97 ± 0.20 (β) –17.2 ± 1.3 (cr)		
Ni(OH)_{2}(s) + OH^{–} ⇌ Ni(OH)_{3}^{–}	–4.2 (inactive)					
NiO(cr) + 2 H^{+} ⇌ Ni^{2+} + H_{2}O				12.38 ± 0.06		12.48 ± 0.15

=== Niobium ===
Hydrolysis constants (log values) in critical compilations at infinite dilution and T = 298.15 K:

Reaction	Baes and Mesmer, 1976	Filella and May, 2020
Nb(OH)_{5} + H^{+} ⇌ Nb(OH)_{4}^{+} + H_{2}O	~ –0.6	1.603
Nb(OH)_{5} + H_{2}O ⇌ Nb(OH)_{6}^{–} + H^{+}	~ –4.8	–4.951
Nb_{6}O_{19}^{8–} + H^{+} ⇌ HNb_{6}O_{19}^{7–}		14.95
HNb_{6}O_{19}^{7–} + H^{+} ⇌ H_{2}Nb_{6}O_{19}^{6–}		13.23
H_{2}Nb_{6}O_{19}^{6–} + H^{+} ⇌ H_{3}Nb_{6}O_{19}^{5–}		11.73
1/2 Nb_{2}O_{5}(act) + 5/2 H_{2}O ⇌ Nb(OH)_{5}	~ –7.4	
Nb(OH)_{5}(am,s) ⇌ Nb(OH)_{5}		–7.510
Nb_{2}O_{5}(s) + 5 H_{2}O ⇌ 2 Nb(OH)_{5}		–18.31

=== Osmium(VI) ===
Hydrolysis constants (log values) in critical compilations at infinite dilution, I = 0.1 M and T = 298.15 K:

Reaction	Galbács et al., 1983
OsO_{2}(OH)_{4}^{2–} + H^{+} ⇌ HOsO_{2}(OH)_{4}^{–}	10.4
HOsO_{2}(OH)_{4}^{–} + H^{+} ⇌ H_{2}OsO_{2}(OH)_{4}	8.5

=== Osmium(VIII) ===
Hydrolysis constants (log values) in critical compilations at infinite dilution and T = 298.15 K:

Reaction	Galbács et al., 1983
OsO_{2}(OH)_{3}(O^{−})(aq) + H^{+} ⇌ OsO_{2}(OH)_{4}(aq)	12.2^{a}
OsO_{2}(OH)_{2}(O^{−})_{2}(aq) + H^{+} ⇌ OsO_{2}(OH)_{3}(O^{−})(aq)	14.4^{b}

(^{a}) At I = 0.1 M (^{b}) At I = 2.5 M

=== Palladium ===
Hydrolysis constants (log values) in critical compilations at infinite dilution and T = 298.15 K:

Reaction	Perrin et al., 1969	Hummel et al., 2002	Kitamura and Yul, 2010	Brown and Ekberg, 2016
Pd^{2+} + H_{2}O ⇌ PdOH^{+} + H^{+}	−0.96		−0.65 ± 0.64	−1.16 ± 0.30
Pd^{2+} + 2 H_{2}O ⇌ Pd(OH)_{2} + 2 H^{+}	−2.6	−4 ± 1	−3.11 ± 0.63	−3.07 ± 0.16
Pd^{2+} + 3 H_{2}O ⇌ Pd(OH)_{3}^{−} + 3 H^{+}		−15.5 ± 1	−14.20 ± 0.63	
Pd(OH)_{2}(am) + 2 H^{+} ⇌ Pd^{2+} + 2 H_{2}O		−3.3 ± 1		−3.4 ± 0.2

=== Plutonium(III) ===
Hydrolysis constants (log values) in critical compilations at infinite dilution and T = 298.15 K:

Reaction	Baes and Mesmer, 1976	NIST46	Brown and Ekberg, 2016	Grenthe et al., 2020
Pu^{3+} + H_{2}O ⇌ PuOH^{2+} + H^{+}		–7.0	–6.9 ± 0.2	–6.9 ± 0.3
Pu^{3+} + 3 H_{2}O ⇌ Pu(OH)_{3}(cr) + 3 H^{+}	–19.65		–15.8 ± 0.8	–15 ± 1

=== Plutonium(IV) ===
Hydrolysis constants (log values) in critical compilations at infinite dilution and T = 298.15 K:

Reaction	Baes and Mesmer, 1976	NIST46	Brown and Ekberg, 2016	Grenthe et al., 2020
Pu^{4+} + H_{2}O ⇌ PuOH ^{3+} + H^{+}	–0.5	–0.5	–0.7 ± 0.1	0.6 ± 0.2
Pu^{4+} + 2 H_{2}O ⇌ Pu(OH)_{2}^{2+} + 2 H^{+}	(–2.3)			0.6 ± 0.3
Pu^{4+} + 3 H_{2}O ⇌ Pu(OH)_{3}^{+} + 3 H^{+}	(–5.3)			–2.3 ± 0.4
Pu^{4+} + 4 H_{2}O ⇌ Pu(OH)_{4} + 4 H^{+}	–9.5		–12.5 ± 0.7	–8.5 ± 0.5
Pu^{4+} + 4 OH^{−} ⇌ PuO_{2}(am, hyd) + 2 H_{2}O	49.5		47.9 ± 0.4 (0w); 53.8 ± 0.5 (1w)	58.3 ± 0.5

=== Plutonium(V) ===
Hydrolysis constants (log values) in critical compilations at infinite dilution and T = 298.15 K:

Reaction	Baes and Mesmer, 1976	NIST46	Brown and Ekberg, 2016	Grenthe et al., 2020
PuO_{2}^{+} + H_{2}O ⇌ PuO_{2}(OH) + H^{+}	–1.49	–1.5	–1.31 ± 0.05	0.5 ± 0.2
PuO^{2+} + H_{2}O ⇌ PuO_{2}(OH)(am) + H^{+}			–3.7 ± 0.3	0.3 ± 0.3

=== Plutonium(VI) ===
Hydrolysis constants (log values) in critical compilations at infinite dilution and T = 298.15 K:

Reaction	Baes and Mesmer, 1976	NIST46	Brown and Ekberg, 2016	Grenthe et al., 2020
PuO_{2}^{2+} + H_{2}O ⇌ PuO_{2}(OH)^{+} + H^{+}	–5.6	–5.6	–5.36 ± 0.09	–5.5 ± 0.5
PuO_{2}^{2+} + 2 H_{2}O ⇌ PuO_{2}(OH)_{2} + 2 H^{+}			–12.9 ± 0.2	–13 ± 1
PuO_{2}^{2+} + 3 H_{2}O ⇌ PuO_{2}(OH)_{3}^{−} + 3 H^{+}				–24 ± 1
2 PuO_{2}^{2+} + 2 H_{2}O ⇌ (PuO_{2})_{2}(OH)_{2}^{2+} + 2 H^{+}	–8.36	–8.36	–7.8 ± 0.5	–7 ± 1
3 PuO_{2}^{2+} + 5 H_{2}O ⇌ (PuO_{2})_{3}(OH)_{5}^{+} + 5 H^{+}	–21.65	–21.65		
PuO_{2}^{2+} + 2 OH^{−} ⇌ PuO_{2}(OH)_{2}(am, hyd)				22.8 ± 0.6

=== Potassium ===
Hydrolysis constants (log values) in critical compilations at infinite dilution and T = 298.15 K:

Reaction	Baes and Mesmer, 1976	Nordstrom et al., 1990	Brown and Ekberg, 2016
K^{+} + H_{2}O ⇌ KOH + H^{+}	–14.46	–14.46	–14.5 ± 0.4

=== Praseodymium ===
Hydrolysis constants (log values) in critical compilations at infinite dilution and T = 298.15 K:

Reaction	Baes and Mesmer, 1976	NIST46	Brown and Ekberg, 2016
Pr^{3+} + H_{2}O ⇌ PrOH^{2+} + H^{+}	–8.1		–8.30 ± 0.03
2 Pr^{3+} + 2 H_{2}O ⇌ Pr_{2}(OH)_{2}^{4}+ + 2 H^{+}			–16.31 ± 0.20
3 Pr^{3+} + 5 H_{2}O ⇌ Pr_{3}(OH)_{5}^{4+} + 5 H^{+}			–35.0 ± 0.3
Pr(OH)_{3}(s) + 3 H^{+} ⇌ Pr^{3+} + 3 H_{2}O	19.5		18.57 ± 0.20
Pr(OH)_{3}(s) ⇌ Pr^{3+} + 3 OH^{–}		–22.3 ± 1.0	

=== Radium ===
Hydrolysis constants (log values) in critical compilations at infinite dilution and T = 298.15 K:

Reaction	Nordstrom et al., 1990
Ra^{2+} + H_{2}O ⇌ RaOH^{+} + H^{+}	–13.49

=== Rhodium ===
Hydrolysis constants (log values) in critical compilations at infinite dilution and T = 298.15 K:

Reaction	Perrin et al., 1969	Baes and Mesmer, 1976	Brown and Ekberg
Rh^{3+} + H_{2}O ⇌ RhOH_{2}^{+} + H^{+}	‒3.43	‒3.4	‒3.09 ± 0.1
Rh(OH)_{3}(c) + OH^{‒} ⇌ Rh(OH)_{4}^{‒}		‒3.9	

=== Samarium ===
Hydrolysis constants (log values) in critical compilations at infinite dilution and T = 298.15 K:

Reaction	Baes and Mesmer, 1976	NIST46	Brown and Ekberg
Sm^{3+} + H_{2}O ⇌ SmOH^{2+} + H^{+}	–7.9	–7.9	–7.84 ± 0.11
2 Sm^{3+} + 2 H_{2}O ⇌ Sm_{2}(OH)_{2}^{4+} + 2 H^{+}			–14.75 ± 0.20
3 Sm^{3+} + 5 H_{2}O ⇌ Sm_{3}(OH)_{5}^{4+} + 5 H^{+}			–33.9 ± 0.3
Sm(OH)_{3}(s) + 3 H^{+} ⇌ Sm^{3+} + 3 H_{2}O	16.5		17.19 ± 0.30
Sm(OH)_{3}(s) ⇌ Sm^{3+} + 3 OH^{−}		–23.9 ± 0.9 (am) –25.9 (cr)	

=== Scandium ===
Hydrolysis constants (log values) in critical compilations at infinite dilution and T = 298.15 K:

Reaction	Baes and Mesmer, 1976	Brown and Ekberg, 2016
Sc^{3+} + H_{2}O ⇌ ScOH^{2+} + H^{+}	–4.3	–4.16 ± 0.05
Sc^{3+} + 2 H_{2}O ⇌ Sc(OH)_{2}^{+} + 2 H^{+}	–9.7	–9.71 ± 0.30
Sc^{3+} + 3 H_{2}O ⇌ Sc(OH)_{3} + 3 H^{+}	–16.1	–16.08 ± 0.30
Sc^{3+} + 4 H_{2}O ⇌ Sc(OH)_{4}^{–}+ 4 H^{+}	–26	–26.7 ± 0.3
2 Sc^{3+} + 2 H_{2}O ⇌ Sc_{2}(OH)_{2}^{4+} + 2 H^{+}	–6.0	–6.02 ± 0.10
3 Sc^{3+} + 5 H_{2}O ⇌ Sc_{3}(OH)_{5}^{4+} + 5 H^{+}	–16.34	–16.33 ± 0.10
Sc(OH)_{3}(s) + 3 H^{+} ⇌ Sc^{3+} + 3 H_{2}O		9.17 ± 0.30
ScO_{1.5}(s) + 3 H^{+} ⇌ Sc^{3+} + 1.5 H_{2}O		5.53 ± 0.30
ScO(OH)(c) + 3 H^{+} ⇌ Sc^{3+} + 2 H_{2}O	9.4	
Sc(OH)_{3}(c) + OH^{–} ⇌ Sc(OH)_{4}		–3.5 ± 0.2

=== Selenium(−II) ===
Hydrolysis constants (log values) in critical compilations at infinite dilution and T = 298.15 K:

Reaction	Olin et al., 2015	Thoenen et al., 2014
H_{2}Se(g) ⇌ H_{2}Se(aq)	–1.10 ± 0.01	–1.10 ± 0.01
H_{2}Se ⇌ HSe^{–} + H^{+}	–3.85 ± 0.05	–3.85 ± 0.05
HSe^{–} ⇌ Se^{2–} + H^{+}	–14.91 ± 0.20	

=== Selenium(IV) ===
Hydrolysis constants (log values) in critical compilations at infinite dilution and T = 298.15 K:

Reaction	Baes and Mesmer, 1976	Olin et al., 2005	Thoenen et al., 2014
SeO_{3}^{2–} + H^{+} ⇌ HSeO_{3}^{–}	8.50	8.36 ± 0.23	8.36 ± 0.23
HSeO_{3}^{–} + H^{+} ⇌ H_{2}SeO_{3}	2.75	2.64 ± 0.14	2.64 ± 0.14

=== Selenium(VI) ===
Hydrolysis constants (log values) in critical compilations at infinite dilution and T = 298.15 K:

Reaction	Baes and Mesmer, 1976	Olin et al., 2005	Thoenen et al., 2014
SeO_{4}^{2‒} + H^{+} ⇌ HSeO_{4}^{‒}	1.360	1.75 ± 0.10	1.75 ± 0.10

=== Silicon ===
Hydrolysis constants (log values) in critical compilations at infinite dilution and T = 298.15 K:

Reaction	Baes and Mesmer, 1976	Thoenen et al., 2014
Si(OH)_{4} ⇌ SiO(OH)_{3}^{–} + H^{+}	–9.86	–9.81 ± 0.02
Si(OH)_{4} ⇌ SiO_{2}(OH)_{2}^{2–} + 2 H^{+}	–22.92	–23.14 ± 0.09
4 Si(OH)_{4} ⇌ Si_{4}O_{6}(OH)_{6}^{4–} + 2 H^{+} + 4 H_{2}O	–13.44	
4 Si(OH)_{4} ⇌ Si_{4}O_{8}(OH)_{4}^{4–} + 4 H^{+} + 4 H_{2}O	–35.80	–36.3 ± 0.2
SiO_{2}(quartz) + 2 H_{2}O ⇌ Si(OH)_{4}	–4.0	–3.739 ± 0.087
SiO_{2}(am) + 2 H_{2}O ⇌ Si(OH)_{4}		–2.714

=== Silver ===
Hydrolysis constants (log values) in critical compilations at infinite dilution and T = 298.15 K:

Reaction	Baes and Mesmer, 1976	Brown and Ekberg, 2016
Ag^{+} + H_{2}O ⇌ AgOH + H^{+}	−12.0	−11.75 ± 0.14
Ag^{+} + 2 H_{2}O ⇌ Ag(OH)_{2}^{−} + 2 H^{+}	−24.0	−24.34 ± 0.14
1/2 Ag_{2}O(am) + H^{+} ⇌ Ag^{+} + 1/2 H_{2}O	6.29	6.27 ± 0.05

=== Sodium ===
Hydrolysis constants (log values) in critical compilations at infinite dilution and T = 298.15 K:

Reaction	Baes and Mesmer, 1976	Nordstrom et al., 1990	Brown and Ekberg, 2016
Na^{+} + H_{2}O ⇌ NaOH + H^{+}	–14.18	–14.18	–14.4 ± 0.2

=== Strontium ===
Hydrolysis constants (log values) in critical compilations at infinite dilution and T = 298.15 K:

Reaction	Baes and Mesmer, 1976	Nordstrom et al., 1990	Brown and Ekberg, 2016
Sr^{2+} + H_{2}O ⇌ SrOH^{+} + H^{+}	–13.29	–13.29	–13.15 ± 0.05

=== Tantalum ===
Hydrolysis constants (log values) in critical compilations at infinite dilution and T = 298.15 K:

Reaction	Baes and Mesmer, 1976	Filella and May, 2019^{a}
Ta(OH)_{5} + H^{+} ⇌ Ta(OH)_{4}^{+} + H_{2}O	~1	0.7007
Ta(OH)_{5} + H_{2}O ⇌ Ta(OH)_{6}^{–} + H^{+}	~ –9.6	
Ta_{6}O_{19}^{8–} + H^{+} ⇌ HTa_{6}O_{19}^{7–}		16.35
HTa_{6}O_{19}^{7–} + H^{+} ⇌ H_{2}Ta_{6}O_{19}^{6–}		14.00
1/2 Ta_{2}O_{5}(act) + 5/2 H_{2}O ⇌ Ta(OH)_{5}	~ –5.2	
Ta(OH)_{5}(s) ⇌ Ta(OH)_{5}		–5.295
Ta_{2}O_{5}(s) + 5 H_{2}O ⇌ 2 Ta(OH)_{5}		–20.00

(^{a}) The number of significant figures are retained to minimise propagation of round-off errors; they should not be taken to indicate the relative uncertainty of the values, which is always at least one order of magnitude less than indicated.

=== Tellurium(−II) ===
Hydrolysis constants (log values) in critical compilations at infinite dilution and T = 298.15 K:

Reaction	Filella and May, 2019^{a}
Te^{2‒} + H^{+} ⇌ HTe^{‒}	11.81
HTe^{‒} + H^{+} ⇌ H_{2}Te	2.476

(^{a}) The number of significant figures are retained to minimise propagation of round-off errors; they should not be taken to indicate the relative uncertainty of the values, which is always at least one order of magnitude less than indicated.

=== Tellurium(IV) ===
Hydrolysis constants (log values) in critical compilations at infinite dilution and T = 298.15 K:

Reaction	Baes and Mesmer, 1976	Filella and May, 2019^{a}
TeO_{3}^{2‒} + H^{+} ⇌ HTeO_{3}^{‒}		9.928
HTeO_{3}^{‒} + H^{+} ⇌ H_{2}TeO_{3}		6.445
H_{2}TeO_{3} ⇌ HTeO_{3}^{‒} + H^{+}	‒2.68	
H_{2}TeO_{3} ⇌ TeO_{3}^{2‒} + 2 H^{+}	‒12.5	
H_{2}TeO_{3} + H^{+} ⇌ Te(OH)_{3}^{+}	3.13	2.415
TeO_{2}(s) + H_{2}O ⇌ H_{2}TeO_{3}		‒4.709

(^{a}) The number of significant figures are retained to minimise propagation of round-off errors; they should not be taken to indicate the relative uncertainty of the values, which is always at least one order of magnitude less than indicated.

=== Tellurium(VI) ===
Hydrolysis constants (log values) in critical compilations at infinite dilution and T = 298.15 K:

Reaction	Baes and Mesmer, 1976	Filella and May, 2019^{a}
TeO_{2}(OH)_{4}^{2‒} + H^{+} ⇌ TeO(OH)_{5}^{‒}		10.83
TeO(OH)_{5}^{‒} + H^{+} ⇌ Te(OH)_{6}	7.68	7.696
TeO_{2}(OH)_{4}^{2‒} + 2 H^{+} ⇌ Te(OH)_{6}	18.68	
TeO_{3}(OH)_{3}^{3‒} + 3 H^{+} ⇌ Te(OH)_{6}	34.3	
2 Te(OH)_{6} ⇌ Te_{2}O(OH)_{11}^{‒} + H^{+}		‒6.929

(^{a}) The number of significant figures are retained to minimise propagation of round-off errors; they should not be taken to indicate the relative uncertainty of the values, which is always at least one order of magnitude less than indicated.

=== Terbium ===
Hydrolysis constants (log values) in critical compilations at infinite dilution and T = 298.15 K:

Reaction	Baes and Mesmer, 1976	Brown and Ekberg, 2016
Tb^{3+} + H_{2}O ⇌ TbOH^{2+} + H^{+}	−7.9	−7.60 ± 0.09
2 Tb^{3+} + 2 H_{2}O ⇌ Tb_{2}(OH)_{2}^{4+} + 2 H^{+}		−13.9 ± 0.2
3 Tb^{3+} + 5 H_{2}O ⇌ Tb_{3}(OH)_{5}^{4+} + 5 H^{+}		−31.7 ± 0.3
Tb(OH)_{3}(s) + 3 H^{+} ⇌ Tb^{3+} + 3 H_{2}O	16.5	16.33 ± 0.30

=== Thallium(I) ===
Hydrolysis constants (log values) in critical compilations at infinite dilution and T = 298.15 K:

Reaction	Baes and Mesmer, 1976	Brown and Ekberg, 2016
Tl^{+} + H_{2}O ⇌ TlOH + H^{+}	–13.21	
Tl^{+} + OH^{–} ⇌ TlOH		0.64 ± 0.05
Tl^{+} + 2 OH^{–} ⇌ Tl(OH)_{2}^{–}		–0.7 ± 0.7
1/2 Tl_{2}O(s) + H^{+} ⇌ Tl^{+} + 1/2 H_{2}O		13.55 ± 0.20

(^{a}) The number of significant figures are retained to minimise propagation of round-off errors; they should not be taken to indicate the relative uncertainty of the values, which is always at least one order of magnitude less than indicated.

=== Thallium(III) ===
Hydrolysis constants (log values) in critical compilations at infinite dilution and T = 298.15 K:

Reaction	Baes and Mesmer, 1976	Brown and Ekberg, 2016
Tl^{3+} + H_{2}O ⇌ TlOH^{2+} + H^{+}	–0.62	–0.22 ± 0.19
Tl^{3+} + 2 H_{2}O ⇌ Tl(OH)_{2}^{+} + 2 H^{+}	–1.57	
Tl^{3+} + 3 H_{2}O ⇌ Tl(OH)_{3} + 3 H^{+}	–3.3	
Tl^{3+} + 4 H_{2}O ⇌ Tl(OH)_{4}^{–} + 4 H^{+}	–15.0	
1/2 Tl_{2}O_{3}(s) + 3 H^{+} ⇌ Tl^{3+} + 3/2 H_{2}O	–3.90	–3.90 ± 0.10

(^{a}) The number of significant figures are retained to minimise propagation of round-off errors; they should not be taken to indicate the relative uncertainty of the values, which is always at least one order of magnitude less than indicated.

=== Thorium ===
Hydrolysis constants (log values) in critical compilations at infinite dilution and T = 298.15 K:

Reaction	Baes and Mesmer, 1976	Rand et al., 2008	Thoenen et al., 2014	Brown and Ekberg, 2016
Th^{4+} + H_{2}O ⇌ ThOH^{3+} + H^{+}	–3.20	–2.5 ± 0.5	–2.5 ± 0.5	–2.5 ± 0.5
Th^{4+} + 2 H_{2}O ⇌ Th(OH)_{2}^{2+} + 2 H^{+}	–6.93	–6.2 ± 0.5	–6.2 ± 0.5	–6.2 ± 0.5
Th^{4+} + 3 H_{2}O ⇌ Th(OH)_{3}^{+} + 3 H^{+}	< –11.7			
Th^{4+} + 4 H_{2}O ⇌ Th(OH)_{4} + 4 H^{+}	–15.9	–17.4 ± 0.7	–17.4 ± 0.7	–17.4 ± 0.7
2 Th^{4+} + 2 H_{2}O ⇌ Th_{2}(OH)_{2}^{6+} + 2 H^{+}	–6.14	–5.9 ± 0.5	–5.9 ± 0.5	–5.9 ± 0.5
2 Th^{4+} + 3 H_{2}O ⇌ Th_{2}(OH)_{3}^{5+} + 3 H^{+}		–6.8 ± 0.2	–6.8 ± 0.2	–6.8 ± 0.2
4 Th^{4+} + 8 H_{2}O ⇌ Th_{4}(OH)_{8}^{8+} + 8 H^{+}	–21.1	–20.4 ± 0.4	–20.4 ± 0.4	–20.4 ± 0.4
4 Th^{4+} + 12 H_{2}O ⇌ Th_{4}(OH)_{12}^{4+} + 12 H^{+}		–26.6 ± 0.2	–26.6 ± 0.2	–26.6 ± 0.2
6 Th^{4+} + 15 H_{2}O(l) ⇌ Th_{6}(OH)_{15}^{9+} + 15 H^{+}	–36.76	–36.8 ± 1.5	–36.8 ± 1.5	–36.8 ± 1.5
6 Th^{4+} + 14 H_{2}O(l) ⇌ Th_{6}(OH)_{14}^{10+} + 14 H^{+}		–36.8 ± 1.2	–36.8 ± 1.2	–36.8 ± 1.2
ThO_{2}(c) + 4 H^{+} ⇌ Th^{4+} + 2 H_{2}O	6.3			
ThO_{2}(am) + 4 H^{+} ⇌ Th^{4+} + 2 H_{2}O				8.8 ± 1.0
ThO_{2}(am,hyd,fresh) + 4 H^{+} ⇌ Th^{4+} + 2 H_{2}O			9.3 ± 0.9	
ThO_{2}(am,hyd,aged) + 4 H^{+} ⇌ Th^{4+} + 2 H_{2}O			8.5 ± 0.9	
Th^{4+} + 4 OH^{−} ⇌ ThO_{2}(am,hyd,fresh) + 2 H_{2}O		46.7 ± 0.9		
Th^{4+} + 4 OH^{−} ⇌ ThO_{2}(am,hyd,aged) + 2 H_{2}O		47.5 ± 0.9		

=== Thulium ===
Hydrolysis constants (log values) in critical compilations at infinite dilution and T = 298.15 K:

Reaction	Baes and Mesmer, 1976	Brown and Ekberg, 2016
Tm^{3+} + H_{2}O ⇌ TmOH^{2+} + H^{+}	−7.7	−7.34 ± 0.09
2 Tm^{3+} + 2 H_{2}O ⇌ Tm_{2}(OH)_{2}^{4+} + 2 H^{+}		−13.2 ± 0.2
3 Tm^{3+} + 5 H_{2}O ⇌ Tm_{3}(OH)_{5}^{4+} + 5 H^{+}		−30.5 ± 0.3
Tm(OH)_{3}(s) + 3 H^{+} ⇌ Tm^{3+} + 3 H_{2}O	15.0	15.56 ± 0.40

=== Tin(II) ===
Hydrolysis constants (log values) in critical compilations at infinite dilution and T = 298.15 K:

Reaction	Feitknecht, 1963	Baes and Mesmer, 1976	Hummel et al., 2002	NIST46	Cigala et al., 2012	Gamsjäger et al., 2012	Brown and Ekberg, 2016
Sn^{2+} + H_{2}O ⇌ SnOH^{+} + H^{+}		–3.40	–3.8 ± 0.2	–3.4	–3.52 ± 0.05	–3.53 ± 0.40	–3.53 ± 0.40
Sn^{2+} + 2 H_{2}O ⇌ Sn(OH)_{2} + 2 H^{+}		–7.06	–7.7 ± 0.2	–7.1	–6.26 ± 0.06	–7.68 ± 0.40	–7.68 ± 0.40
Sn^{2+} + 3 H_{2}O ⇌ Sn(OH)_{3}^{–} + 3 H^{+}		–16.61	–17.5 ± 0.2	–16.6	–16.97 ± 0.17	–17.00 ± 0.60	–17.56 ± 0.40
2 Sn^{2+} + 2 H_{2}O ⇌ Sn_{2}(OH)_{2}^{2+} + 2 H^{+}		–4.77		–4.8	–4.79 ± 0.05		
3 Sn^{2+} + 4 H_{2}O ⇌ Sn_{3}(OH)_{4}^{2+} + 4 H^{+}		–6.88	–5.6 ± 1.6	–6.88	–5.88 ± 0.05	–5.60 ± 0.47	−5.60 ± 0.47
Sn(OH)_{2}(s) ⇌ Sn^{2+} + 2 OH^{–}				–25.8	–26.28 ± 0.08		
SnO(s) + 2 H^{+} ⇌ Sn^{2+} + H_{2}O		1.76	2.5 ± 0.5				1.60 ± 0.15
SnO(s) + H_{2}O ⇌ Sn^{2+} + 2 OH^{–}	–26.2						
SnO(s) + H_{2}O ⇌ Sn(OH)_{2}	–5.3						
SnO(s) + 2 H_{2}O ⇌ Sn(OH)_{3}^{–} + H^{+}	–0.9						

=== Tin(IV) ===
Hydrolysis constants (log values) in critical compilations at infinite dilution and T = 298.15 K:

Reaction	Hummel et al., 2002	Gamsjäger et al., 2012	Brown and Ekberg, 2016
Sn^{4+} + 4 H_{2}O ⇌ Sn(OH)_{4} + 4 H^{+}			7.53 ± 0.12
Sn^{4+} + 5 H_{2}O ⇌ Sn(OH)_{5}^{–} + 5 H^{+}			–1.07 ± 0.42
Sn^{4+} + 6 H_{2}O ⇌ Sn(OH)_{6}^{2–} + 6 H^{+}			–1.07 ± 0.42
Sn(OH)_{4} + H_{2}O ⇌ Sn(OH)_{5}^{–} + H^{+}	–8.0 ± 0.3	–8.60 ± 0.40	
Sn(OH)_{4} + 2 H_{2}O ⇌ Sn(OH)_{6}^{2–} + 2 H^{+}	–18.4 ± 0.3	–18.67 ± 0.30	
SnO_{2}(cr) + 2 H_{2}O ⇌ Sn(OH)_{4}	–8.0 ± 0.2	–8.06 ± 0.11	
SnO_{2}(am) + 2 H_{2}O ⇌ Sn(OH)_{4}	–7.3 ± 0.3	–7.22 ± 0.08	
SnO_{2}(s) + 4 H^{+} ⇌ Sn^{4+} + 2 H_{2}O			–15.59 ± 0.04

=== Tungsten ===
Hydrolysis constants (log values) in critical compilations at infinite dilution and T = 298.15 K:

Reaction	NIST46
WO_{4}^{2–} + H^{+} ⇌ HWO_{4}^{–}	3.6
WO_{4}^{2–} + 2 H^{+} ⇌ H_{2}WO_{4}	5.8
6 WO_{4}^{2–} + 7 H^{+} ⇌ HW_{6}O_{21}^{5–} + 3 H_{2}O	63.83

=== Titanium(III) ===
Hydrolysis constants (log values) in critical compilations at infinite dilution and T = 298.15 K:

Reaction	Perrin et al., 1969	Baes and Mesmer, 1976	Brown and Ekberg, 2016
Ti^{3+} + H_{2}O ⇌ TiOH^{2+} + H^{+}	–1.29	–2.2	–1.65 ± 0.11
2 Ti^{3+} + 2 H_{2}O ⇌ Ti_{2}(OH)_{2}^{4+} + 2 H^{+}		–3.6	–2.64 ± 0.10

=== Titanium(IV) ===
Hydrolysis constants (log values) in critical compilations at infinite dilution and T = 298.15 K:

Reaction	Baes and Mesmer, 1976	Brown and Ekberg, 2016
Ti(OH)_{2}^{2+} + H_{2}O ⇌ Ti(OH)^{3+} + H^{+}	⩽–2.3	
Ti(OH)_{2}^{2+} + 2 H_{2}O ⇌ Ti(OH)_{4} + 2 H^{+}	–4.8	
TiO^{2+} + H_{2}O ⇌ TiOOH^{+} + H^{+}		–2.48 ± 0.10
TiO^{2+} + 2 H_{2}O ⇌ TiO(OH)_{2} + 2 H^{+}		–5.49 ± 0.14
TiO^{2+} + 3 H_{2}O ⇌ TiO(OH)_{3}^{–} + 3 H^{+}		–17.4 ± 0.5
TiO(OH)_{2} + H_{2}O ⇌ TiO(OH)_{3}^{–} + H^{+}		–11.9 ± 0.5
TiO_{2}(c) + 2 H_{2}O ⇌ Ti(OH)_{4}	~ –4.8	
TiO_{2}(s) + H^{+} ⇌ TiOOH^{+}		–6.06 ± 0.30
TiO_{2}(s) + H_{2}O ⇌ TiO(OH)_{2}		–9.02 ± 0.02
TiO_{2}(s) + 4 H^{+} ⇌ Ti^{4+} + 2 H_{2}O		–3.56 ± 0.10

=== Uranium(IV) ===
Hydrolysis constants (log values) in critical compilations at infinite dilution and T = 298.15 K:

Reaction	Baes and Mesmer, 1976	Thoenen et al., 2014	Brown and Ekberg, 2016	Grenthe et al., 2020
U^{4+} + H_{2}O ⇌ UOH^{3+} + H^{+}	–0.65	– 0.54 ± 0.06	–0.58 ± 0.08	– 0.54 ± 0.06
U^{4+} + 2 H_{2}O ⇌ U(OH)_{2}^{2+} + 2 H^{+}	(–2.6)	–1.1 ± 1.0	–1.4 ± 0.2	–1.9 ± 0.2
U^{4+} + 3 H_{2}O ⇌ U(OH)_{3}^{+} + 3 H^{+}	(–5.8)	–4.7 ± 1.0	–5.1 ± 0.3	–5.2 ± 0.4
U^{4+} + 4 H_{2}O ⇌ U(OH)_{4} + 4 H^{+}	(–10.3)	–10.0 ± 1.4	–10.4 ± 0.5	–10.0 ± 1.4
U^{4+} + 5 H_{2}O ⇌ U(OH)_{5}^{−} + 5 H^{+}	–16.0			
UO_{2}(am, hyd) + 4 H^{+} ⇌ U^{4+} + 2 H_{2}O		1.5 ± 1.0		
UO_{2}(am,hyd) + 2 H_{2}O ⇌ U^{4+} + 4 OH^{–}			–54.500 ± 1.000	–54.500 ± 1.000
UO_{2}(c) + 4 H^{+} ⇌ U^{4+} + 2 H_{2}O	–1.8			
UO_{2}(c) + 2 H_{2}O ⇌ U^{4+} + 4 OH^{–}				–60.860 ± 1.000

=== Uranium(VI) ===
Hydrolysis constants (log values) in critical compilations at infinite dilution and T = 298.15 K:

Reaction	Baes and Mesmer, 1976	Grenthe et al., 1992	NIST46	Brown and Ekberg, 2016	Grenthe et al., 2020
UO_{2}^{2+} + H_{2}O ⇌ UO_{2}(OH)^{+} + H^{+}	–5.8	–5.2 ± 0.3	–5.9 ± 0.1	–5.13 ± 0.04	–5.2_{5} ± 0.2_{4}
UO_{2}^{2+} + 2 H_{2}O ⇌ UO_{2}(OH)_{2} + 2 H^{+}		≤-10.3		–12.1_{5} ± 0.2_{0}	–12.15 ± 0.07
UO_{2}^{2+} + 3 H_{2}O ⇌ UO_{2}(OH)_{3}^{–} + 3 H^{+}		–19.2 ± 0.4		–20.2_{5} ± 0.4_{2}	–20.2_{5} ± 0.4_{2}
UO_{2}^{2+} + 4 H_{2}O ⇌ UO_{2}(OH)_{4}^{2–} + 4 H^{+}		–33 ± 2		–32.4_{0} ± 0.6_{8}	–32.4_{0} ± 0.6_{8}
2 UO_{2}^{2+} + 2 H_{2}O ⇌ (UO_{2})_{2}(OH)_{2}^{2+} + 2 H^{+}	–5.62	–5.62 ± 0.04	–5.58 ± 0.04	–5.68 ± 0.05	–5.62 ± 0.08
3 UO_{2}^{2+} + 5 H_{2}O ⇌ (UO_{2})_{3}(OH)_{5}^{+} + 5 H^{+}	–15.63	–15.5_{5} ± 0.1_{2}	–15.6	–15.7_{5} ± 0.1_{2}	–15.5_{5} ± 0.1_{2}
3 UO_{2}^{2+} + 4 H_{2}O ⇌ (UO_{2})_{3}(OH)_{4}^{2+} + 4 H^{+}	(–11.75)	–11.9 ± 0.3		–11.78 ± 0.05	–11.9 ± 0.3
3 UO_{2}^{2+} + 7 H_{2}O ⇌ (UO_{2})_{3}(OH)_{7}^{–} + 7 H^{+}		–31 ± 2.0		–32.2 ± 0.8	–32.2 ± 0.8
4 UO_{2}^{2+} + 7 H_{2}O ⇌ (UO_{2})_{4}(OH)_{7}+ + 7 H^{+}		–21.9 ± 1.0		–22.1 ± 0.2	–21.9 ± 1.0
2 UO_{2}^{2+} + H_{2}O ⇌ (UO_{2})_{2}(OH)^{3+} + H^{+}		–2.7 ± 1.0			–2.7 ± 1.0
UO_{2}(OH)_{2}(s) + 2 H^{+} ⇌ UO_{2}^{2+} + 2 H_{2}O	5.6		6.0	4.81 ± 0.20	
UO_{3}·2H_{2}O(cr) + 2 H^{+} ⇌ UO_{2}^{2+} + 3 H_{2}O					5.350 ± 0.130

=== Vanadium(IV) ===
Hydrolysis constants (log values) in critical compilations at infinite dilution and T = 298.15 K:

Reaction	Brown and Ekberg, 2016
VO^{2+} + H_{2}O ⇌ VO(OH)^{+} + H^{+}	–5.30 ± 0.13
2 VO^{2+} + 2 H_{2}O ⇌ (VO)_{2}(OH)_{2}^{2+} + 2 H^{+}	–6.71 ± 0.10

=== Vanadium(V) ===
Hydrolysis constants (log values) in critical compilations at infinite dilution and T = 298.15 K:

Reaction	Baes and Mesmer, 1976	Brown and Ekberg, 2016
VO_{2}^{+} + 2 H_{2}O ⇌ VO(OH_{)3} + H^{+}	–3.3	
VO_{2}^{+} + 2 H_{2}O ⇌ VO_{2}(OH)_{2}^{–} + 2 H^{+}	–7.3	–7.18 ± 0.12
10 VO_{2}^{+} + 8 H_{2}O ⇌ V_{10}O_{26}(OH)_{2}^{4–} + 14 H^{+}	–10.7	
VO_{2}(OH)_{2}^{–} ⇌ VO_{3}(OH)^{2–} + H^{+}	–8.55	
2 VO_{2}(OH)_{2}^{–} ⇌ V_{2}O_{6}(OH)_{2}^{3–} + H^{+} + H_{2}O	–6.53	
VO_{3}(OH)^{2–} ⇌ VO_{4}^{3–} + H^{+}	–14.26	
2 VO_{3}(OH)^{2–} ⇌ V_{2}O_{7}^{4–} + H_{2}O	0.56	
3 VO_{3}(OH)^{2–} + 3 H^{+}⇌ V_{3}O_{9}^{3–} + 3 H_{2}O	31.81	
V_{10}O_{26}(OH)_{2}^{4–} ⇌ V_{10}O_{27}(OH)^{5–} + 3 H^{+}	–3.6	
V_{10}O_{27}(OH)^{5–} ⇌ V_{10}O_{28}^{6–} + H^{+}	–6.15	
VO_{2}^{+} + H_{2}O ⇌ VO_{2}OH + H^{+}		–3.25 ± 0.1
VO_{2}^{+} + 3 H_{2}O ⇌ VO_{2}(OH)_{3}^{2-} + 3 H^{+}		–15.74 ± 0.19
VO_{2}^{+} + 4 H_{2}O ⇌ VO_{2}(OH)_{4}^{3-} + 4 H^{+}		–30.03 ± 0.24
2 VO_{2}^{+} + 4 H_{2}O ⇌ (VO_{2})_{2}(OH)_{4}^{2-} + 4 H^{+}		–11.66 ± 0.53
2 VO_{2}^{+} + 5 H_{2}O ⇌ (VO_{2})_{2}(OH)_{5}^{3-} + 5 H^{+}		–20.91 ± 0.22
2 VO_{2}^{+} + 6 H_{2}O ⇌ (VO_{2})_{2}(OH)_{6}^{4-} + 6 H^{+}		–32.43 ± 0.30
4 VO_{2}^{+} + 8 H_{2}O ⇌ (VO_{2})_{4}(OH)8^{4-} + 8 H^{+}		–20.78 ± 0.33
4 VO_{2}^{+} + 9 H_{2}O ⇌ (VO_{2})_{4}(OH)_{9}^{5-} + 9 H^{+}		–31.85 ± 0.26
4 VO_{2}^{+} + 10 H_{2}O ⇌ (VO_{2})_{4}(OH)_{10}^{6-} + 10 H^{+}		–45.85 ± 0.26
5 VO_{2}^{+} + 10 H_{2}O ⇌ (VO_{2})_{5}(OH)_{10}^{5-} + 10 H^{+}		–27.02 ± 0.34
10 VO_{2}^{+} + 14 H_{2}O ⇌ (VO_{2})_{10}(OH)_{14}^{4-} + 14 H^{+}		–10.5 ± 0.3
10 VO_{2}^{+} + 15 H_{2}O ⇌ (VO_{2})_{10}(OH)_{15}^{5-} + 15 H^{+}		–15.73 ± 0.33
10 VO_{2}^{+} + 16 H_{2}O ⇌ (VO_{2})_{10}(OH)_{16}^{6-} + 16 H^{+}		–23.90 ± 0.35
1/2 V_{2}O_{5}(c) + H^{+} ⇌ VO_{2}^{+} + 1/2 H_{2}O	–0.66	
V_{2}O_{5}(s) + 2 H^{+} ⇌ 2 VO_{2}^{+} + H_{2}O		–0.64 ± 0.09

=== Ytterbium ===
Hydrolysis constants (log values) in critical compilations at infinite dilution and T = 298.15 K:

Reaction	Baes and Mesmer, 1976	Brown and Ekberg, 2016
Yb^{3+} + H_{2}O ⇌ YbOH^{2+} + H^{+}	−7.7	−7.31 ± 0.18
Yb^{3+} + 2 H_{2}O ⇌ Yb(OH)_{2}^{+} + 2 H^{+}	(−15.8)	
Yb^{3+} + 3 H_{2}O ⇌ Yb(OH)_{3} + 3 H^{+}	(−24.1)	
Yb^{3+} + 4 H_{2}O ⇌ Yb(OH)_{4}^{−} + 4 H^{+}	−32.7	
2 Yb^{3+} + 2 H_{2}O ⇌ Yb_{2}(OH)_{2}^{4+} + 2 H^{+}		−13.76 ± 0.20
3 Yb^{3+} + 5 H_{2}O ⇌ Yb_{3}(OH)_{5}^{4+} + 5 H^{+}		−30.6 ± 0.3
Yb(OH)_{3}(s) + 3 H^{+} ⇌ Yb^{3+} + 3 H_{2}O	14.7	15.35 ± 0.20

=== Yttrium ===
Hydrolysis constants (log values) in critical compilations at infinite dilution and T = 298.15 K:

Reaction	Baes and Mesmer, 1976	Brown and Ekberg, 2016
Y^{3+} + H_{2}O ⇌ YOH^{2+} + H^{+}	–7.7	–7.77 ± 0.06
Y^{3+} + 2 H_{2}O ⇌ Y(OH)_{2}^{+} + 2 H^{+}	(–16.4) [Estimation]	
Y^{3+} + 3 H_{2}O ⇌ Y(OH)_{3} + 3 H^{+}	(–26.0) [Estimation]	
Y^{3+} + 4 H_{2}O ⇌ Y(OH)_{4}^{−}+ 4 H^{+}	–36.5	
2 Y^{3+} + 2 H_{2}O ⇌ Y_{2}(OH)_{2}^{4+} + 2 H^{+}	–14.23	–14.1 ± 0.2
3 Y^{3+} + 5 H_{2}O ⇌ Y_{3}(OH)_{5}^{4+} + 5 H^{+}	–31.6	–32.7 ± 0.3
Y(OH)_{3}(s) + 3 H^{+} ⇌ Y^{3+} + 3 H_{2}O	17.5	17.32 ± 0.30

=== Zinc ===
Hydrolysis constants (log values) in critical compilations at infinite dilution and T = 298.15 K:

Reaction	Baes and Mesmer, 1976	Powell and Brown, 2013	Brown and Ekberg, 2016
Zn^{2+} + H_{2}O ⇌ ZnOH^{+} + H^{+}	−8.96	−8.96 ± 0.05	−8.94 ± 0.06
Zn^{2+} + 2 H_{2}O ⇌ Zn(OH)_{2} + 2 H^{+}	−16.9	–17.82 ± 0.08	−17.89 ± 0.15
Zn^{2+} + 3 H_{2}O ⇌ Zn(OH)_{3}^{−} + 3 H^{+}	−28.4	–28.05 ± 0.05	−27.98 ± 0.10
Zn^{2+} + 4 H_{2}O ⇌ Zn(OH)_{4}^{2-} + 4 H^{+}	−41.2	–40.41 ± 0.12	−40.35 ± 0.22
2 Zn^{2+} + H_{2}O ⇌ Zn_{2}OH^{3+} + H^{+}	−9.0	–7.9 ± 0.2	−7.89 ± 0.31
2 Zn^{2+} + 6 H_{2}O ⇌ Zn_{2}(OH)_{6}^{2-} + 6 H^{+}	−57.8		
ZnO(s) + 2 H^{+} ⇌ Zn^{2+} + H_{2}O	11.14	11.12 ± 0.05	11.11 ± 0.10
ε-Zn(OH)_{2}(s) + 2 H^{+} ⇌ Zn^{2+} + 2 H_{2}O		11.38 ± 0.20	11.38 ± 0.20
β_{1}-Zn(OH)_{2}(s) + 2 H^{+} ⇌ Zn^{2+} + 2 H_{2}O		11.72 ± 0.04	
β_{2}-Zn(OH)_{2}(s) + 2 H^{+} ⇌ Zn^{2}+ + 2 H_{2}O		11.76 ± 0.04	
γ-Zn(OH)_{2}(s) + 2 H^{+} ⇌ Zn^{2+} + 2 H_{2}O		11.70 ± 0.04	
δ-Zn(OH)_{2}(s) + 2 H^{+} ⇌ Zn^{2+} + 2 H_{2}O		11.81 ± 0.04	

=== Zirconium ===
Hydrolysis constants (log values) in critical compilations at infinite dilution and T = 298.15 K:

Reaction	Baes and Mesmer, 1976	Thoenen et al., 2014	Brown and Ekberg, 2016
Zr^{4+} + H_{2}O ⇌ ZrOH^{3+} + H^{+}	0.32	0.32 ± 0.22	0.12 ± 0.12
Zr^{4+} + 2 H_{2}O ⇌ Zr(OH)_{2}^{2+} + 2 H^{+}	(−1.7)*	0.98 ± 1.06*	−0.18 ± 0.17*
Zr^{4+} + 3 H_{2}O ⇌ Zr(OH)_{3}^{+} + 3 H^{+}	(−5.1)		
Zr^{4+} + 4 H_{2}O ⇌ Zr(OH)_{4} + 4 H^{+}	–9.7*	–2.19 ± 0.70*	−4.53 ± 0.37*
Zr^{4+} + 5 H_{2}O ⇌ Zr(OH)_{5}^{–} + 5 H^{+}	–16.0		
Zr^{4+} + 6 H_{2}O ⇌ Zr(OH)_{6}^{2–} + 6 H^{+}		–29 ± 0.70	–30.5 ± 0.3
3 Zr^{4+} + 4 H_{2}O ⇌ Zr_{3}(OH)_{4}^{8+} + 4 H^{+}	–0.6	0.4 ± 0.3	0.90 ± 0.18
3 Zr^{4+} + 5 H_{2}O ⇌ Zr_{3}(OH)_{5}^{7+} + 5 H^{+}	3.70		
3 Zr^{4+} + 9 H_{2}O ⇌ Zr_{3}(OH)_{9}^{3+} + 9 H^{+}		12.19 ± 0.20	12.19 ± 0.20
4 Zr^{4+} + 8 H_{2}O ⇌ Zr_{4}(OH)_{8}^{8+} + 8 H^{+}	6.0	6.52 ± 0.05	6.52 ± 0.05
4 Zr^{4+} + 15 H_{2}O ⇌ Zr_{4}(OH)_{15}^{+} + 15 H^{+}		12.58 ± 0.24	
4 Zr^{4+} + 16 H_{2}O ⇌ Zr_{4}(OH)_{16} + 16 H^{+}		8.39 ± 0.80	
ZrO_{2}(s) + 4 H^{+} ⇌ Zr^{4+} + 2 H_{2}O	–1.9*		–5.37 ± 0.42*
ZrO_{2}(s,baddeleyite) + 4 H^{+} ⇌ Zr^{4+} + 2 H_{2}O		–7 ± 1.6	
ZrO_{2}(am) + 4 H^{+} ⇌ Zr^{4+} + 2 H_{2}O		–3.24 ± 0.10	–2.97 ± 0.18

*Errors in compilations concerning equilibrium and/or data elaboration. Data not recommended. It is strongly suggested to refer to the original papers.
