= Hydrolysis =

Cleavage of chemical bonds by the addition of water

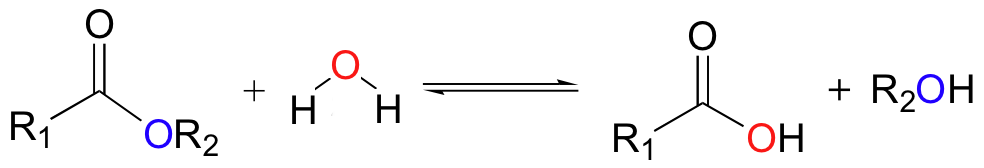
Generic hydrolysis reaction. (The 2-way yield symbol indicates a chemical equilibrium in which hydrolysis and condensation are reversible.)

Hydrolysis (/haɪˈdrɒlɪsɪs/; from Ancient Greek hydro- 'water' and lysis 'to unbind') is any chemical reaction in which a molecule of water breaks one or more chemical bonds. The term is used broadly for substitution and elimination reactions in which water is the nucleophile.

Biological hydrolysis is the cleavage of biomolecules where a water molecule is consumed to effect the separation of a larger molecule into component parts. When a carbohydrate is broken into its component sugar molecules by hydrolysis (e.g., sucrose being broken down into glucose and fructose), this is recognized as saccharification.

Hydrolysis reactions can be the reverse of dehydration synthesis (a specific type of condensation reaction) in which two molecules join into a larger one and eject a water molecule. Thus hydrolysis adds water to break down molecules, whereas condensation joins molecules through the removal of water.

== Types ==
Hydrolysis is a chemical process in which a molecule of water is added to a substance, causing both the substance and water molecule to split into two parts. In such reactions, a chemical bond is broken, with one fragment of the target molecule (or parent molecule) gaining a hydrogen ion, and the other gaining a hydroxide. In living systems, most biochemical reactions (including ATP hydrolysis) take place during the catalysis of enzymes. The catalytic action of enzymes allows for the hydrolysis of proteins, fats, oils, and carbohydrates.

=== Esters and amides ===
Ester and amide hydrolysis occurs through nucleophilic acyl substitution where water acts as a nucleophile (a nucleus-seeking agent, e.g., water or hydroxyl ion), attacking the carbon of the carbonyl group of the ester or amide. Under acidic conditions, the carbonyl group is activated via protonation, allowing for direct nucleophilic attack by water. In an aqueous base, hydroxyl ions are better nucleophiles than polar molecules such as water due to the negative charge localized on the oxygen and therefore directly attack the carbonyl group.

Upon hydrolysis, an ester is converted into a carboxylic acid plus an alcohol, while an amide converts into a carboxylic acid and an amine or ammonia (which in the presence of acid are immediately converted to ammonium salts). One of the two oxygen groups on the carboxylic acid are derived from a water molecule and the amine/ammonia or alcohol gains the hydrogen ion.

Perhaps the oldest commercially practiced example of ester hydrolysis is saponification (formation of soap). It is the hydrolysis of a triglyceride (fat) with an aqueous base such as sodium hydroxide (NaOH). During the process, glycerol is formed, and the fatty acids react with the base, converting them to salts. These salts are called soaps, commonly used in households. Under biological conditions, this reaction is catalyzed by lipases for the digestion of fats, acting when adsorbed to an oil-water interface. Other esterases function in water, serving a variety of biological functions.

A key biological application of amide hydrolysis is the digestion of proteins into amino acids. Proteases, enzymes that aid digestion by causing hydrolysis of peptide bonds in proteins, catalyze the hydrolysis of peptide bonds in peptide chains, releasing polypeptide fragments two to six amino acids long. Those fragments are then broken down into single amino acids via carboxypeptidases secreted by the pancreas.

However, proteases do not catalyze the hydrolysis of all kinds of proteins. Their action is stereo-selective: Only proteins with a certain tertiary structure are targeted as some kind of orienting force is needed to place the amide group in the proper position for catalysis. The necessary contacts between an enzyme and its substrates (proteins) are created because the enzyme folds in such a way as to form a crevice into which the substrate fits; the crevice also contains the catalytic groups. Therefore, proteins that do not fit into the crevice will not undergo hydrolysis. This specificity preserves the integrity of other proteins such as hormones, and therefore the biological system continues to function normally.

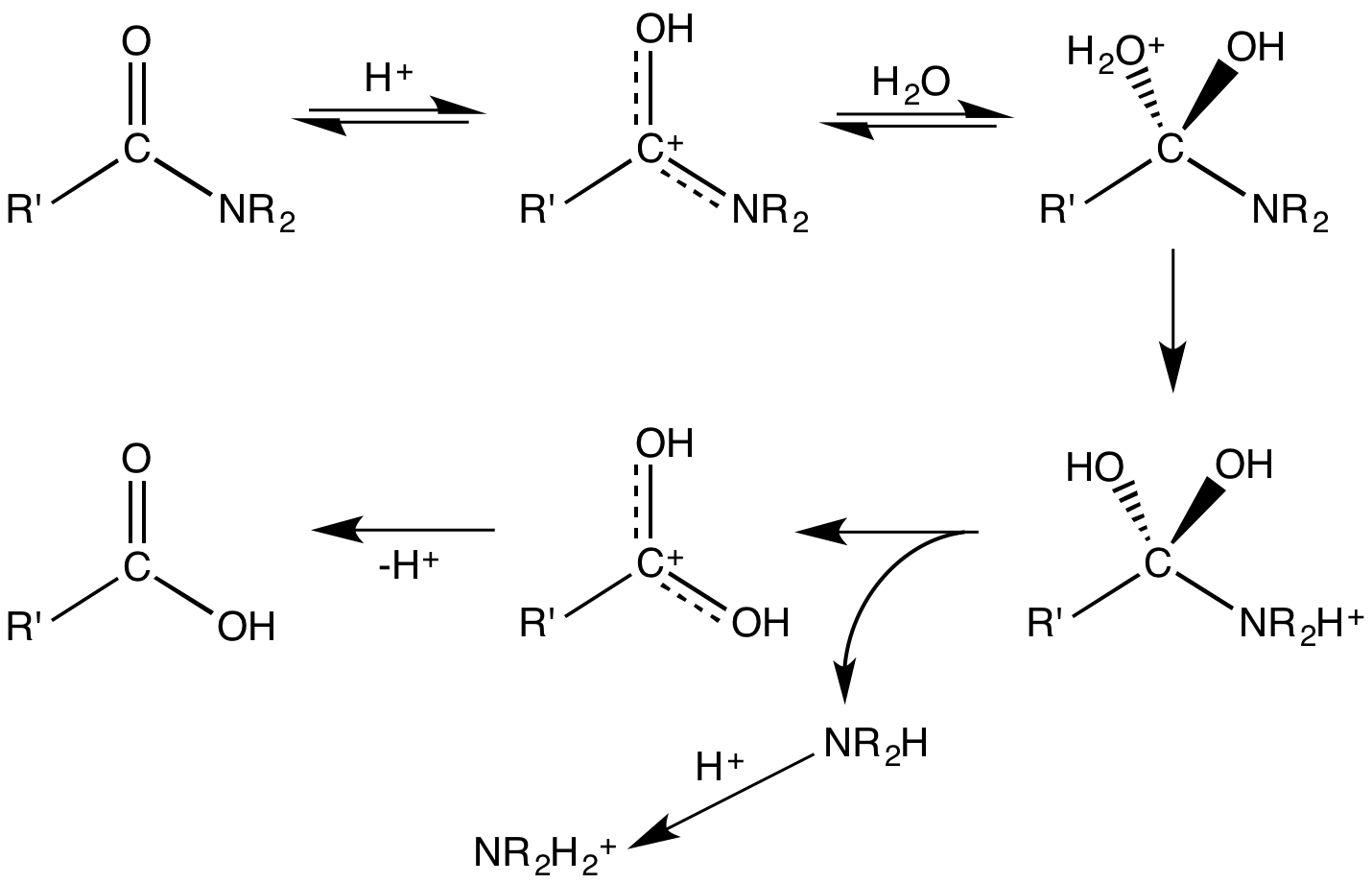
Mechanism for acid-catalyzed hydrolysis of an amide.

Many polyamide polymers such as nylon 6,6 hydrolyze in the presence of strong acids. The process leads to depolymerization. For this reason, nylon products fail by fracturing when exposed to small amounts of acidic water. Polyesters are also susceptible to similar polymer degradation reactions. The problem is known as environmental stress cracking.

=== ATP ===
Hydrolysis is related to energy metabolism and storage. All living cells require a continual supply of energy for two main purposes: the biosynthesis of micro and macromolecules, and the active transport of ions and molecules across cell membranes. The energy derived from the oxidation of nutrients is not used directly but, by means of a complex and long sequence of reactions, it is channeled into a special energy-storage molecule, adenosine triphosphate (ATP). The ATP molecule contains pyrophosphate linkages (bonds formed when two phosphate units are combined) that release energy when needed. ATP can undergo hydrolysis in two ways: Firstly, the removal of terminal phosphate to form adenosine diphosphate (ADP) and inorganic phosphate, with the reaction:

ATP + H_{2}O → ADP + P_{i}

Secondly, the removal of a terminal diphosphate to yield adenosine monophosphate (AMP) and pyrophosphate. The latter usually undergoes further cleavage into its two constituent phosphates. This results in biosynthesis reactions, which usually occur in chains, that can be driven in the direction of synthesis when the phosphate bonds have undergone hydrolysis.

=== Polysaccharides ===
Sucrose. The glycoside bond is represented by the central oxygen atom, which holds the two monosaccharide units together.

Monosaccharides can be linked together by glycosidic bonds, which can be cleaved by hydrolysis. Two, three, several or many monosaccharides thus linked form disaccharides, trisaccharides, oligosaccharides, or polysaccharides, respectively. Enzymes that hydrolyze glycosidic bonds are called "glycoside hydrolases" or "glycosidases".

The best-known disaccharide is sucrose (table sugar). Hydrolysis of sucrose yields glucose and fructose. Invertase is a sucrase used industrially for the hydrolysis of sucrose to so-called invert sugar. Lactase is essential for digestive hydrolysis of lactose in milk; many adult humans do not produce lactase and cannot digest the lactose in milk.

The hydrolysis of polysaccharides to soluble sugars can be recognized as saccharification. Malt made from barley is used as a source of β-amylase to break down starch into the disaccharide maltose, which can be used by yeast to produce beer. Other amylase enzymes may convert starch to glucose or to oligosaccharides. Cellulose is first hydrolyzed to cellobiose by cellulase and then cellobiose is further hydrolyzed to glucose by beta-glucosidase. Ruminants such as cows are able to hydrolyze cellulose into cellobiose and then glucose because of symbiotic bacteria that produce cellulases.

=== DNA ===
Hydrolysis of DNA occurs at a significant rate in vivo. For example, it is estimated that in each human cell 2,000 to 10,000 DNA purine bases turn over every day due to hydrolytic depurination, and that this is largely counteracted by specific rapid DNA repair processes. Hydrolytic DNA damages that fail to be accurately repaired may contribute to carcinogenesis and ageing.

=== Metal aqua ions ===
Metal ions are Lewis acids, and in aqueous solution they form metal aquo complexes of the general formula M(H_{2}O)_{n}^{m+}. The aqua ions undergo hydrolysis, to a greater or lesser extent. The first hydrolysis step is given generically as

M(H_{2}O)_{n}^{m+} + H_{2}O ⇌ M(H_{2}O)_{n−1}(OH)^{(m−1)+} + H_{3}O^{+}

Thus the aqua cations behave as acids in terms of Brønsted–Lowry acid–base theory. This effect is easily explained by considering the inductive effect of the positively charged metal ion, which weakens the O−H bond of an attached water molecule, making the liberation of a proton relatively easy.

The dissociation constant, pK_{a}, for this reaction is more or less linearly related to the charge-to-size ratio of the metal ion. Ions with low charges, such as Na^{+} are very weak acids with almost imperceptible hydrolysis. Large divalent ions such as Ca^{2+}, Zn^{2+}, Sn^{2+} and Pb^{2+} have a pK_{a} of 6 or more and would not normally be classed as acids, but small divalent ions such as Be^{2+} undergo extensive hydrolysis. Trivalent ions like Al^{3+} and Fe^{3+} are weak acids whose pK_{a} is comparable to that of acetic acid. Solutions of salts such as BeCl_{2} or Al(NO_{3})_{3} in water are noticeably acidic; the hydrolysis can be suppressed by adding an acid such as nitric acid, making the solution more acidic.

Hydrolysis may proceed beyond the first step, often with the formation of polynuclear species via the process of olation. Some "exotic" species such as Sn_{3}(OH)^{2+}_{4} are well characterized. Hydrolysis tends to proceed as pH rises leading, in many cases, to the precipitation of a hydroxide such as Al(OH)_{3} or AlO(OH). These substances, major constituents of bauxite, are known as laterites and are formed by leaching from rocks of most of the ions other than aluminium and iron and subsequent hydrolysis of the remaining aluminium and iron.

=== Mechanism strategies ===
Acetals, imines, and enamines can be converted back into ketones by treatment with excess water under acid-catalyzed conditions: RO·OR−H_{3}O−O; NR·H_{3}O−O; RNR−H_{3}O−O.

== Catalysis ==
=== Acid hydrolysis ===
Acid catalysis can be applied to hydrolyses. For example, in the conversion of cellulose or starch to glucose. Carboxylic acids can be produced from acid hydrolysis of esters.

Acids catalyze hydrolysis of nitriles to amides. Acid hydrolysis does not usually refer to the acid catalyzed addition of the elements of water to double or triple bonds by electrophilic addition as may originate from a hydration reaction. Acid hydrolysis is used to prepare monosaccharides with the help of mineral acids but formic acid and trifluoroacetic acid have been used.

Acid hydrolysis can be utilized in the pretreatment of cellulosic material, so as to cut the interchain linkages in hemicellulose and cellulose.

=== Alkaline hydrolysis ===
Alkaline hydrolysis usually refers to types of nucleophilic substitution reactions in which the attacking nucleophile is a hydroxide ion. The best known type is saponification: cleaving esters into carboxylate salts and alcohols. In ester hydrolysis, the hydroxide ion nucleophile attacks the carbonyl carbon. This mechanism is supported by isotope labeling experiments. For example, when ethyl propionate with an oxygen-18 labeled ethoxy group is treated with sodium hydroxide (NaOH), the oxygen-18 is completely absent from the sodium propionate product and is found exclusively in the ethanol formed.

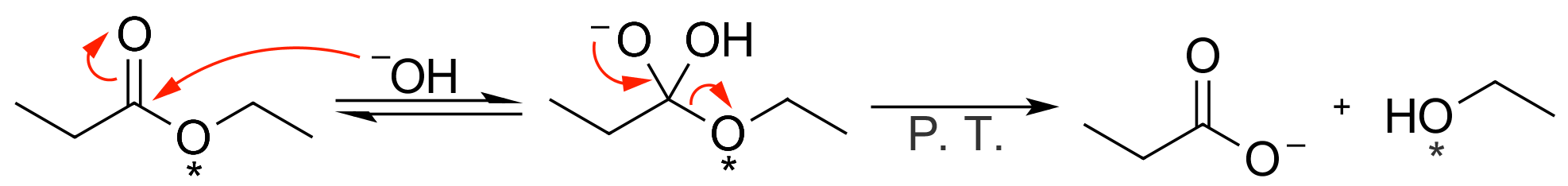

The reaction is often used to solubilize solid organic matter. Chemical drain cleaners take advantage of this method to dissolve hair and fat in pipes. The reaction is also used to dispose of human and other animal remains as an alternative to traditional burial or cremation.

== Supercritical hydrolysis ==
Supercritical hydrolysis is a chemical engineering process in which water in the supercritical state can be employed to achieve a variety of reactions within seconds. To cope with the extremely short times of reaction on an industrial scale, the process should be continuous. This continuity enables the ratio of the amount of water to the other reactants to be less than unity which minimizes the energy needed to heat the water above 374 °C (705 °F), the critical temperature. Application of the process to biomass provides simple sugars in near quantitative yield by supercritical hydrolysis of the constituent polysaccharides. The phenolic polymer components of the biomass, usually exemplified by lignins, are converted into a water-insoluble liquid mixture of low molecular phenols (monomerization).

A private company, Renmatix, based in King of Prussia, Pennsylvania, has developed a supercritical hydrolysis technology to convert a range of non-food biomass feedstocks into cellulosic sugars for application in biochemicals and biofuels. It has a demonstration facility in Georgia, currently capable of processing three dry tons of hardwood biomass into cellulosic sugar daily. In Australia, a government-sponsored entity called Licella, is similarly transforming sawdust. Both processes require high ratios of water to the amount of feedstock. This energy profligacy can be avoided by the use of a plastic-type extruder through which the solid, but wet, biomass is conveyed to a small inductively heated reaction zone as shown by Xtrudx Technologies Inc of Seattle.

Supercritical hydrolysis can be considered a broadly applicable green chemistry process that utilizes water simultaneously as a heat transfer agent, a solvent, a reactant, a source of hydrogen and as a char-reduction component.

== See also ==
- Adenosine triphosphate
- Water cremation
- Catabolism
- Condensation reaction
- Dehydration reaction
- Hydrolysis constant
- Inhibitor protein
- Polymer degradation
- Proteolysis
- Saponification
- Sol–gel polymerisation
- Solvolysis
- Thermal hydrolysis
