= Cellulosic sugars =

Cellulosic sugars are derived from non-food biomass (e.g. wood, agricultural residues, municipal solid waste). The biomass is primarily composed of carbohydrate polymers cellulose, hemicellulose, and an aromatic polymer (lignin). The hemicellulose is a polymer of mainly five-carbon sugars C_{5}H_{10}O_{5} (xylose). and the cellulose is a polymer of six-carbon sugar C_{6}H_{12}O_{6} (glucose). Cellulose fibers are considered to be a plant’s structural building blocks and are tightly bound to lignin, but the biomass can be deconstructed using Acid hydrolysis, enzymatic hydrolysis, organosolv dissolution, autohydrolysis or supercritical hydrolysis. A more recent mechanical method offers hope that at last, a more economic and waste free method has been found although it is still to scale and is not yet commercial.

Biomass (cellulose, hemicellulose and lignocellulose) contain vast amounts of fermentable sugars. These sugars may be produced from a wide variety of feedstocks and can be converted into a multitude of biochemical, biofuel, and polymer products by either biological, mechanical or chemical routes.

== Industrial use ==
In January 2012, BASF invested in Pennsylvania-based Renmatix to produce low-cost, large volume quantities of industrial sugar from lignocellulosic biomass (wood, cane bagasse or straw). Renmatix is currently the only commercial player utilizing supercritical hydrolysis as a route to cellulosic sugar production.

Renmatix is working with multiple partners on development of commercial scale facilities with the capability to produce more than 100,000 tons of cellulosic sugars annually. The company has a technical center in Pennsylvania and production operations at the Integrated Plantrose Complex (IPC) in Kennesaw, Georgia and the Feedstock Processing Facility (FPF) in Rome, New York.

In June 2013, Renmatix also entered a joint development agreement (JDA) with UPM, a Finnish pulp, paper and timber manufacturer, to convert woody biomass into low-cost sugar intermediates for subsequent downstream processing into biochemicals.

In December 2013, Renmatix and Virent announced a strategic collaboration to convert affordable cellulosic sugars to renewable chemicals and bio-based packaging materials.

In March 2015, French Energy Group, Total S.A. entered a joint development agreement (JDA) with Renmatix to use the Plantrose technology to extract second-generation sugars from biomass and develop sustainable and profitable biomolecules for products of interest.

Biotechnology Penetration in the Chemical Industry

| Year | Value | Penetration |
|---|---|---|
| 2000 (actual) | $67 billion | 5.3% |
| 2005 (actual) | $98 billion | 6.7% |
| 2010 (forecast) | $159 billion | 9.6% |
| 2025 (projection) | $1000 billion | 33% |

World Biobased Market Penetration 2010-2025

| Chemical Sector | 2010 | 2015 |
|---|---|---|
| Commodity Chemicals | 1-2% | 6-10% |
| Specialty Chemicals | 20-25% | 45-50% |
| Fine Chemicals | 20-25% | 45-50% |
| Polymers | 5-10% | 10-20% |

== Applications ==
Cellulosic sugars are used as renewable resources for biochemical and biofuels industries and can be used to produce intermediates by fermentative processes. The availability of industrial sugars from renewable resources, in sufficient quantities and at a favorable cost enables the products to be cost-competitive to fossil fuel based products.

A 2012 study by Nexant estimates that in the future, it will be possible and potentially economically viable to produce any type of sugar-based chemical product from biomass due to developments in cellulosic processing.
