= John I. Pitt =

Australian mycologist (1937–2022)

John Ingram Pitt (13 March 1937 – 23 March 2022) was an Australian mycologist, known as a leading expert on the role of fungi in food spoilage. He gained an international reputation as a pioneering researcher on the ecology of spoilage molds in extreme environments.

== Education and career ==
John Ingram Pitt was born and grew up on a small farm near Wamberal, New South Wales. After attending Gosford High School, he moved to Sydney. In 1954, he became an employee of the Australian Government's Commonwealth Scientific and Industrial Research Organisation (CSIRO). He began at CSIRO as a Technical Assistant Grade 1 (Junior), and was appointed a Chief Research Scientist in 1992 at the age of 55. At the time of his death in 2022, he was the only CSIRO employee in its history to start at the lowest research employment grade and to go through all of the research grades up to the highest level. He retired from CSIRO in 2002.

After joining CSIRO in 1954, he became a part-time student at the University of New South Wales (UNSW), where he studied food technology. At UNSW he completed a seven-year course of study in eight years, followed by an M.Sc. qualifying course, and then a part-time M.Sc. program. His 1965 M.Sc. thesis is entitled Microbiological Problems in Prune Preservation. On leave of absence from CSIRO, he became in 1965 a graduate student at the University of California, Davis. He graduated there with a Ph.D. in 1968. His Ph.D. thesis (on the taxonomy of Metschnikowia) is entitled "The yeast genus Metschnikowia". His thesis advisor was Martin Wesley Miller (1925–2005) in the UC Davis department of food science and technology. After completing his Ph.D., Pitt spent a postdoctoral year at the USDA's Northern Regional Research Laboratory (NRRL), where his supervisor was Clifford William Hesseltine (1917–1999). At the USDA Pitt studied Penicillium taxonomy and mycotoxin occurrences in food chains. When his postdoctoral fellowship ended, he returned to CSIRO and collaborated with John H. B. Christian.

Michael Vincent Tracey, who was the Chief of the CSIRO Division of Food Research from 1967 to 1978, asked Pitt to systematically monitor the mycotoxins threatening food safety. Pitt used many fungal cultures obtained from NRRL during his postdoctoral fellowship to establish a yeast and mold collection at CSIRO, which by the year 2021 had about 6000 specimens. The fungal collection is officially known as the FRR culture collection and is of major importance in food and industrial applications. The FRR culture collection includes Penicillium and Aspergillus species and their related teleomorphs. The collection also contains xerophilic fungi. The collection is the basis for Pitt's book The Genus Penicillium and its teleomorphic States Eupenicillium and Talaromyces (Academic Press, 1980) and the book Fungi and Food Spoilage (Academic Press, 1985), coauthored by Ailsa Diane Hocking. The book extensively describes fungal species that cause spoilage of fruits and vegetables.

From the 1970s to 1990s, Pitt and Hocking did pioneer research on methods for isolating and identifying foodborne fungi, as well as their physiology and ecology. The main focus of the research was on xerophilic fungi. Pitt and Hocking did research for the Australian Centre for International Agricultural Research (ACIAR) on the fungi and mycotoxins that occur in food commodities from Indonesia and Southeast Asia. Pitt became a leading authority on mycotoxins. In the 1980s he investigated the role of the environment in problems with aflatoxin in peanuts grown in Australia. He pioneered biocontrol by competitive exclusion (replacing toxigenic fungal strains by non-toxigenic fungal strains) to control aflatoxin formation in peanuts and maize. In 1986, Pitt and three collaborators discovered the species Aspergillus pisci (first named Polypaecilum pisce).

== Publications ==
Pitt was the author or coauthor of many papers related to the ecology of molds that cause food spoilage. He, with his frequent collaborator Ailsa D. Hocking, researched ways to prevent food spoilage caused by the fungal genera Aspergillus, Penicillium, and Cladosporium, along with the yeast species Zygosaccharomyces bailii

Pitt was the author, coauthor, editor, or co-editor of 20 books and the author or coauthor of about 250 research papers or book chapters. In 2019 Pitt's Google Scholar h-index exceeded 60.

== Awards ==
Pitt was honored with three Honorary Life Memberships: from the Australian Society for Microbiology in 2000, from the Mycological Society of America in 2001, and from the British Mycological Society in 2003. He won several awards, most notably the Commonwealth of Australia's Centenary Medal with citation for "services to food science and technology".

== Selected publications ==
=== Articles ===
- Pitt, J. I.; Christian, J. H. B. (1968). "Water Relations of Xerophilic Fungi Isolated from Prunes". Applied Microbiology. 16 (12): 1853–1858. doi:10.1128/am.16.12.1853-1858.1968. PMC 547783. PMID 16349827.
- Pitt, J.I.; Hocking, Ailsa D.; Glenn, Diane R. (1983). "An improved medium for the detection of Aspergillus flavus and A. parasiticus". Journal of Applied Bacteriology. 54 (1): 109–114. doi:10.1111/j.1365-2672.1983.tb01307.x. PMID 6406419.
- Klich, M.A.; Pitt, J.I. (1988). "Differentiation of Aspergillus flavus from A. parasiticus and other closely related species". Transactions of the British Mycological Society. 91: 99–108. doi:10.1016/S0007-1536(88)80010-X.
- Pitt, J.I.; Hocking, Ailsa D.; Bhudhasamai, Kanjana; Miscamble, Beverly F.; Wheeler, Kathryn A.; Tanboon-Ek, P. (1993). "The normal mycoflora of commodities from Thailand. 1. Nuts and oilseeds". International Journal of Food Microbiology. 20 (4): 211–226. doi:10.1016/0168-1605(93)90166-E. PMID 8110599.
- Pitt, J.I.; Hocking, Ailsa D.; Bhudhasamai, Kanjana; Miscamble, Beverly F.; Wheeler, Kathryn A.; Tanboon-Ek, P. (1994). "The normal mycoflora of commodities from Thailand. 2. Beans, rice, small grains and other commodities". International Journal of Food Microbiology. 23 (1): 35–53. doi:10.1016/0168-1605(94)90220-8. PMID 7811571.
- Pitt, J.I. (1994). "The current role of Aspergillus and Penicilliumin human and animal health". Medical Mycology. 32: 17–32. doi:10.1080/02681219480000701.
- Highley, E.; Johnson, G.I., eds. (1996). "Current knowledge of fungi and mycotoxins associated with food commodities in Southeast Asia by J. I. Pitt and Ailsa D. Hocking". Mycotoxin contamination in grains. Papers presented at the 17th ASEAN Technical Seminar on Grain Postharvest Technology, Lumut, Malaysia, 25-27 July 1995. ACIAR Technical Reports No. 37. Canberra: Australian Centre for International Research. pp. 5–10. ISBN 1-86320-171-8; 145 pages
- Pitt, J. I.; Basílico, J. C.; Abarca, M. L.; López, C. (2000). "Mycotoxins and toxigenic fungi". Medical Mycology. 38: 41–46. doi:10.1080/mmy.38.s1.41.46. PMID 11204163.
- Pitt, J. I. (2000). "Toxigenic fungi: Which are important?". Medical Mycology. 38: 17–22. doi:10.1080/mmy.38.s1.17.22. PMID 11204142.
- Pitt, John I. (2002). "Biology and Ecology of Toxigenic Penicillium Species". Mycotoxins and Food Safety. Advances in Experimental Medicine and Biology. Vol. 504. pp. 29–41. doi:10.1007/978-1-4615-0629-4_4. ISBN 978-1-4613-5166-5. PMID 11922096.
- Frisvad, Jens C.; Thrane, Ulf; Samson, Robert A.; Pitt, John I. (2006). "Important mycotoxins and the fungi which produce them". Advances in Food Mycology. Advances in Experimental Medicine and Biology. Vol. 571. pp. 3–31. doi:10.1007/0-387-28391-9_1. ISBN 978-0-387-28385-2. PMID 16408591.
- Pitt, J. I.; Hocking, Ailsa D. (2006). "Mycotoxins in Australia: Biocontrol of aflatoxin in peanuts". Mycopathologia. 162 (3): 233–243. doi:10.1007/s11046-006-0059-0. PMID 16944290. S2CID 23213408.
- Leong, S.L.; Hocking, A.D.; Pitt, J.I.; Kazi, B.A.; Emmett, R.W.; Scott, E.S. (2006). "Australian research on ochratoxigenic fungi and ochratoxin A". International Journal of Food Microbiology. 111: S10 – S17. doi:10.1016/j.ijfoodmicro.2006.02.005. PMID 16713646.
- Taniwaki, M.H.; Hocking, A.D.; Pitt, J.I.; Fleet, G.H. (2009). "Growth and mycotoxin production by food spoilage fungi under high carbon dioxide and low oxygen atmospheres". International Journal of Food Microbiology. 132 (2–3): 100–108. doi:10.1016/j.ijfoodmicro.2009.04.005. PMID 19428138.
- Copetti, Marina V.; Pereira, José Luís; Iamanaka, Beatriz T.; Pitt, John I.; Taniwaki, Marta H. (2010). "Ochratoxigenic fungi and ochratoxin a in cocoa during farm processing". International Journal of Food Microbiology. 143 (1–2): 67–70. doi:10.1016/j.ijfoodmicro.2010.07.031. PMID 20709419.
- Taniwaki, M.H.; Hocking, A.D.; Pitt, J.I.; Fleet, G.H. (2010). "Growth and mycotoxin production by fungi in atmospheres containing 80% carbon dioxide and 20% oxygen". International Journal of Food Microbiology. 143 (3): 218–225. doi:10.1016/j.ijfoodmicro.2010.08.030. PMID 20864200.
- Calderari, Thaiane O.; Iamanaka, Beatriz T.; Frisvad, Jens C.; Pitt, John I.; Sartori, Daniele; Pereira, Jose Luiz; Fungaro, Maria Helena P.; Taniwaki, Marta H. (2013). "The biodiversity of Aspergillus section Flavi in brazil nuts: From rainforest to consumer". International Journal of Food Microbiology. 160 (3): 267–272. doi:10.1016/j.ijfoodmicro.2012.10.018. PMID 23290234.
- Pitt, J.I.; Taniwaki, Marta H.; Cole, M.B. (2013). "Mycotoxin production in major crops as influenced by growing, harvesting, storage and processing, with emphasis on the achievement of Food Safety Objectives". Food Control. 32: 205–215. doi:10.1016/j.foodcont.2012.11.023.
- Copetti, Marina V.; Iamanaka, Beatriz T.; Pitt, John I.; Taniwaki, Marta H. (2014). "Fungi and mycotoxins in cocoa: From farm to chocolate". International Journal of Food Microbiology. 178: 13–20. doi:10.1016/j.ijfoodmicro.2014.02.023. PMID 24667314.
- Taniwaki, Marta Hiromi; Pitt, John I.; Magan, Naresh (2018). "Aspergillus species and mycotoxins: Occurrence and importance in major food commodities". Current Opinion in Food Science. 23: 38–43. doi:10.1016/j.cofs.2018.05.008. hdl:1826/13269. S2CID 90987180.
- Pitt, John I.; Hocking, Ailsa D. (2022). "Aspergillus and Related Teleomorphs". Fungi and Food Spoilage. pp. 351–439. doi:10.1007/978-3-030-85640-3_8. ISBN 978-3-030-85638-0.

=== Books ===
- Pitt, John I.; Hocking, Ailsa D. (2023). Fungi and Food Spoilage (4th ed.). Springer. ISBN 9783030856403.
  - 1st edition. Academic Press. 1985. ISBN 0125577303. LCCN 85072477.
  - Pitt, John I.; Hocking, A. D. (13 November 2012). 2012 pbk reprint of 1997 2nd edition. Springer. ISBN 978-1461379362.)
  - Pitt, John I.; Hocking, Ailsa D. (25 July 2009). 2009 3rd edition. Springer. ISBN 978-1489984098.
