= Salisediminibacterium halotolerans =

Scientific classification
- Domain: Bacteria
- Kingdom: Bacillati
- Phylum: Bacillota
- Class: Bacilli
- Order: Bacillales
- Family: Bacillaceae
- Genus: Salisediminibacterium
- Species: S. halotolerans

Binomial name
- Salisediminibacterium halotolerans Jiang et al. 2012

Type strain
- CGMCC 1.7654, NBRC 104935, strain halo-2

Species of bacterium

Salisediminibacterium halotolerans is a gram-positive, alkalitolerant, and halophilic bacterium from the family Bacillaceae and genus of Salisediminibacterium, which was one of three bacterial strains, and the only novel species, isolated from sediments from the Xiarinaoer soda lake in Mongolia in 2012.

== History ==
Salisediminibacterium halotolerans (strain halo-2T) was one of three bacterial strains extracted from sediment of the Xiarinaoer soda lake located in the Inner Mongolia Autonomous Region. The other strains include Halolactibacillus alkaliphilus and Salsuginibacillus halophilus, which are two novel strains of halophilic bacterial species that had already been discovered. At the time the sediment samples were collected from the lake, the sediment was −1 °C, had a pH of 9.91, and the salinity of the overlying water was 84 g l^{−1}.

Strain halo-2T appeared to most closely relate to two unidentified isolates from Soda lakes in Kenya through phylogenetic analysis based on 16S rRNA gene sequencing. Low levels of 16S rRNA sequence similarity with established species indicated that the strain halo-2T belonged to a novel taxonomic group, Salisedminibacterium halotolerans.

In 2015, a novel strain belonging to the genus Salisediminibacterium was discovered in the Lonar soda lake in India. This strain is called Salisediminibacterium haloalkalitolerans, and is 99.9% related to Salisediminibacterium halotolerans (strain CGMCC).

== Characteristics ==
The Salisedminibacterium genus is characterized by rod-shaped cells inhabiting salt sediments. These bacteria are Gram-reaction-positive and are facultative anaerobes. Initially thought to be non-spore forming and non-motile, the genus is variably motile and may or may not form spores. The species halotolerans means that the strain halo-2T can withstand high salt concentrations. It can grow in a pH ranging from 5.0 to 10.0, but the optimal pH is 8–9. It can grow within a temperature range of 17 - 50 °C, but the optimal temperature is 37 °C.

== Composition ==
The fatty acids of the genus Salisediminibacterium mostly consist of anteiso-C_{15 : 0}, anteiso-C_{17 : 0} and iso-C_{15 : 0}. The cell-wall peptidoglycan contains the diagnostic diamino acid meso-diaminopimelic acid. The predominant menaquinone is MK-7. The polar lipids include four phospholipids (PL1, 3, 5 and 6) including diphosphatidylglycerol, phosphatidylethanolamine and phosphatidylglycerol and an unknown aminophospholipid (APL1).

Strain halo-2T does not contain the catalase, oxidase, urease, or nitrate reductase enzymes, but does contain enzymes to hydrolyze starch. Its cell wall peptidoglycan contains meso-diaminopimelic acid and MK-7, the predominant menaquinone. The polar lipid profile of strain halo-2T consists of diphosphatidylglycerol, phosphatidylethanolamine and phosphatidylglycerol. The strain produces a water-insoluble orange pigment, with a major peak at 459 nm, and has a genomic DNA G+C content of 48.2 mol%.
