= Osmophile =

Organism tolerant osmotic effects from a low water activity

An osmophile is an extremophile microorganism adapted to environments generating high osmotic pressures, such as aqueous solutions with high salt or sugar concentrations (e.g., brines or syrups). Osmophiles are similar to halophiles (salt-loving organisms) in that a critical aspect of both types of environment is their low water activity, a_{W}. High sugar concentrations represent a growth-limiting factor for many microorganisms, yet osmophiles protect themselves against this high osmotic pressure by the synthesis of osmoprotectants such as alcohols and amino acids. Many osmophilic microorganisms are yeasts; some bacteria are also osmophilic.

Osmophilic yeasts are important because they cause food spoilage in the sugar and sweet goods industry, with products such as fruit juices, fruit juice concentrates, liquid sugars (such as golden syrup), honey, and in some cases marzipan. Among the most osmophilic are:

Organism	Minimum a_{W}
Saccharomyces rouxii	0.62
Saccharomyces bailii	0.80
Debaryomyces	0.83
Wallemia sebi	0.87
Saccharomyces cerevisiae	0.90

== See also ==
- Extremophile – Organisms capable of living in extreme environments
- Xerophile – Organism that can grow and reproduce with low available water
