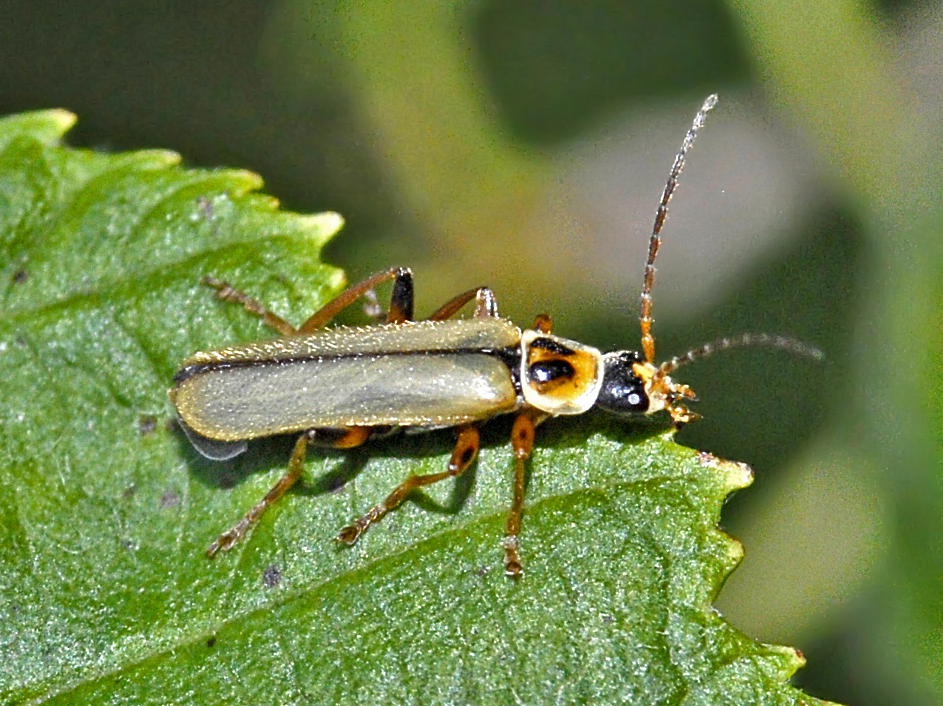

Scientific classification
- Kingdom: Animalia
- Phylum: Arthropoda
- Clade: Pancrustacea
- Class: Insecta
- Order: Coleoptera
- Suborder: Polyphaga
- Infraorder: Elateriformia
- Family: Cantharidae
- Genus: Metacantharis
- Species: M. clypeata

Binomial name
- Metacantharis clypeata (Illiger, 1798)

Synonyms
- Cantharis clypeata Illiger, 1798; Cantharis haemorrhoidalis Fabricius, 1792 nec Gmelin, 1790; Metacantharis haemorrhoidalis (Fabricius)

= Metacantharis clypeata =

Species of beetle

Metacantharis clypeata is a species of soldier beetle belonging to the family Cantharidae.

== Etymology ==
The Latin genus name Metacantharis is composed by meta (meaning middle) and Cantharis (other genus of Soldier beetles), while the Latin species name clypeata means distinguished by the clypeus.

== Description ==
Metacantharis clypeata can reach a length of 6.5–10 millimetres (0.26–0.39 in). Elytrae are pale yellowish or pale brownish, with a dark suture and sparse short semi-erect pubescence. The head is black to the front of the eyes. Pronotum shows a basic yellow color with two black spots often merged and located on the rear half. Scutellum is black. These soldier beetles occur from April to July, mostly on pines and oaks.

== Habitat ==
Metacantharis clypeata lives in lowland and upland areas up to an altitude of about 1900 m above sea level. It is a xerophilous species, may be a relic of the cold and dry climate of the late Pleistocene and early Holocene.

== Distribution ==
This species can be found in Albania, Great Britain, Bulgaria, Czech Republic, France, Germany, Greece, Italy, Hungary, Lithuania, Poland, Russia, Slovakia, Spain, Switzerland, eastern Palaearctic realm, and North Africa.
