= Osmozyma tolerans =

Scientific classification
- Domain: Eukaryota
- Kingdom: Fungi
- Division: Ascomycota
- Class: Pichiomycetes
- Order: Serinales
- Family: Metschnikowiaceae
- Genus: Osmozyma
- Species: O. tolerans

Binomial name
- Osmozyma tolerans Lachance, J.M. Bowles, Starmer & J.S.F. Barker ex Q.M. Wang, Yurkov, Boekhout & F.Y. Bai, 2024

Species of fungus

Osmozyma tolerans is an ascomycetous yeast species first isolated from Australian Hibiscus flowers. It is small and a pseudomycelium is formed. The carbon and nitrogen assimilation pattern is similar to that of Zygosaccharomyces rouxii. Its type strain is UWO (PS) 98-115.5 (CBS 8613).
