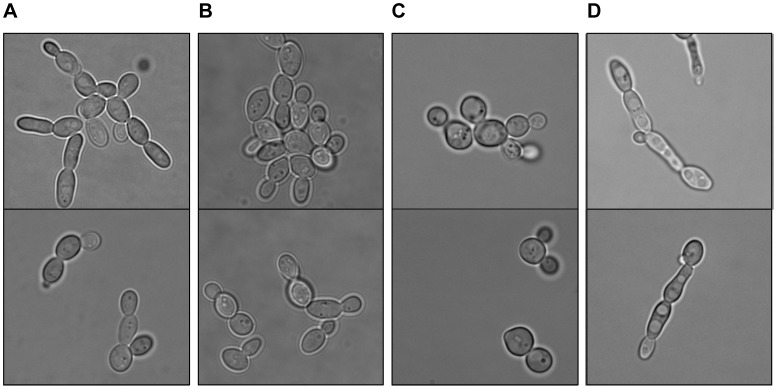
- Zygosaccharomyces rouxii growing on media with different carbon sources

Scientific classification
- Kingdom: Fungi
- Division: Ascomycota
- Class: Saccharomycetes
- Order: Saccharomycetales
- Family: Saccharomycetaceae
- Genus: Zygosaccharomyces
- Species: Z. rouxii

Binomial name
- Zygosaccharomyces rouxii (Boutroux) Yarrow (1977)

= Zygosaccharomyces rouxii =

Species of yeast

Zygosaccharomyces rouxii is a species of yeast in the genus Zygosaccharomyces. Initially described as Saccharomyces rouxii by Boutroux in 1883, it was then moved to the genus Zygosaccharomyces in the work of Barnett et al. It is remarkably tolerant of high concentrations of sugar or salt, making it a spoilage agent in otherwise stable foods, but is also used in fermentation of some products such as soy sauce and balsamic vinegar.

== Description ==
It is a diploid, homothallic, and osmophilic (capable of withstanding high osmotic pressures, such as high concentrations of sugar) yeast. It produces ethanol by alcoholic fermentation.

It is found on grapes, in urine, fermented foods, syrups (maple), honey, grape juice concentrate, marzipan, candied fruit, miso, marmalade, and wine.

It is capable of fermenting dextrose (D-glucose) and maltose but has no fermentation activity on sucrose and lactose. Cells are small, round or oval and linked together in chains. It is particularly tolerant of a wide range of acidity and sugar and salt concentration but is sensitive to temperatures above 35°C unless protected by a small amount of sugar in the medium.

In lab, is grown on malt extract agar. After 3 days at 25°C, cells are spheroidal to cylindrical, either singly or in pairs or sometimes in small clumps.

== History ==
Two collaborators of Louis Pasteur are the origin of the discovery of this new yeast: it was isolated by Émile Roux from fermenting fruit juice and was described as Saccharomyces rouxi by Léon Boutroux in 1883.

It has been described multiple times under different names. See the Catalogue of Life checklist.

It was genetically sequenced in 2009.

== Usage ==
In food, this yeast is used in the fermentation of soybeans during the manufacture of soy sauce and miso where it plays an important role in the development of aromas. It is also present in the fermentation of traditional Italian balsamic vinegar. (Note: Zygosaccharomyces rouxii together with Zygosaccharomyces bailii, Z. pseudorouxii, Z. mellis, Z. bisporus, Z. lentus, Hanseniaspora valbyensis, Hanseniaspora osmophila, Candida lactis-condensi, Candida stellata, Saccharomycodes ludwigii, Saccharomyces cerevisiae)

In the manufacture of soy sauce, soybeans and grain are inoculated with mold cultures such as Aspergillus oryzae to make what is called koji, then it is put in brine and seeded with the lactic acid bacteria Tetragenococcus halophilus (Note: Formerly known as Pediococcus halophilus) which produces lactic acid then with Zygosaccharomyces rouxii which ferments alcohol.

Miso is obtained from a cereal koji seeded with a mold (Aspergillus oryzae) which is then salted and fermented by lactic acid bacteria. (Enterococcus, Pediococcus...) and yeasts like Z. rouxii.

Z. rouxii produces alcoholic fermentation and hydrolyzes various amino acids into their respective alcohols. It synthesises aromatic components HEMF and HDMF. (Note: 4-hydroxy-2(or5)ethyl-5(or2)-methyl-3(2H)-furanone (HEMF) and 4-hydroxy-2,5dimethyl-3(2H)-furanone (HDMF))

Z. rouxii can cause spoilage of certain high-sugar and high-salt foods such as condensed milk, fruit juices, jam, pastries and salad dressings. It causes alcoholic fermentation: the alteration of the product is manifested by an alcoholic taste and especially by an intense gas release which makes drinks fizzy and which can cause the packaging to swell.
