= Halolactibacillus =

Scientific classification
- Domain: Bacteria
- Kingdom: Bacillati
- Phylum: Bacillota
- Class: Bacilli
- Order: Bacillales
- Family: Bacillaceae
- Genus: Halolactibacillus; Ishikawa et al. 2005

Type species
- Halolactibacillus halophilus Ishikawa et al. 2005

Species
- Halolactibacillus alkaliphilus; Halolactibacillus halophilus; H. miurensis

Synonyms
- Halolactobacillus

Genus of bacteria

Halolactibacillus is a Gram-positive, non-spore-forming and motile genus of bacteria from the family Bacillaceae.

== Phylogeny ==
The currently accepted taxonomy is based on the List of Prokaryotic names with Standing in Nomenclature (LPSN) and National Center for Biotechnology Information (NCBI).

16S rRNA based LTP_10_2024

- Halolactibacillus
  - H. alkaliphilus Cao et al. 2008
  - - H. halophilus Ishikawa et al. 2005
    - H. miurensis Ishikawa et al. 2005

120 marker proteins based GTDB 09-RS220

- Halolactibacillus
  - H. alkaliphilus
  - - H. halophilus
    - H. miurensis
