= Salisediminibacterium locisalis =

Scientific classification
- Domain: Bacteria
- Kingdom: Bacillati
- Phylum: Bacillota
- Class: Bacilli
- Order: Bacillales
- Family: Bacillaceae
- Genus: Salisediminibacterium
- Species: S. locisalis

Binomial name
- Salisediminibacterium locisalis (Marquez et al. 2011) Sultanpuram et al. 2015

Type strain
- CG1, CG2, CG4

Synonyms
- Bacillus locisalis

Species of bacterium

Salisediminibacterium locisalis is a Gram-positive moderately halophilic, alkaliphilic, and motile bacterium from the genus of Salisediminibacterium.
