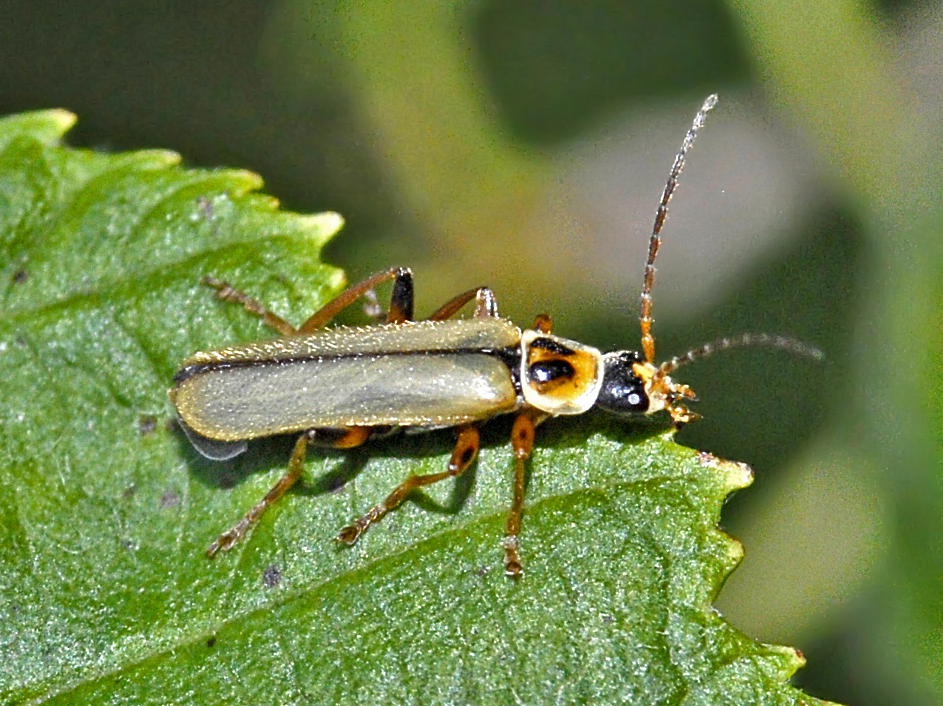
- Metacantharis clypeata

Scientific classification
- Kingdom: Animalia
- Phylum: Arthropoda
- Class: Insecta
- Order: Coleoptera
- Suborder: Polyphaga
- Infraorder: Elateriformia
- Family: Cantharidae
- Genus: Metacantharis; Bourgeois, 1886

= Metacantharis =

Genus of beetles

Metacantharis is a genus of soldier beetles belonging to the family Cantharidae.

== List of species ==
Species within this genus include:

- Metacantharis araxicola (Reitter, 1891)
- Metacantharis balcanograeca Wittmer, 1969
- Metacantharis clypeata (Illiger, 1798)
- Metacantharis discoidea (Ahrens, 1812)
- Metacantharis keiseri Wittmer, 1969
- Metacantharis peloponessica Wittmer, 1974
- Metacantharis picciolii (Ragusa, 1870)
- Metacantharis rosinae (Pic, 1902)
- Metacantharis taurigrada Bourgeois, 1900
- Metacantharis turcica (Marseul, 1864)
- Metacantharis walteri Švihla, 1999
