= Salisediminibacterium haloalkalitolerans =

Scientific classification
- Domain: Bacteria
- Kingdom: Bacillati
- Phylum: Bacillota
- Class: Bacilli
- Order: Bacillales
- Family: Bacillaceae
- Genus: Salisediminibacterium
- Species: S. haloalkalitolerans

Binomial name
- Salisediminibacterium haloalkalitolerans Sultanpuram et al. 2015

Type strain
- CGMCC 1.12818, KCTC 33414, strain 10nlg

Species of bacterium

Salisediminibacterium haloalkalitolerans is a Gram-positive, rod-shaped and non-motile bacterium from the genus of Salisediminibacterium which has been isolated from the Lonar crater lake in India.
