= Ombrophobe =

Plant adverse to rainfall

Ombrophobe or ombrophobous/ombrophobic plant (from Greek ὄμβρος - ombros, "storm of rain" and φόβος - phobos, "fear") is a plant that cannot withstand much rain. A similar term are xerophile and xerophyte.

Ombrophile or ombrophilous/ombrophilic plant is a plant that thrives in abundant amounts of rain.

The terms were introduced by the 19th-century botanist Julius Wiesner, who identified the two extreme kinds of plants, ombrophobes and ombrophiles. Xerophytes are usually ombrophobous.
