= Xerophile =

Organism that can grow and reproduce with low available water

A xerophile (from Ancient Greek ξηρός (xerós), meaning "dry", and φίλος (phílos), meaning "loving") is an extremophilic organism that can grow and reproduce in conditions with a low availability of water, also known as water activity.

Xerophiles are "xerotolerant", meaning tolerant of dry conditions. They can often survive in environments with water activity below 0.8; above which is typical for most life on Earth. Typically xerotolerance is used with respect to matrix drying, where a substance has a low water concentration. These environments include arid desert soils. The term osmophile, or osmotolerant, is typically applied to microorganisms that can grow in solutions with high solute concentrations (salts, sugars), such as halophiles.

== Physics of water activity ==
Water activity, a thermodynamical value denoted a_{w}, is defined as the partial water vapor pressure p in equilibrium with the substance relative to (divided by) the (partial) vapor pressure of pure water p* at the same temperature:
$$a_w \equiv \frac{p}{p^*}$$
The thermodynamical water activity is thus equal to the relative humidity (RH), and the chemical activity of pure water is equal to one: a_{w} = 1.0.

When the atmosphere above a substance, or a solution, is undersaturated in water vapor (p < p^{*}), its water activity is lower than one.

Water activity in solutions is directly related to osmotic pressure, although the exact relationship is complex and still the subject of study.

=== Adaptation to low-water activity areas ===
Eukaryotic and most prokaryotic life will collect or create compatible solutes, also called osmolytes, which establish a counter balance to the osmotic pressures. An example would be some bacteria accumulate KCl to counter-balance NaCl osmotic pressures. Fungi appear to use glycerol as an osmolyte since when cultures are grown in high glycerol concentrations they become better adapted to surviving low water activities.

== Examples of xerophilic species ==
=== Bacteria ===
All taxonomic kingdoms have examples of xerophiles. Microbial xerophiles will usually inhabit environments that are sugar-rich or salt-rich, and xerophilic bacteria will most commonly be found in salt rich areas. Because xerophiles often live in salt-rich environments many halophilic species such as H. halophila, Bacillus halophilus, and H. salina are often also xerophilic.

=== Archaea ===
A xerophilic archaea would be Natronococcus.

=== Eukarya ===
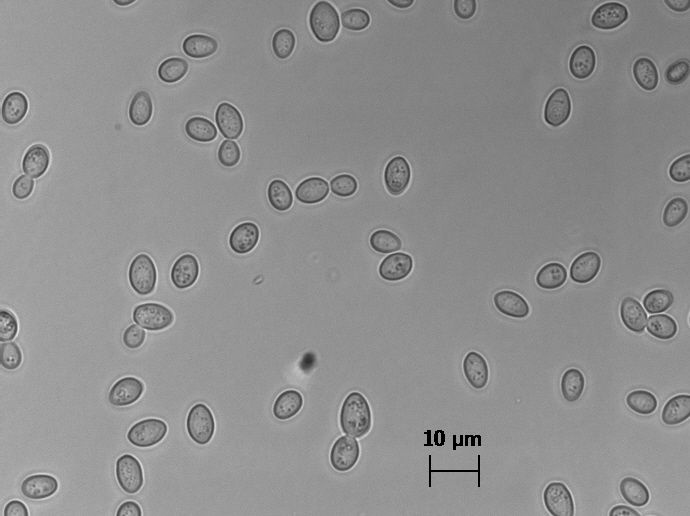
Image of Zygosachromyces, a xerophilic yeast.

Xerophilic fungi will usually be found in environments that are sugar rich, and some xerophilic fungi have shown extremely low water activity, as low as .61. Xerophilic fungi include Trichosporonoides nigrescens, Zygosaccharomyces, and Aspergillus penicillioides.

Among multi plant life an example of a xerophilic plant group is cacti.

== Impact on humans ==
=== Bioremediation ===
Xerophilic micro organisms can be utilized in efforts of bioremediation. This is especially the case when the environment needing bioremediation has low water activity. Xerotolerant bacteria isolated from areas in Chile have expressed traits allowing it to be used as to begin bioremediation.

=== Agriculture ===
For plants to properly grow in dry areas they will need a usable xerotolerant microbiome. In desert plants xerophiles are set in a plant's microbiome helping with its water management.

=== Food storage ===
Xerophiles are a concern to food storage industry due to their ability to bypass common food preservation methods. Many foods are preserved by creating high osmotic pressures that dry out and kill any microbes that attempt to culture in the food. Foods such as honey or jam have such high levels of sugar and low levels of water normal micro organisms can not grow on them. However, xerophilic organisms can grow in these mediums posing a threat to food safety.

The common food preservation methods of reducing water activity (food drying) may not always be sufficient to prevent the growth of xerophilic organisms, often resulting in food spoilage. Some mold and yeast species are xerophilic. Mold growth on bread is an example of food spoilage by xerophilic organisms.

Complete dehydration based on the freeze-drying technique with effective protection inside a tight packaging system, strictly impervious to water and atmospheric gases (O_{2} and CO_{2}), may be required for long-term preservation of food and pharmacochemical substances (antibiotics, vaccines...). Freeze drying can limit the microbial activity on the long term, as long as the product remains perfectly dry in a hermetically sealed and intact package, but it is not a sterilisation technique per se, because after rehydration, even if many dehydrated cells suffer irreversible and lethal damages, some resistant spores and bacterial endospores can still be revived again, and multiplied, by means of microbiological cultures if the product was not initially sterilized by applying a proven technique.

=== Museum conservation ===
Humidity and temperature control to prevent bacterial and fungal growth is a key part of museum conservation. There is increasing evidence that xerophilic moulds are more common in museums than is generally admitted, with destructive effects on their collections, and this may have been exacerbated by the inadvertent creation of a xerophile-friendly environment.

== See also ==
- Extremophile – Organisms capable of living in extreme environments
- Ombrophobe – Plant adverse to rainfall
- Osmophile – Organism tolerant osmotic effects from a low water activity
- Xerocole – Any animal adapted to live in the desert
- Xerophyte – Plant that is adapted to a hot dry environment
