= Salisediminibacterium =

Scientific classification
- Domain: Bacteria
- Kingdom: Bacillati
- Phylum: Bacillota
- Class: Bacilli
- Order: Bacillales
- Family: Bacillaceae
- Genus: Salisediminibacterium; Jiang et al. 2012

Type species
- Salisediminibacterium halotolerans Jiang et al. 2012

Species
- S. beveridgei; S. haloalkalitolerans; S. halotolerans; S. locisalis; S. selenitireducens

Genus of bacteria

Salisediminibacterium is a genus of Gram-positive bacteria from the family Bacillaceae. The type species is Salisediminibacterium halotolerans.

Salisediminibacterium beveridgei and Salisediminibacterium selenitireducens were previously species belonging to Bacillus, a genus that has been recognized as displaying extensive polyphyly and has been restricted by recent phylogenetic studies to only include species closely related to Bacillus subtilis and Bacillus cereus.

The name Salisediminibacterium is derived from the prefix "-salisedimini" (from the Latin noun sal, which translates to "salt" and the Latin noun sedimen, referring to sediment), and the suffix "-bacterium" (from the Latin noun bacterium, referring to a rod). Together, Salisediminibacterium translates to a rod from salt sediment.

== Biochemical Characteristics and Molecular Signatures ==
Cells are either non-spore formers or spore forming and are variably motile. Catalase and nitrate reduction activities are variable. Most species are halophilic and alkali-tolerant requiring a minimum of 1% (w/v) NaCl in the medium for growth to occur. S. selenitireducens demonstrates weak microaerophilic growth and anaerobic respiratory growth with Se(IV), As(V), nitrate, nitrite, trimethylamine oxide and fumarate as electron acceptors.

Analyses of genome sequences from Salisediminibacterium species identified four conserved signature indels (CSIs) for this genus in the following proteins: insulinase family protein, alpha-ketoacid dehydrogenase subunit beta, MBL fold metallo-hydrolase and excinuclease ABC subunit UvrA, which in most cases are exclusively shared by either all or most members of this genus. These CSIs provide a reliable method of identification and differentiation for this genus from other Bacillaceae genera and bacteria.

== Taxonomy ==
Salisediminibacterium, as of May 2021, contains a total of 5 species with validly published names. This branching pattern is also observed in the Genome Taxonomy Database (GTDB).

=== Phylogeny ===
16S rRNA based LTP_10_2024

- Salisediminibacterium~
  - Salisediminibacterium beveridgei (Baesman et al. 2010) Gupta et al. 2020
  - Salisediminibacterium selenitireducens (Switzer Blum et al. 2001) Gupta et al. 2020

- Salisediminibacterium
  - S. locisalis (Marquez et al. 2011) Sultanpuram et al. 2015
  - - S. haloalkalitolerans Sultanpuram et al. 2015
    - S. halotolerans Jiang et al. 2012

120 marker proteins based GTDB 09-RS220

- Salisediminibacterium
  - S. halotolerans [incl. S. haloalkalitolerans]
  - - S. beveridgei
    - S. selenitireducens
