= Salsuginibacillus kocurii =

Scientific classification
- Domain: Bacteria
- Kingdom: Bacillati
- Phylum: Bacillota
- Class: Bacilli
- Order: Bacillales
- Family: Bacillaceae
- Genus: Salsuginibacillus
- Species: S. kocurii

Binomial name
- Salsuginibacillus kocurii Carrasco et al. 2007

Type strain
- CCM 7365, CECT 7154, CGMCC 1.6287, CH9d, DSM 18087

Species of bacterium

Salsuginibacillus kocurii is a Gram-positive, moderately halophilic, alkalitolerant, endospore-forming, rod-shaped and motile bacterium from the genus of Salsuginibacillus. It was isolated from sediments in Lake Chagannor, Mongolia.
