= Salsuginibacillus =

Scientific classification
- Domain: Bacteria
- Kingdom: Bacillati
- Phylum: Bacillota
- Class: Bacilli
- Order: Bacillales
- Family: Bacillaceae
- Genus: Salsuginibacillus; Carrasco et al. 2007

Type species
- Salsuginibacillus kocurii Carrasco et al. 2007

Species
- S. halophilus; S. kocurii

Genus of bacteria

Salsuginibacillus is a genus of bacteria from the family of Bacillaceae.

== Phylogeny ==
The currently accepted taxonomy is based on the List of Prokaryotic names with Standing in Nomenclature (LPSN) and National Center for Biotechnology Information (NCBI).

16S rRNA based LTP_10_2024

- Salsuginibacillus
  - S. halophilus Cao et al. 2010
  - S. kocurii Carrasco et al. 2007

120 marker proteins based GTDB 09-RS220

- Salsuginibacillus
  - S. halophilus
  - S. kocurii

== See also ==
- List of Bacteria genera
- List of bacterial orders
