= Aspergillus pisci =

Scientific classification
- Kingdom: Fungi
- Division: Ascomycota
- Class: Eurotiomycetes
- Order: Eurotiales
- Family: Aspergillaceae
- Genus: Aspergillus
- Species: A. pisci

Binomial name
- Aspergillus pisci (A.D. Hocking & Pitt) Houbraken, Visagie & Samson (2014)

Synonyms
- Polypaecilum pisce, Polypaecilum pisci Aspergillus pisce

Species of fungus

Aspergillus pisci is a species of fungus in the genus Aspergillus.
