= Halolactibacillus halophilus =

Scientific classification
- Domain: Bacteria
- Kingdom: Bacillati
- Phylum: Bacillota
- Class: Bacilli
- Order: Bacillales
- Family: Bacillaceae
- Genus: Halolactibacillus
- Species: H. halophilus

Binomial name
- Halolactibacillus halophilus Ishikawa et al. 2005

Type strain
- BCRC 17544, CCRC 17544, DSM 17073, IAM 15242, JCM 21694, M2-2, NBRC 100868, NRIC 0628

Synonyms
- Halolactobacillus halophilus

Species of bacterium

Halolactibacillus halophilus is a non-spore-forming, halophilic and alkaliphilic bacterium from the genus of Halolactibacillus which has been isolated from algae from the Kanagawa Prefecture in Japan.
