= Halolactibacillus alkaliphilus =

Scientific classification
- Domain: Bacteria
- Kingdom: Bacillati
- Phylum: Bacillota
- Class: Bacilli
- Order: Bacillales
- Family: Bacillaceae
- Genus: Halolactibacillus
- Species: H. alkaliphilus

Binomial name
- Halolactibacillus alkaliphilus Cao et al. 2008

Type strain
- CGMCC AS 1.6843, H-5, NBRC 103919

Synonyms
- Halolactibacillus xiariensis

Species of bacterium

Halolactibacillus alkaliphilus is a Gram-positive, facultative anaerobic, moderately alkaliphilic, halophilic and non-motile bacterium from the genus of Halolactibacillus which has been isolated from sediments from the Xiarinaoer soda lake from the Mongolia.
