= Salsuginibacillus halophilus =

Scientific classification
- Domain: Bacteria
- Kingdom: Bacillati
- Phylum: Bacillota
- Class: Bacilli
- Order: Bacillales
- Family: Bacillaceae
- Genus: Salsuginibacillus
- Species: S. halophilus

Binomial name
- Salsuginibacillus halophilus Cao et al. 2010

Type strain
- CGMCC 1.7653, NBRC 104934, halo-1

Species of bacterium

Salsuginibacillus halophilus is a Gram-positive, halophilic, alkalitolerant, endospore-forming and rod-shaped bacterium from the genus of Salsuginibacillus which has been isolated from sediments from the Xiarinaoer soda lake in Mongolia.
