= Aspergillus vitricola =

Scientific classification
- Kingdom: Fungi
- Division: Ascomycota
- Class: Eurotiomycetes
- Order: Eurotiales
- Family: Aspergillaceae
- Genus: Aspergillus
- Species: A. vitricola

Binomial name
- Aspergillus vitricola Ohtsuki (1962)

Species of fungus

Aspergillus vitricola is a species of fungus in the genus Aspergillus. It is from the Robusti section. The species was first described in 1962 by Ohtsuki. It has been isolated from binocular lenses in Japan and house dust in Canada.

== Summary ==
Cryoprotected cells containing viable organisms (including spores and mycelia).

Product category	Fungi
Classification	Eurotiomycetidae, Eurotiales, Aspergillaceae
Strain designation	IFO 6529 [IAM G5, NRRL A-11464]
Type strain	No
Isolation source	Binocular lens
Format	Freeze-dried
Storage conditions	2°C to 8°C
