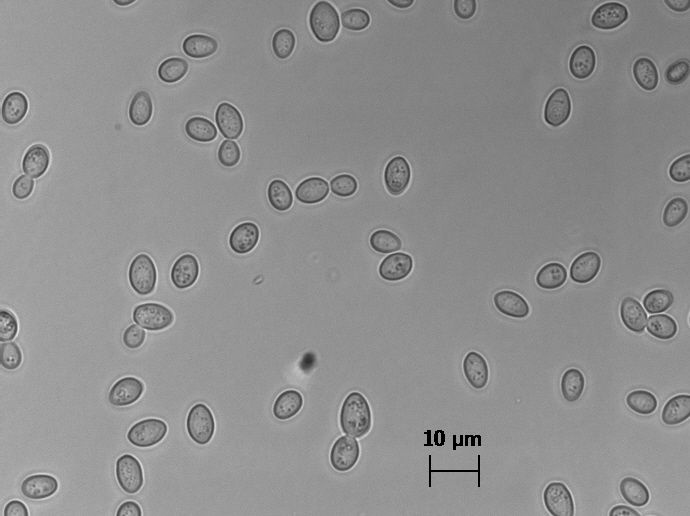
- Zygosaccharomyces bailii cells in Sabouraud medium (100x)

Scientific classification
- Kingdom: Fungi
- Division: Ascomycota
- Class: Saccharomycetes
- Order: Saccharomycetales
- Family: Saccharomycetaceae
- Genus: Zygosaccharomyces
- Species: Z. bailii

Binomial name
- Zygosaccharomyces bailii Barnett et al., 1983

Synonyms
- Saccharomyces bailii (Lindner, 1895); Torulaspora bailii (Lindner) Kock.-Krat. Saccharomyces acidifaciens (Thomas and Davenport, 1985); Saccharomyces elegans (Thomas and Davenport, 1985)

= Zygosaccharomyces bailii =

Species of fungus

Zygosaccharomyces bailii is a species in the genus Zygosaccharomyces. It was initially described as Saccharomyces bailii by Lindner in 1895, but in 1983 it was reclassified as Zygosaccharomyces bailii in the work by Barnett et al.

Spoilage resulting from growth of the yeast Zygosaccharomyces is widespread, which has caused significant economic losses to the food industry. Within this genus, Z. bailii is one of the most troublesome species due to its exceptional tolerance to various stressful conditions. A wide range of acidic and/or high-sugar products such as fruit concentrates, wine, soft drinks, syrups, ketchup, mayonnaise, pickles, salad dressing, etc., are normally considered to be shelf-stable, i.e. they readily inactivate a broad range of food-borne microorganisms. However, these products are still susceptible to spoilage by Z. bailii.

== Morphology and modes of reproduction ==
Zygosaccharomyces bailii vegetative cells are usually ellipsoid, non-motile and reproduced asexually by multilateral budding, i.e. the buds can arise from various sites on the cells. During the budding process, a parent cell produces a bud on its outer surface. As the bud elongates, the parent cell's nucleus divides and one nucleus migrates into the bud. Cell wall material is filled in the gap between the bud and the parent cell; eventually the bud is separated to form a daughter cell of unequal size. Z. bailii cell size varies within a range of (3.5 - 6.5) x (4.5 - 11.5) μm and the cells exist singly or in pair, rarely in short chain. It has been observed that the doubling time of this yeast is approximately 3 hours at 23 °C in yeast nitrogen base broth containing 20% (w/v) fructose (pH 4.0). In more stressful conditions, this generation time is significantly extended.

Besides the asexual reproduction mode, under certain conditions (e.g. nutritional stress) Z. bailii produces sexual spores (ascospores) in a sac called ascus (plural: asci). Normally, each ascus contains one to four ascospores, which are generally smooth, thin-walled, spherical or ellipsoidal. It should be mentioned that the ascospores are rarely observed as it is difficult and may take a long time to induce their formation; besides many yeast strains lose the ability to produce ascospores on repeated sub-cultures in the laboratory. On various nutrient agars, Z. bailii colonies are smooth, round, convex and white to cream coloured, with a diameter of 2 – 3 mm at 3 – 7 days. As the morphology properties of Zygosaccharomyces are identical to other yeast genera such as Saccharomyces, Candida and Pichia, it is impossible to differentiate Zygosaccharomyces from other yeasts or individual species within the genus based on macroscopic and microscopic morphology observations. Therefore, the yeast identification to species level is more dependent on physiological and genetic characteristics than on morphological criteria.

== Culture conditions ==
In general, any glucose-containing medium is suitable for the culture and counting of yeasts, e.g. Sabouraud medium, malt extract agar (MEA), tryptone glucose yeast extract agar (TGY), yeast glucose chloramphenicol agar (YGC). For the detection of acid-resistant yeasts like Z. bailii, acidified media are recommended, such as MEA or TGY with 0.5% (v/v) acetic acid added. Plating with agar media is often used for counting of yeasts, with surface spreading technique is preferable to pour plate method because the former technique gives a better recovery of cells with lower dilution errors. The common incubation conditions are aerobic atmosphere, temperature 25 °C for a period of 5 days. Nevertheless, a higher incubation temperature (30 °C) and shorter incubation time (3 days) can be applied for Z. bailii, as the yeast grows faster at this elevated temperature.

== Physiological properties ==
Among the Zygosaccharomyces spoilage species, Z. bailii possesses the most pronounced and diversified resistance characteristics, enabling it to survive and proliferate in very stressful conditions. It appears that Z. bailii prefers ecological environments characterized by high osmotic conditions. The most frequently described natural habitats are dried or fermented fruits, tree exudates (in vineyards and orchards), and at various stages of sugar refining and syrup production. Besides, it is seldom to encounter Z. bailii as a major spoilage agent in unprocessed foods; usually the yeast only attains importance in processed products when the competition with bacteria and moulds is reduced by intrinsic factors such as pH, water activity (a_{w}), preservatives, etc.

=== Resistance characteristics ===
An outstanding feature of Z. bailii is its exceptional resistance to weak acid preservatives commonly used in foods and beverages, such as acetic, lactic, propionic, benzoic, sorbic acids and sulfur dioxide. In addition, it is reported that the yeast is able to tolerate high ethanol concentrations (≥ 15% (v/v)). The ranges of pH and a_{w} for growth are wide, 2.0 - 7.0 and 0.80 - 0.99, respectively. Besides being preservative resistant, other features that contribute to the spoilage capacity of Z. bailii are: (i) its ability to vigorously ferment hexose sugars (e.g. glucose and fructose), (ii) ability to cause spoilage from an extremely low inoculum (e.g. one viable cell per package of any size), (iii) moderate osmotolerance (in comparison to Zygosaccharomyces rouxii). Therefore, foods at particular risk to spoilage by this yeast usually have low pH (2.5 to 5.0), low a_{w} and contain sufficient amounts of fermentable sugars.

The extreme acid resistance of Z. bailii has been reported by many authors. On several occasions, growth of the yeast has been observed in fruit-based alcohols (pH 2.8 - 3.0, 40 - 45% (w/v) sucrose) preserved with 0.08% (w/v) benzoic acid, and in beverages (pH 3.2) containing either 0.06% (w/v) sorbic acid, 0.07% (w/v) benzoic acid, or 2% (w/v) acetic acid. Notably, individual cells in any Z. bailii population differ considerably in their resistance to sorbic acid, with a small fraction able to grow in preservative levels double that of the average population. In some types of food, the yeast is even able to grow in the presence of benzoic and sorbic acids at concentrations higher than those legally permitted and at pH values below the pK_{a} of the acids. For example, according to the European Union (EU) legislation, sorbic acid is limited to 0.03% (w/v) in soft drinks (pH 2.5 - 3.2); however Z. bailii can grow in soft drinks containing 0.05% (w/v) of this acid (pK_{a} 4.8). Particularly, there is strong evidence that the resistance of Z. bailii is stimulated by the presence of multiple preservatives. Hence, the yeast can survive and defeat synergistic preservative combinations that normally provide microbiological stability to processed foods. It has been observed that the cellular acetic acid uptake was inhibited when sorbic or benzoic acid was incorporated into the culture medium. Similarly, ethanol levels up to 10% (v/v) did not adversely influence sorbic and benzoic acid resistance of the yeast at pH 4.0 - 5.0. Moreover, Sousa et al. (1996) have proved that in Z. bailii, ethanol plays a protective role against the negative effect of acetic acid by inhibiting the transport and accumulation of this acid intracellularly.

Like other microorganisms, Z. bailii has the ability to adapt to sub-inhibitory levels of a preservative, which enables the yeast to survive and grow in much higher concentrations of the preservative than before adaptation. In addition, it seems that Z. bailii resistance to acetic, benzoic and propionic acid is strongly correlated, as the cells which were adapted to benzoic acid also showed enhanced tolerances to the other preservatives.

Some studies have revealed the negligible effects of different sugars on preservative resistance of Z. bailii, e.g. comparable sorbic and benzoic acid resistance was observed regardless whether the cells were grown in culture medium containing glucose or fructose as fermentable substrates. However, the preservative resistance of the yeast is influenced by glucose level, with maximum resistance obtained at 10 - 20% (w/v) sugar concentrations. As Z. bailii is moderately osmotolerant, the salt and sugar levels in foods are usually insufficient to control its growth. The highest tolerance to salt has been observed at low pH values, e.g. the maximum NaCl allowing growth was 12.5% (w/v) at pH 3.0 whereas this was only 5.0% (w/v) at pH 5.0. Moreover, the presence of either salt or sugar has a positive effect on the ability of Z. bailii to initiate growth at extreme pH levels, e.g. the yeast showed no growth at pH 2.0 in the absence of NaCl and sucrose, but grew at this pH in 2.5% (w/v) NaCl or 50% (w/v) sucrose.

Most facultatively fermentative yeast species cannot grow in the complete absence of oxygen. That means limitation of oxygen availability might be useful in controlling food spoilage caused by fermentative yeasts. However, it has been observed that Z. bailii is able to grow rapidly and ferment sugar vigorously in a complex medium under strictly anaerobic condition, indicating that the nutritional requirement for anaerobic growth was met by the complex-medium components. Therefore, restriction of oxygen entry into foods and beverages, which are rich in nutrients, is not a promising strategy to prevent the risk of spoilage by this yeast. Besides, Leyva et al. (1999) have reported that Z. bailii cells can retain their spoilage capability by producing a significant amount of gas even in non-growing conditions (i.e. presence of sugars but absence of nitrogen source).

=== Preservative resistance mechanisms ===
Different strategies have been suggested in accounting for Z. bailii resistance to weak acid preservatives, which include: (i) degradation of the acids, (ii) prevention of entry or removal of acids from the cells, (iii) alteration of the inhibitor target, or amelioration of the caused damage. Particularly, the intrinsic resistance mechanisms of Z. bailii are extremely adaptable and robust. Their functionality and effectiveness are unaffected or marginally suppressed by environmental conditions such as low pH, low a_{w} and limited nutrients.

For a long time, it has been known that Z. bailii can maintain an acid gradient across the cell membrane, which indicates the induction of a system whereby the cells can reduce the intracellular acid accumulation. According to Warth (1977), Z. bailii uses an inducible, active transport pump to expel acid anions from the cells for counteracting the toxic effects of the acids. As the pump requires energy to function optimally, high sugar levels enhance Z. bailii preservative resistance. Nevertheless, this view was disputed from an observation that the concentration of acid was exactly as predicted from the intracellular, extracellular pH's and pK_{a} of the acid. Besides, it is unlikely that an active acid extrusion alone would be sufficient to achieve an unequal acid distribution across the cell membrane. Instead, Z. bailii might have developed much more efficient ways of altering its cell membrane to limit the diffusional entry of acids into the cells. This, in turn, will dramatically reduce any need for active extrusion of protons and acid anions, thus saving a lot of energy. Indeed, Warth (1989) has reported that the uptake rate of propionic acid by diffusion in Z. bailii is much lower than in other acid-sensitive yeasts (e.g. Saccharomyces cerevisiae). Hence, it is conceivable that Z. bailii puts more effort on limiting the influx of acids in order to enhance its acid resistance.

Another mechanism of Z. bailii to deal with acid challenge is that the yeast uses a plasma membrane H^{+}-adenosine triphosphatase (H^{+}-ATPase) to expel proton from cells, thereby preventing intracellular acidification. In addition, Cole and Keenan (1987) have suggested that Z. bailii resistance includes an ability to tolerate chronic intracellular pH drops. Besides, the fact that the yeast is able to metabolize preservatives may also contribute to its acid tolerance. Regarding the resistance of Z. bailii to SO_{2}, it has been proposed that the cells reduce the concentration of SO_{2} by producing extracellular sulphite-binding compounds such as acetaldehyde.

=== Metabolism ===
The fructophilic behaviour is well known in Z. bailii. Unlike most of other yeasts, Z. bailii metabolizes fructose more rapidly than glucose and grows much faster in foods containing ≥ 1% (w/w) of fructose. In addition, it has been observed that the alcoholic fermentation under aerobic conditions (the Crabtree effect) in Z. bailii is influenced by the carbon source, i.e. ethanol is produced at a higher rate and with a higher yield on fructose than on glucose. This is because in Z. bailii, fructose is transported by a specific high-capacity system, while glucose is transported by a lower-capacity system, which is partially inactivated by fructose and also accepts fructose as a substrate.

The slow fermentation of sucrose is directly related to fructose metabolism. According to Pitt and Hocking (1997), Z. bailii cannot grow in foods with sucrose as the sole carbon source. As it requires time to hydrolyze sucrose into glucose and fructose (in low pH conditions), there is a long delay between manufacture and spoilage of products contaminated with this yeast when sucrose is used as the primary carbohydrate ingredient. This is usually preceded by a lag of 2 – 4 weeks and apparent deterioration of product quality is only shown 2 – 3 months after manufacturing Therefore, the use of sucrose as a sweetener (instead of glucose or fructose) is highly recommended in synthetic products such as soft drinks.

Fermentation of sugars (e.g. glucose, fructose and sucrose) is a key metabolic reaction of most yeasts (including Z. bailii) when cultured under facultative anaerobic conditions. As sugars are common components of foods and beverages, fermentation is a typical feature of the spoilage process. Principally, these sugars are converted to ethanol and CO_{2}, causing the products to lose sweetness and acquire a distinctive alcoholic aroma along with gassiness. Besides, many secondary products are formed in small amounts, such as organic acids, esters, aldehydes, etc. Z. bailii is noted for its strong production of secondary metabolites, e.g. acetic acid, ethyl acetate and acetaldehyde. In high enough concentrations, these substances can have a dominant effect on the sensorial quality of the products. The higher resistance of Z. bailii to weak acids than S. cerevisiae can partly be explained by its ability to metabolize preservatives. It has been demonstrated that Z. bailii is able to consume acetic acid in the presence of fermentable sugars, whereas the acetate uptake and utilization systems of S. cerevisiae are all glucose-repressed. In addition, Z. bailii can also oxidatively degrade sorbate and benzoate (and use these compounds as a sole carbon source), while S. cerevisiae does not have this capability.

== Spoilage activities ==
According to Thomas and Davenport (1985), early reports of spoilage in mayonnaise and salad dressing due to Z. bailii date back to the beginning of the 20th century. More detailed investigations in the 1940s and 1950s confirmed that Z. bailii was the main spoiler in cucumber pickles, sundry pickled vegetable mixes, acidified sauces, etc. Around the same time, fermentation spoilage incidents occasionally appeared in fruit syrups and beverages preserved with moderate benzoic acid levels (0.04 - 0.05% (w/w)). Again, Z. bailii was identified as the spoilage source. Nowadays, despite great improvements in formulation control, food processing equipment and sanitation technologies (e.g. automated clean-in-place), the yeast remains highly problematic in sauces, acidified foods, pickled or brined vegetables, fruit concentrates and various non-carbonated fruit drinks. Z. bailii is also well recognized as one of the main spoilers in wines due to its high resistance to combinations of ethanol and organic acids at low pH. Furthermore, the spoilage by this yeast has been expanding into new food categories such as prepared mustards, fruit-flavoured carbonated soft drinks containing citrus, apple and grape juice concentrates. The ability of Z. bailii in spoiling a wide range of foods is a reflection of its high resistance to many stress factors. Therefore, it has been included in the list of most dangerous spoilage yeasts by several authors.

Spoilage by Z. bailii often occurs in acidic shelf-stable foods, which rely upon the combined effects of acidity (e.g. vinegar), salt and sugar to suppress microbial growth. The spoiled foods usually display sensorial changes that can be easily recognized by consumers, thus resulting in significant economic losses due to consumers' complaints or product recalls Observable signs of spoilage include product leakage from containers, colour change, emission of unpleasant yeasty odours, emulsion separation (in mayonnaises, dressings), turbidity, flocculation or sediment formation (in wines, beverages) and visible colonies or brown film development on product surfaces. The specific off-flavour that has been attributed to Z. bailii is related to H_{2}S. In addition, the taste of spoiled foods can be modified by the production of acetic acid and fruity esters. It has been reported that growth of Z. bailii also results in significant gas and ethanol formation, causing a typical alcoholic taste. The excessive gas production is a direct consequence of high fermentable ability of this yeast and in more solid food, gas bubbles can appear within the product. Under extreme circumstances, the produced gas pressure inside glass jars or bottles can reach such a level that explosions may take place, creating an additional hazard of injuries from broken glass. It should be mentioned that in general, detectable spoilage by yeasts requires the presence of a high number of cells, approximately 5 - 6 log CFU/ml.

Apart from spoiling foods, as a direct consequent of growth, Z. bailii can modify the product texture and composition such that it may be more readily colonized by other spoilage microorganisms. For example, by utilizing acetic acid, the yeast can raise the pH of pickles sufficiently to allow the growth of less acid-tolerant bacteria. Besides, as with other yeasts, the concentration of fermentable sugar in a product affects the rate of spoilage by Z. bailii, e.g. the yeast grows faster in the presence of 10% (w/w) than 1% (w/w) glucose. Particularly, Z. bailii can grow and cause spoilage from extremely low inocula, as few as one viable cell in ≥ 10 liters of beverages. That means detection of low numbers of yeast cells in a product does not guarantee its stability. No sanitation or microbiological quality control program can cope with this degree of risk. Hence, the only alternatives would be reformulation of food to increase the stability and/or application of high-lethality thermal-processing parameters.

Apart from unwanted spoilage, this yeast is also present in the fermentation of traditional Italian balsamic vinegar (Zygosaccharomyces rouxii together with Zygosaccharomyces bailii, Z. pseudorouxii, Z. mellis, Z. bisporus, Z. lentus, Hanseniaspora valbyensis, Hanseniaspora osmophila, Candida lactis-condensi, Candida stellata, Saccharomycodes ludwigii, Saccharomyces cerevisiae)

== See also ==
- Yeast in winemaking
- Zygosaccharomyces
