= Malt extract agar =

Medium used for the cultivation of fungi

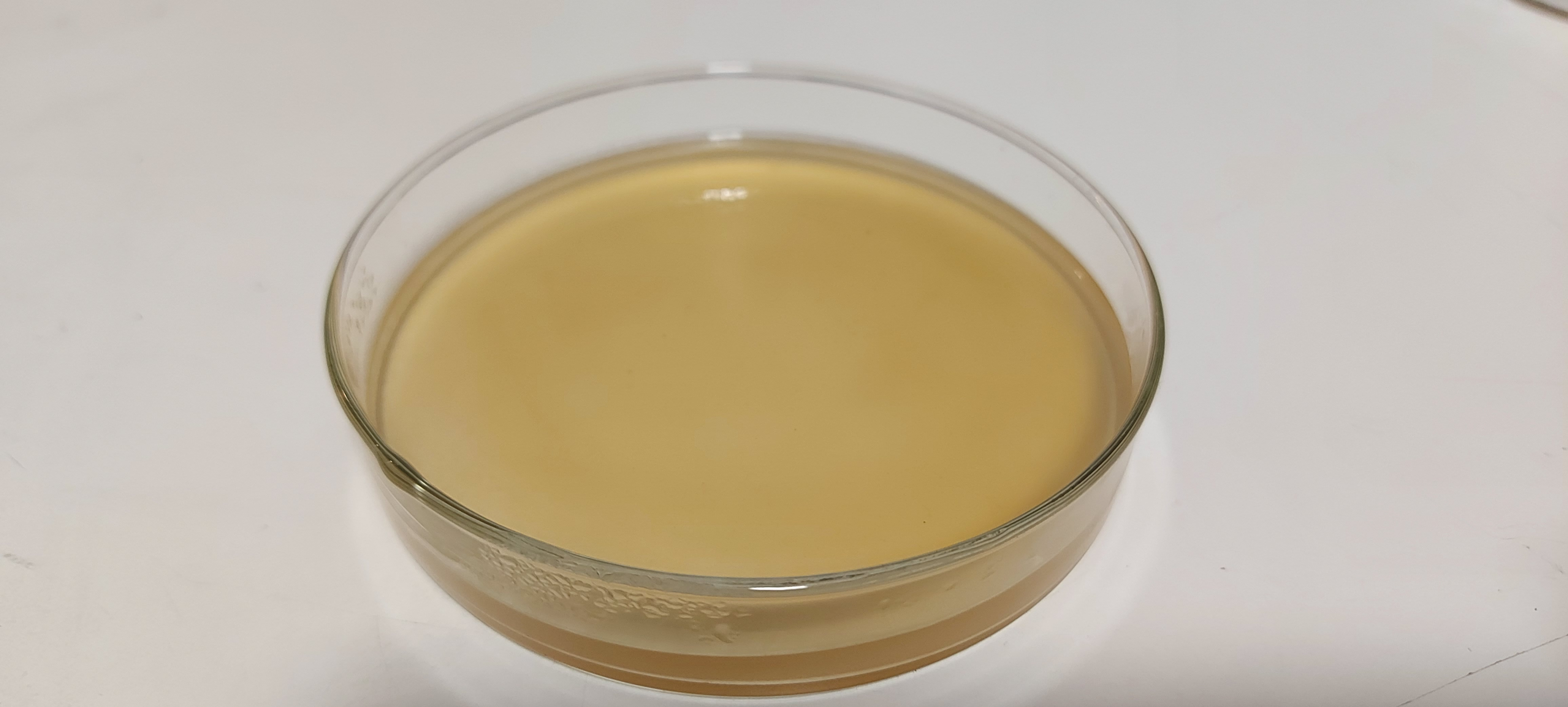
- Petri dish with malt extract agar
- Uses: Microbiological culture Fungiculture
- Related items: Petri dish Growth medium Agar plate

Malt extract agar or MEA, also called light malt extract media, LME, is a culture medium commonly used for the cultivation of fungi. It mainly contains the extract of malted barley. Other ingredients such as peptone, dextrose or yeast extract may also be included. Malt extract agar is popular for the detection, isolation and enumeration of yeasts and moulds as well as the culture of edible mushrooms.

== Typical composition ==
A basic recipe is shown in the following chart.

value	ingredients & conditions
1000 mL	water
30 g	light malt extract
20 g	agar powder

some recipes also include around 5 g of peptone and/or 20 g of dextrose per litre.

The ingredients are generally heated until boiling to dissolve the agar and autoclaved before being left to cool to a safe temperature and then added to petri dishes or other culture vessels.

In some cases the agar is omitted resulting in a liquid media referred to as malt extract broth. This may be used for the liquid culture of fungal mycelium among other things.
