= Food spoilage =

Bacteria and fungi rendering food unsafe

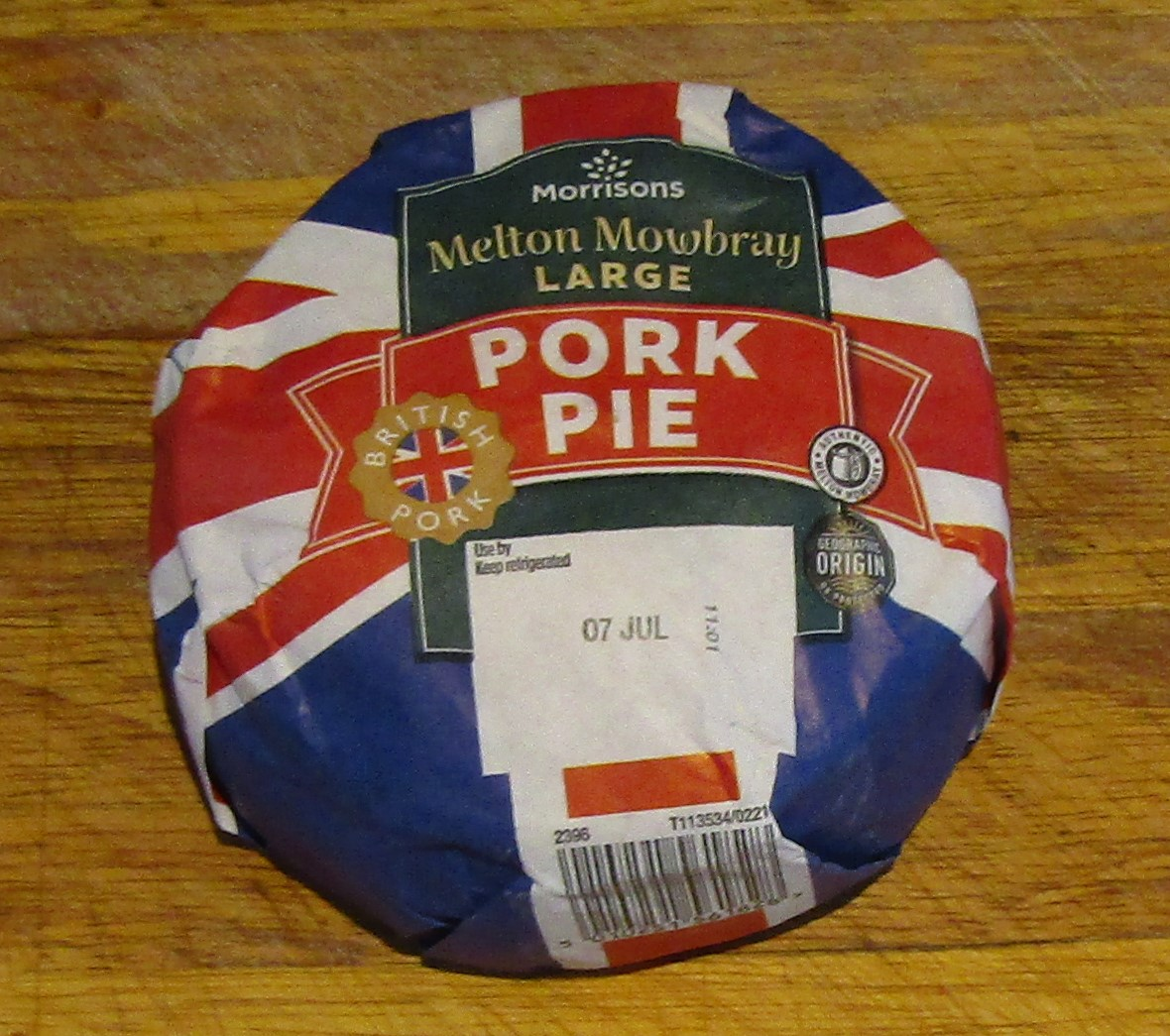
Use by date on a packaged food item, showing that the consumer should consume the product before this time in order to reduce chance of consuming spoiled food

Food spoilage is the process whereby food becomes unsuitable for human consumption due to issues of food safety. Spoilage is caused by bacteria and various fungi.

An estimated third of the food produced every year for human consumption globally, is lost due to spoilage.

Various factors such as type of product, packaging and storage, and whether any to preservative measures are taken, e.g., freezing, canning, processing contribute to the product's shelf life.

== Bacteria ==
Some bacteria are responsible for causing food to spoil. When bacteria breaks down food, it generates acids and other waste products. While the bacteria itself may or may not be harmful, the waste products may make the food unpalatable or even unsafe. There are many species of pathogenic bacteria; some target specific categories of food. For example, Clostridium botulinum spoils food such as meat and poultry.

When food is stored or subjected to conditions suitable for bacterial growth, the organisms will begin to breed, producing harmful toxins that can cause severe illness, even when cooked safely.

== Fungi ==
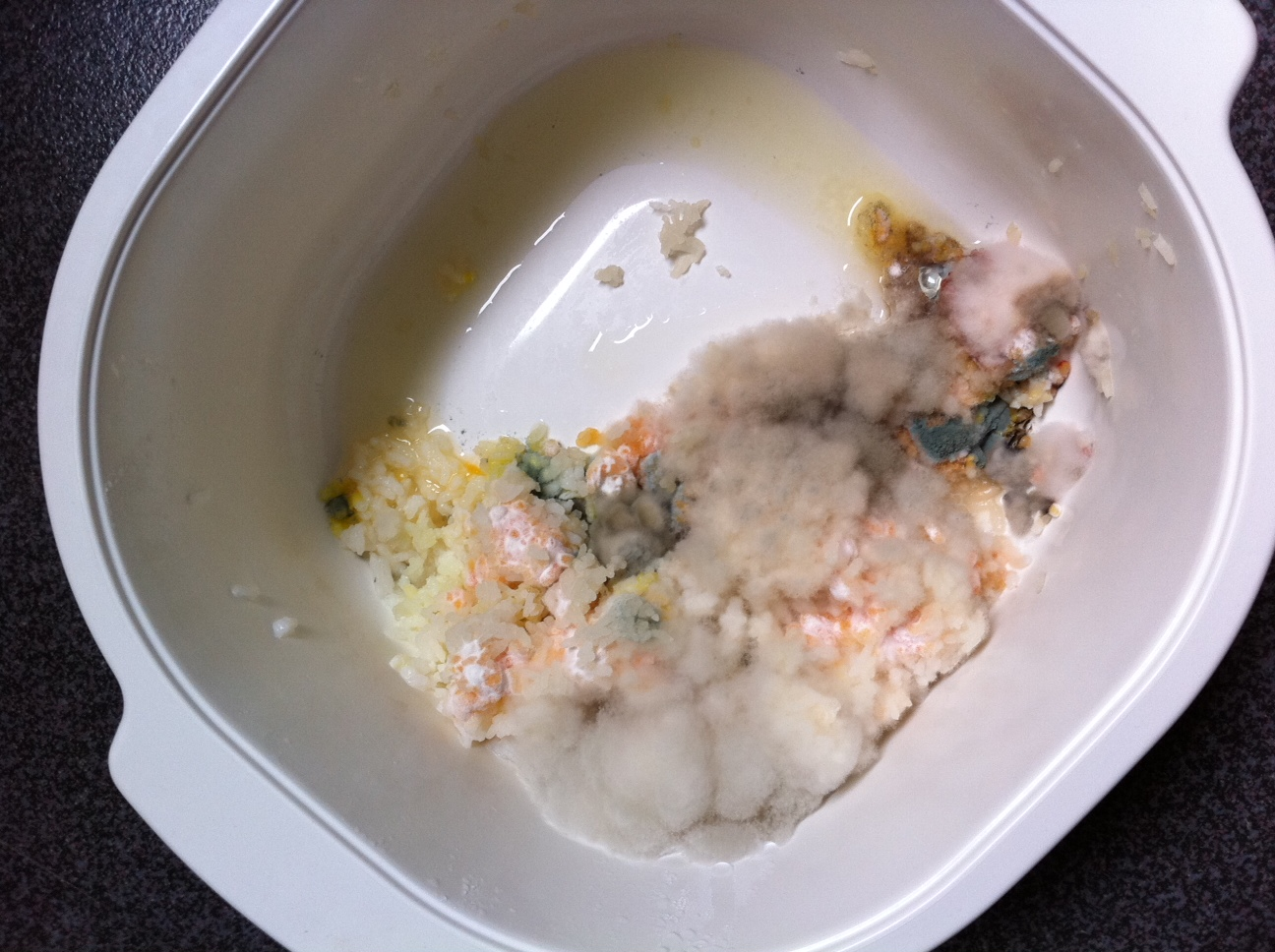
A bowl of white rice with mold growing over it

Fungi, primarily molds, are a cause of food spoilage and create the characteristic visual signs of spoilage.

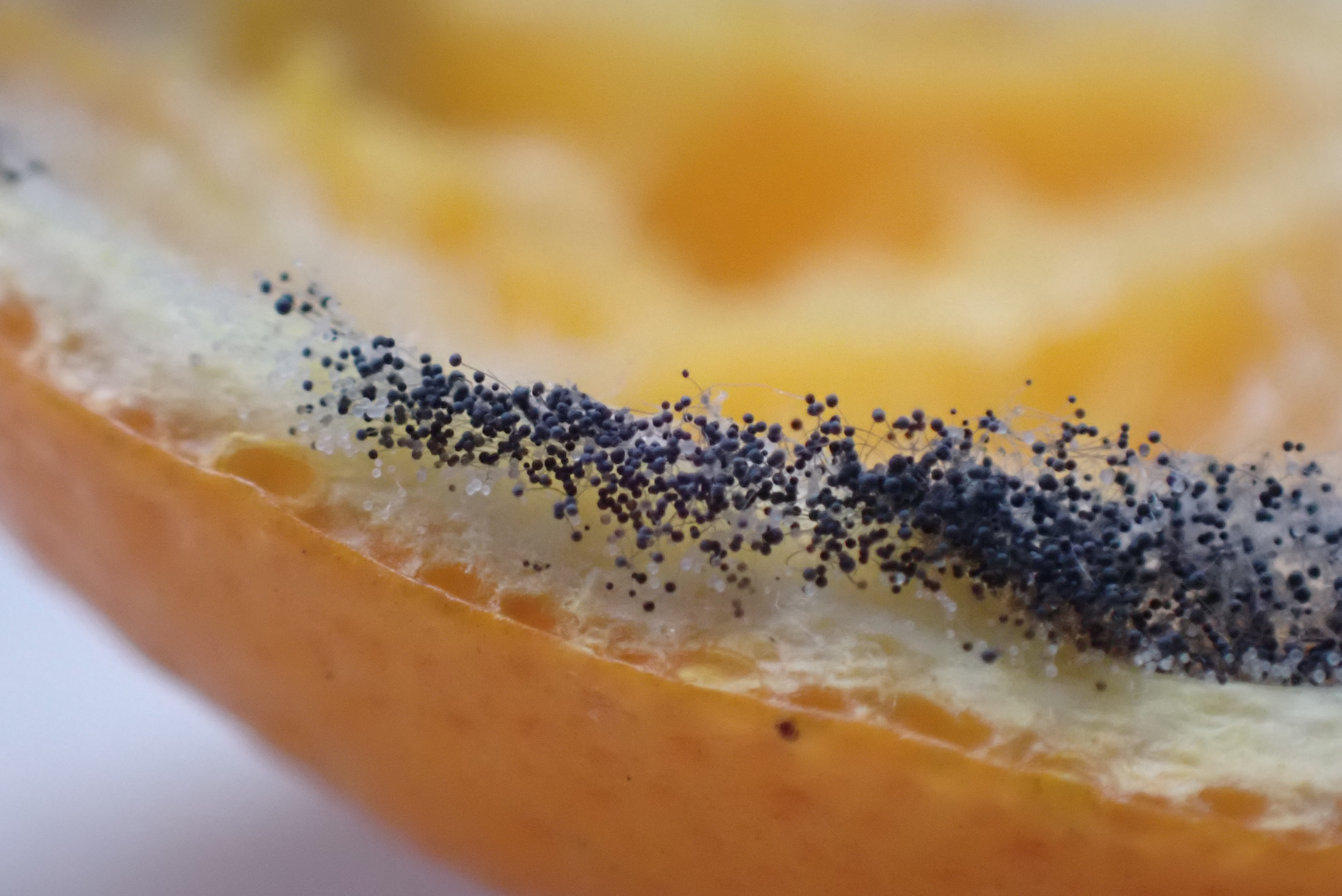
Fungus growing on the peel of an orange

Another type of fungi, yeast, which forms mainly in liquid environments and anaerobic conditions is used to break down foods with a high sugar compound in a manner similar to spoilage to produce various types of food and beverages, such as bread, yogurt, cider, and alcoholic beverages.

However, yeast is at a disadvantage in environments where bacteria are due to slower reproductive rate.

== Signs ==
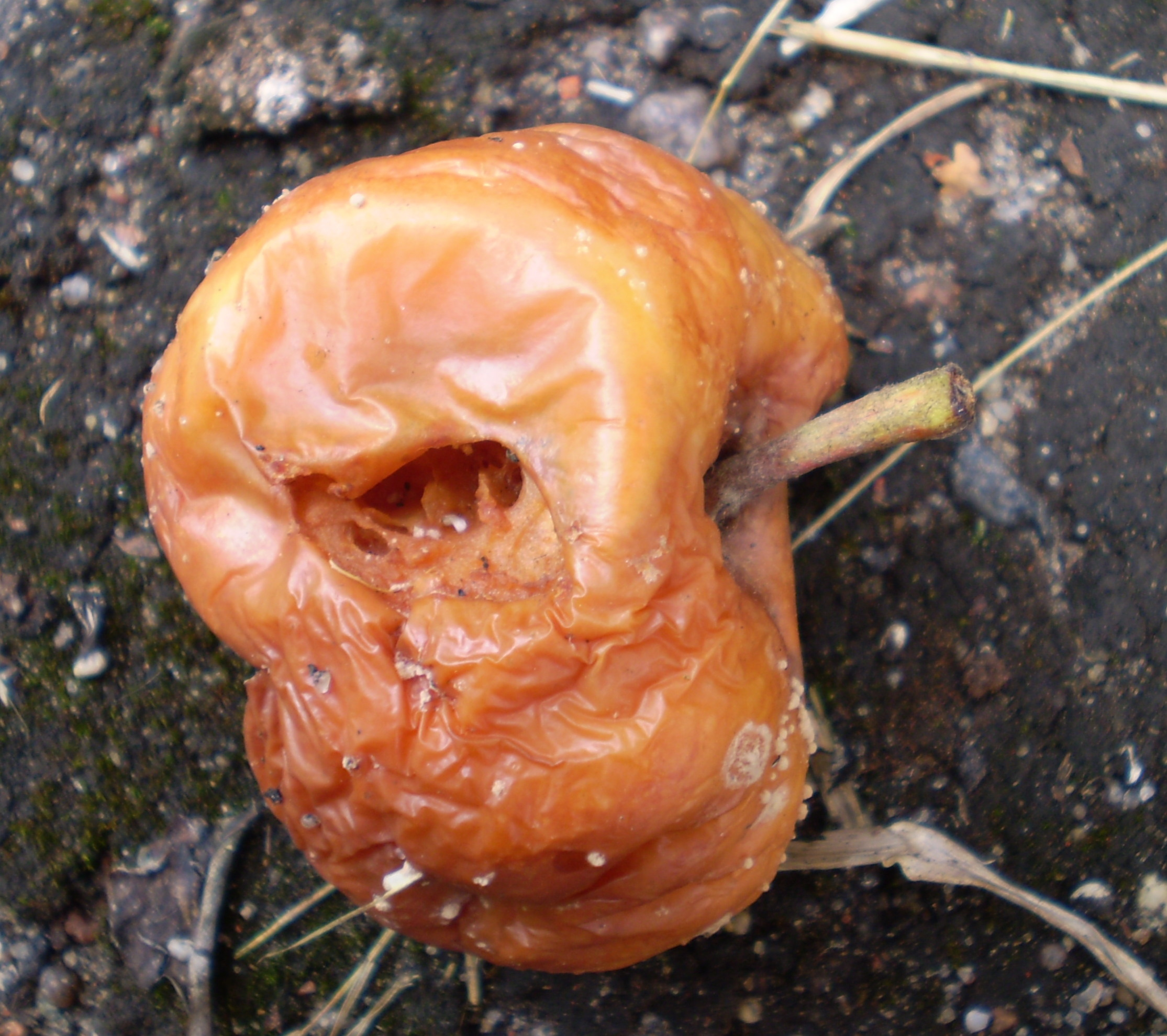
The process of decomposition beyond the point of human appeal

Signs of food spoilage may include an appearance different from the food in its fresh form, such as a change in color, a change in texture, an unpleasant odour, or an undesirable taste. The item may become softer than normal. If mold occurs, it is often visible externally on the item.

== Consequences ==
Though some bacteria responsible for spoilage are pathogenic, e.g. Clostridium perfringens and Bacillus cereus, bacteria that causes spoilage does not normally cause "food poisoning"; typically, the microorganisms that cause foodborne illnesses are odorless, flavourless, and otherwise undetectable outside the lab. However, spoiled food is not safe to eat due to the potential presence of mycotoxins and microbial waste.

== Prevention ==
A number of methods can be used either to delay and in some cases even totally prevent spoilage, or reduce food waste by minimizing the amount of food that is not consumed before it begins to spoil.

Dehydration, curing, canning, fermentation, refrigeration, pressurizing, and preservatives are some common methods to extend the shelf life of food and beverages, though for most items, not indefinitely.

Canned food has a particularly long shelf life as canning vacuum sealsed the food keeping out oxygen, which is needed by aerobic bacteria that spoil food. However, anaerobic bacteria like C. botulinum, which causes Botulism can still grow.

A food rotation system uses the first in first out method (FIFO), which ensures that the first item purchased is the first item consumed. Another way to keep food from spoiling is by following a four step system: Clean, Separate, Cook, Chill.

Food like meat, poultry, milk and cream should be kept out of the Danger Zone (between 4 and 60 °C (39 and 140 °F)) which allows bacteria to breed causing spoilage and potentially foodbourne illness if consumed.

== Detection ==
The detection of spoiled food is crucial in preventing foodborne illnesses.

Various sensors have been developed to detect the presence of metabolites, such as biological material or gasses, produced by bacteria or fungi, during the spoilage process.

Colorimetric analysis can also be used to detect biogenic amines, which are indicators of food spoilage.

These methods of detecting spoilage can be used in combination to provide more accurate results. They are still in research and development phase, and are not currently available for commercial use.

== See also ==
- Decomposition
- Food preservation
- Food grading
- Foodborne illness
- Shelf life
- Spoilage (wine)
- Meat spoilage
