= Cider =

Fermented alcoholic beverage from apple juice

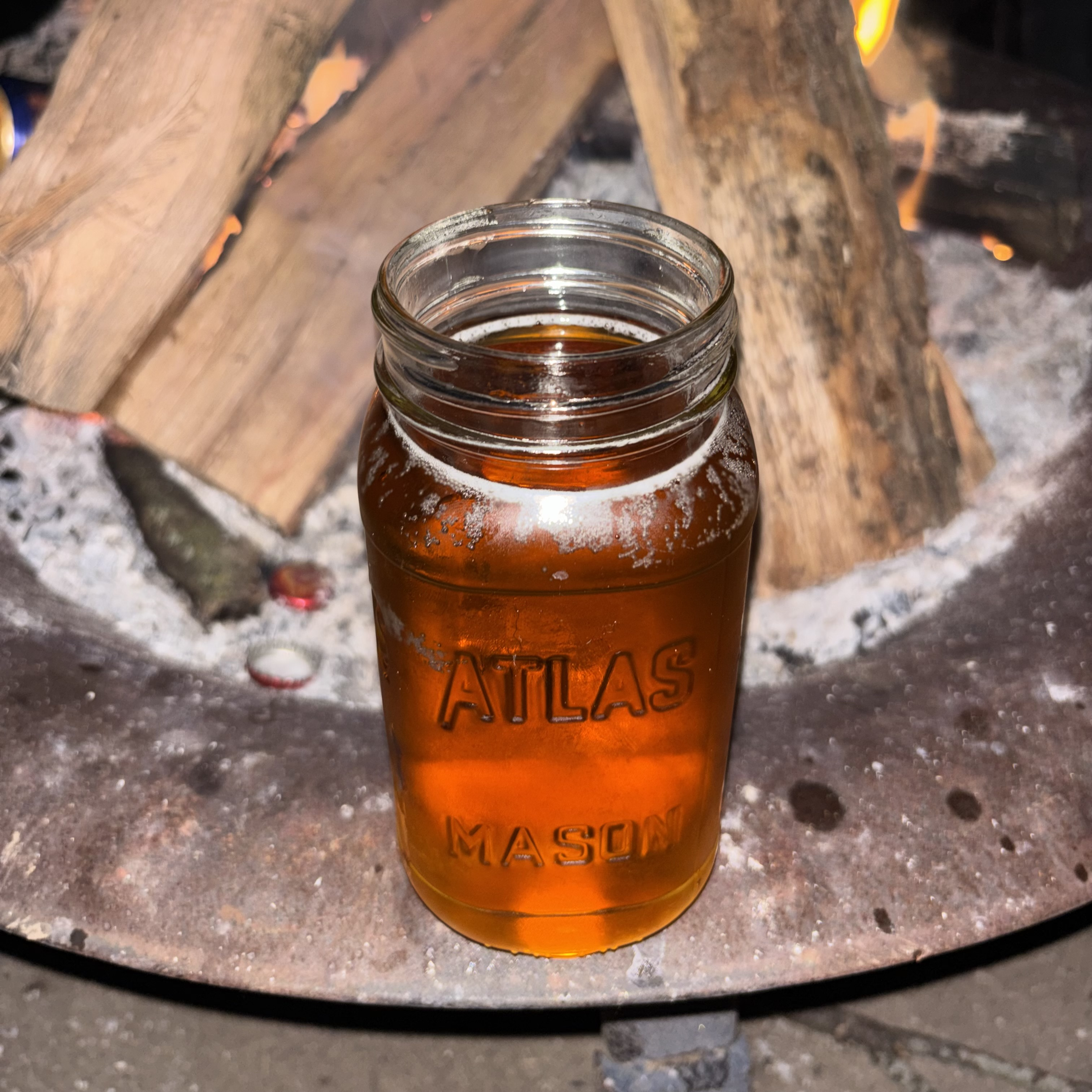
- American cider in a jar
- Type: Fermented alcoholic beverage
- Origin: Great Britain
- Alcohol by volume: 1.2–8.5% (traditional English), 3.5–12% (continental)
- Colour: Pale yellow, amber, brown
- Ingredients: Apples, yeast

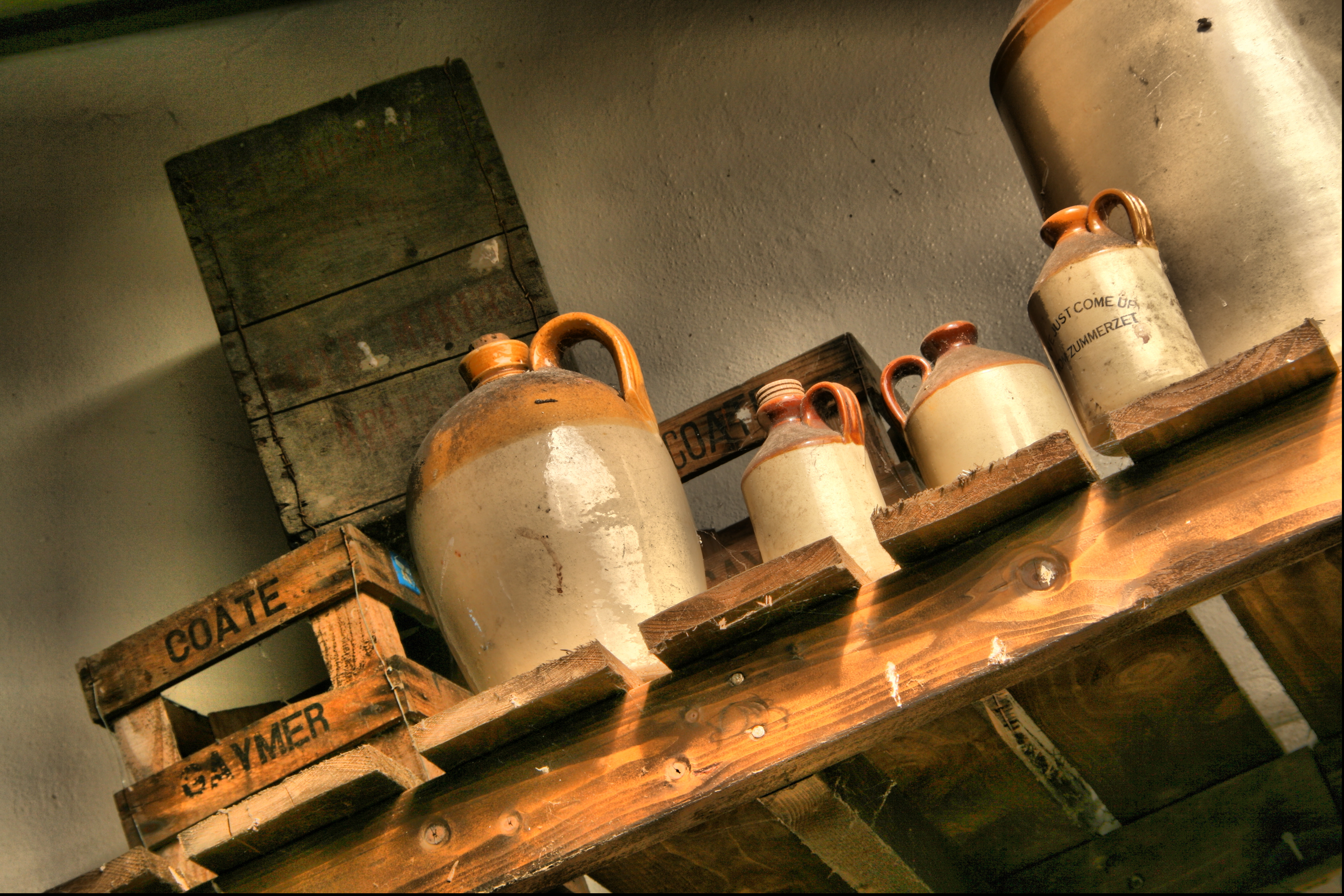
Cider jugs in Somerset, England

Cider (/ˈsaɪdər/ SY-dər) is an alcoholic beverage made from the fermented juice of apples. The juice of most varieties of apple (including crab apples) can be used to make cider, but cider apples are most desirable. The addition of sugar or extra fruit before a second fermentation increases the ethanol content of the resulting beverage.

Cider is widely available in Britain, particularly in the West Country, and Ireland. Together, they have the world's highest per capita consumption and the largest cider-producing companies. Ciders from the South West of England are generally higher in alcoholic content. Cider remains traditionally popular across the Anglosphere, such as India, South Africa, Canada, Australia, New Zealand, Hong Kong, and the United States (particularly in New England and the Midwest).

== Etymology ==
In Old English, an alcoholic beverage made from apples was simply called æppelwīn ("apple wine"). The word cider is first mentioned in Middle English in biblical use as sicer, ciser ("strong drink", "strong liquor") in the 13th century and as sither(e) / cidre "liquor made from the juice of fruits" → "beverage made from apples" in the 14th century. It was probably first borrowed from Old French primitive form sizre "fermented beverage" (Eadwine Psalter, LXVIII, 14) and then from another younger French form cistre, later sidre, cidre "beverage made from fruits".

The specific meaning "fermented beverage from apples" appears in Old French for the first time by the Norman chronicler Wace in 1130 / 1140 (Wace, conception de Nostre Dame). The Old French word *cisre (sizre) is from Gallo-Romance *cisera found in Medieval Latin by the English author Alexander Neckam (Neckam, De nominibus utensilium). It is an altered form of Church Latin sicera "fermented drink", itself borrowed from Greek sīkéra, ultimately from Hebrew šēkār, "intoxicating liquor".

The cognates in the different Romance languages : Spanish, Portuguese sidra, Italian sidro, etc., in the Germanic languages : German Zider, etc. are all from French and Breton chistr, Welsh seidr (through an English form) probably too. By the 19th century, in the United States, cider referred to the expressed juice of apples, either before fermentation as sweet cider, or after fermentation, a hard cider.

== Geography and origins ==
Cider is an ancient beverage. The first recorded reference to cider dates back to Julius Caesar's first attempt to invade Britain in 55 BCE, when he found the native Celts fermenting crabapples. He would take the discovery back through continental Europe with his retreating troops. In the cider market, ciders can be divided into two main styles: standard and speciality. The first group consists of modern ciders and heritage ciders. Modern ciders are produced from culinary apples such as Gala. Heritage ciders are produced from heritage, cider-specific, crab, or wild apples, like Golden Russet. Historically, cider was made from the only resources available to make it, so style was not a large factor when considering the production process. Apples were historically confined to the cooler climates of Western Europe and Britain, where record-keeping was not yet common. Cider was first made from crab apples, ancestors of the bittersweet and bittersharp apples used by today's English cider makers.

English cider featured a drier, higher-alcohol-content style, made in open fermentation vats from bittersweet crab apples. The French developed a sweet, low-alcohol "cidre" taking advantage of the sweeter apples and the keeving process. Cider styles evolved based on the methods used, the apples available and local tastes. Production techniques, as with most technology, were developed by trial and error. In fact, the variables were too numerous to track, including spontaneous fermentation, vessel types, environmental conditions, and apple varieties. Refinements came much later when cider became a commercial product, and the process was better understood. However, as cider popularity grows, the production of speciality styles has increased.

Cider alcohol content varies from 1.2% to 8.5% ABV or more in traditional English ciders, and 2.5% to 12% in continental ciders. In UK law, it must contain at least 35% apple juice (fresh or from concentrate), although CAMRA (the Campaign for Real Ale) says that "real cider" must be at least 90% fresh apple juice. In the US, there is a 50% minimum. In France, cider must be made solely from apples. Perry is a similar product to cider made by fermenting pear juice. Cider can be distilled into fruit brandy.

In the US and Canada, varieties of alcoholic cider are often called "hard cider" to distinguish it from non-alcoholic apple cider or "sweet cider", also made from apples at cider mills. In Canada, cider cannot contain less than 2.5% or over 13% absolute alcohol by volume.

== Appearance and types ==
The flavour of cider varies. Ciders can be classified from dry to sweet. Their appearance ranges from cloudy with sediment to completely clear, and their colour ranges from almost colourless to amber to brown. The variations in clarity and colour are mostly due to filtering between pressing and fermentation. Some apple varieties will produce a clear cider without any need for filtration. Both sparkling and still ciders are made; the sparkling variety is the more common.

Modern, mass-produced ciders closely resemble sparkling wine in appearance. More traditional brands tend to be darker and cloudier. They are often stronger than the mass-produced varieties and taste more strongly of apples. Almost colourless, white cider has the same apple juice content as conventional cider but is harder to make because the cider maker must blend various apples to achieve a clearer liquid. White ciders tend to be sweeter and more refreshing. They are typically 7–8% ABV in strength. Black cider, by contrast, is a dry amber cider with an alcohol content of 7–8% ABV.

== Cider styles ==
=== Modern ciders ===
Modern ciders are made from culinary apples and are lower in tannins and higher in acidity than other cider styles. Common culinary apples used in modern ciders include McIntosh, Golden Delicious, Jonagold, Granny Smith, Gala, and Fuji. A sweet or low alcohol cider may tend to have a strong aromatic and flavour character of apple, while drier and higher alcohol ciders will tend to produce a wider range of fruity aromas and flavours. Modern ciders vary in color from pale to yellow and can range from brilliant to a hazy clarity. Clarity can be altered through various cider-making practices, depending on the cider maker's intentions. There are even Rosé ciders made from apples with red skins and flesh.

=== Heritage ciders ===
Heritage ciders are made from both culinary and cider apples, including bittersweet, bittersharp, heirloom, wild, and crab apples. Common apples used in heritage cider production include Dabinett, Kingston Black, Roxbury Russet, and Wickson. Heritage ciders are higher in tannins than modern ciders. They range in colour from yellow to amber, from brilliant to hazy. Clarity of heritage ciders also depends on the cider-making practices used and will differ by cider maker as well.

In Canada, some cideries market "Loyalist-style" ciders, which are notably dry and made with McIntosh apples, a Canadian heritage varietal.

=== Speciality style ciders ===
Speciality-style ciders are open to much more manipulation than modern- or heritage-style ciders. There is no restriction on apple varieties used, and the list of speciality styles continues to expand. Listed on the USACM Cider Style Guide, speciality styles include: fruit, hopped, spiced, wood-aged, sour, and iced ciders. Fruit ciders have other fruit or juices added before or after fermentation, such as cherries, blueberries, and cranberries. Hopped cider is fermented with added hops, common hop varieties being Cascade, Citra, Galaxy, and Mosaic. Spiced ciders have various spices added to the cider before, during, or after fermentation. Spices like cinnamon and ginger are popular to use in production. Wood-aged ciders are ciders that are either fermented or aged in various types of wood barrels to aid in the extraction of woody, earthy flavours. Sour ciders are high-acid ciders that are produced with non-standard, non-Saccharomyces yeast and bacteria, which enhance acetic and lactic acid production, to reach a sour profile. Ice ciders can be made by using pre-pressed frozen juice or frozen whole apples. Whole apples either come from the orchard frozen, depending on the harvest date, or are stored in a freezer prior to pressing. When pre-pressed juice or whole apples freeze, sugars become concentrated and largely separate from the water. Whole apples are then pressed to extract the concentrated juice. For the pre-pressed juice, the concentrated solution is drawn off during thawing. However, according to the Alcohol and Tobacco Tax and Trade Bureau (TTB), cider producers may label a product 'Ice Cider' only if it is made from apples that are naturally frozen outdoors.

Two styles not mentioned in the USACM Cider Style Guide are Rosé and Sparkling Cider. Rosé cider can be produced from apple varieties that have reddish-pink pulp, like Pink Pearl and Amour Rouge. Rosé ciders can also be created through the addition of food-grade red dyes, previously used red grape skins, like Marquette with high anthocyanin concentration, red fruits, rose petals, or hibiscus. Lastly, sparkling ciders can be produced through methods of direct carbonation, addition of carbon dioxide (CO_{2}), or by Méthode Champenoise to re-create the traditional Champagne style.

=== Specific cider styles ===
Specific cider style	Clarity	Color	Apple type	Adjuncts	Alcohol by volume (ABV)
New World	Clear to brilliant	Pale to medium gold	Culinary, wild, crabapples	None	5–8%
English	Slightly cloudy to brilliant	Medium yellow to amber	Bittersweet, bittersharp	None	6–9%
French	Clear to brilliant	Medium yellow to amber	Bittersweet, bittersharp	None	3–6%
New England	Clear to brilliant	Pale to medium yellow	New England	None	7–13%
Applewine	Clear to brilliant	Pale to medium gold	Unspecified apple types	None	9–12%
Cider with other fruit	Clear to brilliant	Color varies, color additives appropriate to appearance of added fruit	Unspecified apple types	Fruit or fruit juice	9–12%
Ice cider	Brilliant	Gold to amber	Unspecified apple types; fruit is frozen prior to pressing or a frozen juice concentrate is used	None	7–13%
Cider with herbs/spices	Clear to brilliant	Color varies, color additives appropriate to appearance of added botanicals	Unspecified apple types	Herbs and spices	5–9%
White	Clear to brilliant	Very pale, nearly clear	Apples with pale juice, juice decolorised with charcoal filter	None	6.5–8.4%
Black	Unspecified	Range of amber shades	Unspecified apple types	Hops, malted barley	Unspecified

== Production ==
=== Crushing and pressing ===
Apples grown for consumption are suitable for cider making, though some regional cider-makers prefer to use a mix of eating and cider apples (as in Kent, England), or exclusively cider apples (as in the West Country, England and West of England). There are hundreds of cultivars developed specifically for cider making.

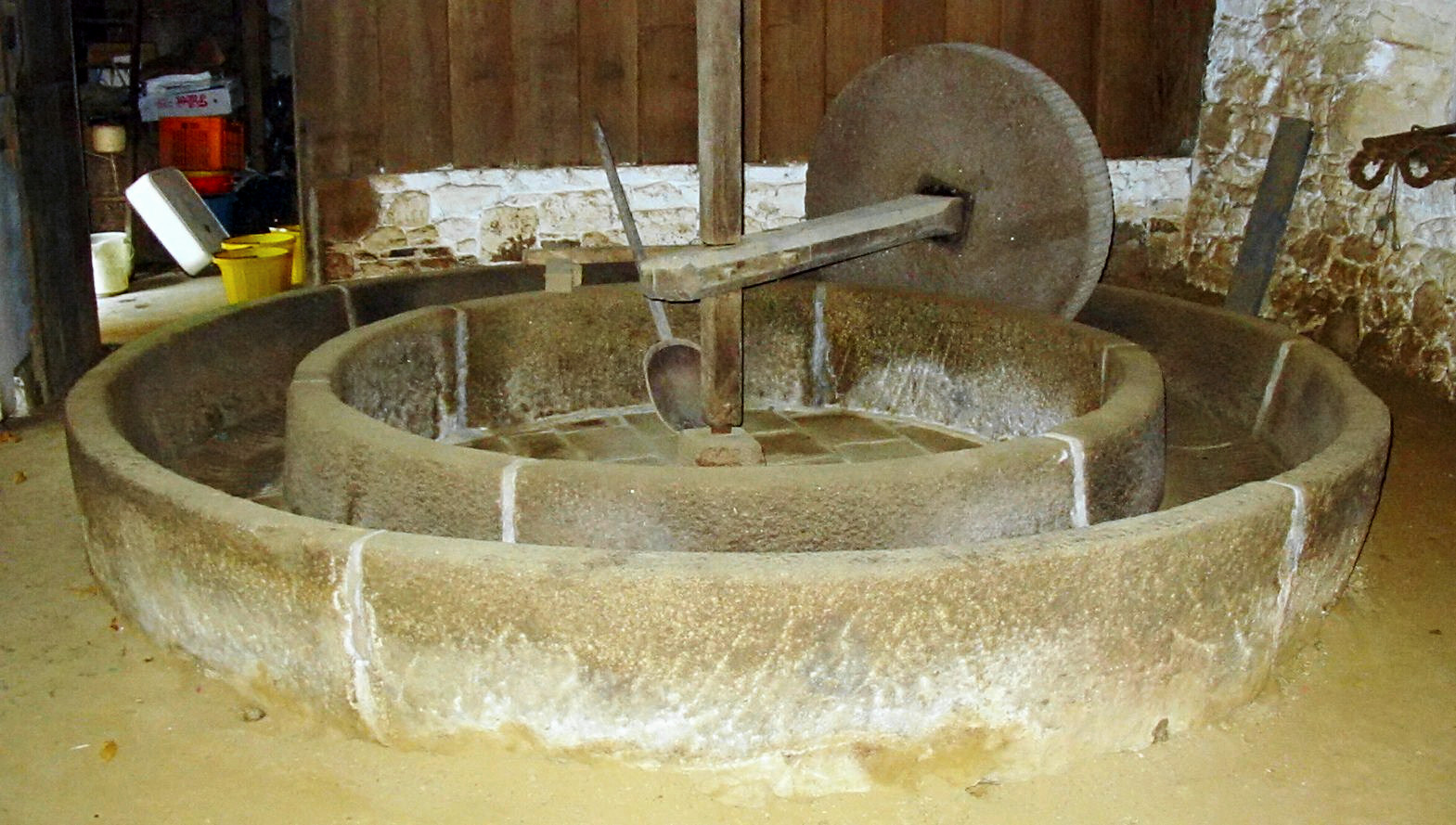
Few traditional horse-drawn circular cider presses are still in use. Many may still be seen used as garden ornaments, flower planters, or architectural features.

Once the apples are gathered from trees in orchards, they are scratted (ground down) into a pulp. Historically, this was done using pressing stones with circular troughs, or by a cider mill. Cider mills were traditionally driven by hand, water, or horsepower. In modern times, they are likely to be powered by electricity. The pulp is then transferred to a cider press where the juice is extracted.

Traditionally, the method for squeezing juice from apple pulp involves placing a sweet straw or haircloth between stacked layers of apple pulp. Today, apples can be quickly pressed on a mechanised belt press. The juice, after being strained through a coarse hair sieve, is then put into either open vats or closed casks. The remaining solids (pomace) are given to farm animals as winter feed, composted, discarded or used to make liqueurs.

=== Fermentation ===
Fermentation of cider occurs by a mechanism very similar to that of wine. The process of alcoholic fermentation is characterised by the conversion of simple sugars into ethanol by yeasts, especially Saccharomyces cerevisiae. This is because, as "Crabtree positive" yeasts, they produce ethanol even during aerobic fermentation; in contrast, Crabtree-negative yeasts produce only biomass and carbon dioxide. This adaptation gives them a competitive edge in cider fermentation due to their high alcohol tolerance. Because of this tolerance, it is common for ciders to be fermented to dryness, though not always. Fermentations will carry on until the fermentation is stopped or the yeasts run out of nutrients and can no longer metabolise, resulting in a "stuck" fermentation.

Steps taken before fermentation might include fruit or juice blending, titratable acidity and pH measurements and sometimes adjustments, and sulfur dioxide and yeast additions. Fermentation is carried out at a temperature of 4–16 °C (39–61 °F). This temperature would be low for most kinds of fermentation, but is beneficial for cider, as it leads to slower fermentation with less loss of delicate aromas. Fermentation can occur due to natural yeasts present in the must; alternatively, some cider makers add cultivated strains of cider yeast, such as Saccharomyces bayanus.

During the initial stages of fermentation, carbon dioxide levels rise as the yeasts multiply and begin to convert sugar into ethanol. In addition to the fermentative metabolism of yeast, certain organoleptic compounds are formed that affect cider quality, such as alcohols, esters, and other volatile compounds. After fermentation, racking occurs into a clean vessel, trying to leave behind as much yeast as possible. Shortly before the fermentation consumes all the sugar, the liquor is "racked" (siphoned) into new vats. This leaves dead yeast cells and other undesirable material at the bottom of the old vat. At this point, it is important to exclude airborne acetic bacteria, so vats are filled completely to prevent air from entering. The fermentation of the remaining available sugar produces a small amount of carbon dioxide, which forms a protective layer that reduces contact with air. This final fermentation creates a small amount of carbonation. Extra sugar may be added specifically for this purpose. Racking is sometimes repeated if the liquor remains too cloudy.

Apple-based juice may also be combined with fruit to make a fine cider; fruit purées or flavourings can be added, such as grape, cherry, raspberry or cranberry.

The cider is ready to drink after a three-month fermentation period, although it is more often matured in the vats for up to three years.

=== Blending and bottling ===
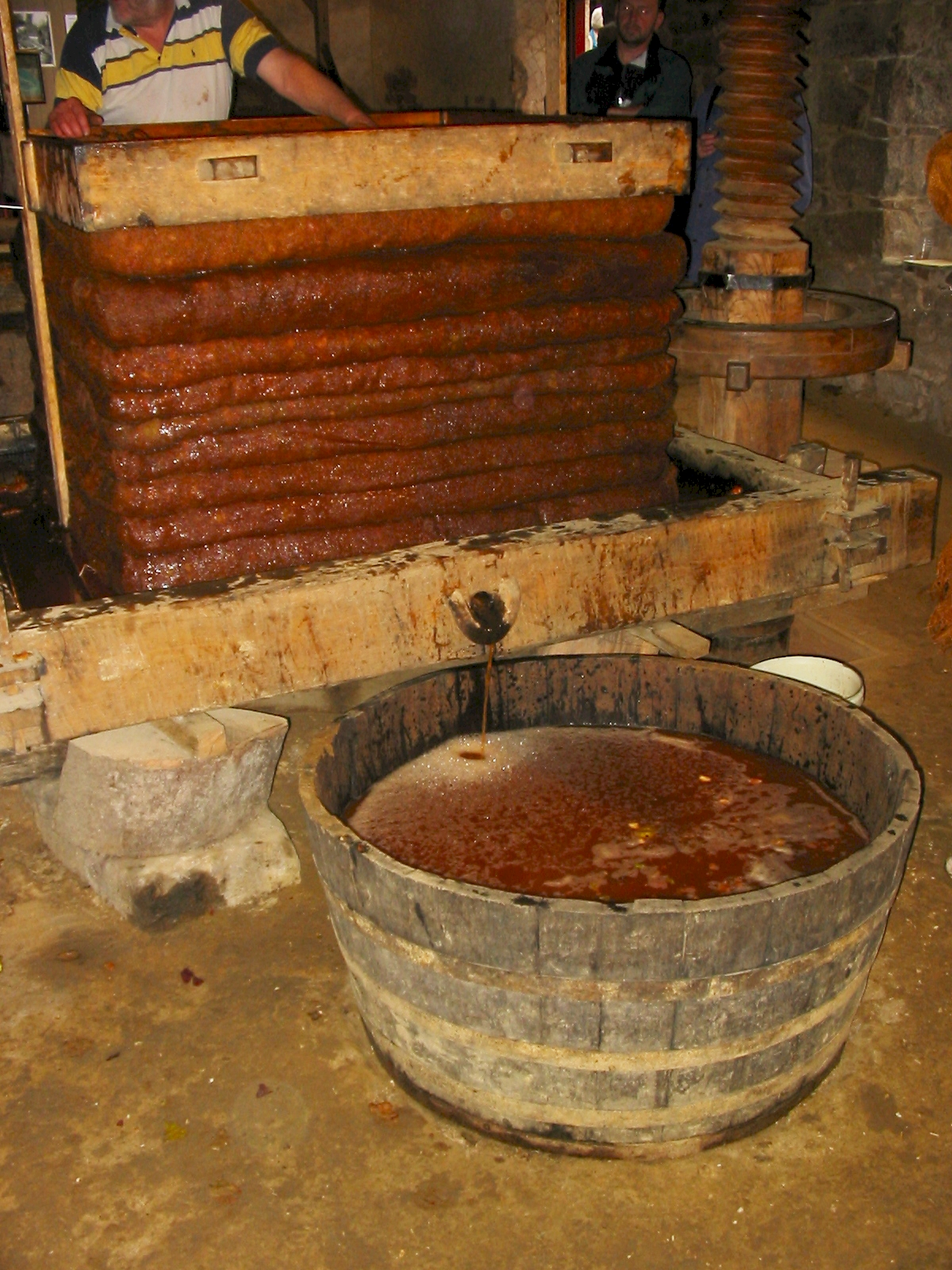
Layers of pomace wrapped in canvas

For larger-scale cider production, ciders from vats made from different apple varieties may be blended to suit market taste. If the cider is to be bottled, usually some extra sugar is added for sparkle. Higher-quality ciders can be made using the champagne method, but it is time-consuming and expensive and requires special corks, bottles, and other equipment. Some home brewers use beer bottles, which work perfectly well and are inexpensive. This allows the cider to become naturally carbonated.

=== Distillation ===
When distilled, cider turns into fruit brandy or Applejack which is the traditional North American cider distillate.

== Chemistry ==
=== Flavour compounds ===
Tannins are crucial flavour compounds in cider. Since perfecting the tannin content in the cider is needed for optimal success, the tannins or "polyphenols of apples are largely implicated in cider quality." They are important because they control the astringency and bitterness of the cider. Tannins are important to consider when producing cider because the length of the aftertaste (astringency) and bitterness are both strong factors that affect people's opinion of the cider. Tannins are naturally occurring polyphenol compounds in apples. Depending on the type of cider apple the producer uses, tannin levels will vary. The more well-known ciders typically have lower tannin levels, while traditional ciders have higher tannin levels. One example of a common tannin present in cider is Procyanidin B2.

The acids in cider play a vital role in both the cider-making process and the final flavour of the finished cider. They are present in both apples and cider, adding a sour taste and a pungent odour to each. Acids also serve as a preservative in the cider since microbes grow less in lower pH environments and contribute to the fermentation process. Most ciders have a pH of between 3.3 and 4.1. The primary acid found in apples is malic acid which accounts for around 90% of the acid content in apples. Malic acid contributes to the tart and sour flavours found in cider, and typically between 4.5 and 7.5 grams of malic acid per litre of cider is preferred. Malic acid is also used to determine apple ripeness for harvesting, as its concentration decreases as the fruit ripens. Lactic acid is also commonly found in cider, and it is mainly formed from malolactic fermentation, a process that converts malic acid into lactic acid. This process rounds out the flavour of the cider while reducing a lot of the acidity and producing carbon dioxide as well. Other acids such as citric acid can be used to add taste after fermentation, but these acids are not typically found in high concentration in apples naturally.

Most of the natural sugars in apples are consumed during fermentation and converted into alcohol and carbon dioxide. If the fermentation goes all the way, the cider will have no perceivable residual sugar and be dry. This means that the cider will not taste sweet and might show more bitterness or acidity. Ciders are made in many parts of Europe and the United States, and each country has its own cider varieties with distinct flavour compounds. Keeving is a traditional method of fermentation with low amounts of nitrogen in French and English ciders that is intended to slow down the rate of fermentation in hopes of retaining high esters as well as retaining some residual sugar in the bottled cider to increase effervescence in the ageing process. Ciders can be back sweetened, after fermentation is complete to add a sweet taste and balance out acids, tannins, and bitterness. Natural sugar can be used, but this can restart fermentation in a bottle if not filtered correctly. Artificial sweeteners can be used which are non-fermentable but some of these create an aftertaste, such as saccharin or sucralose, yet some of these are known for adding off flavour compounds.

In 2014, a study found that a 1-US-pint (470 ml) bottle of mass-market cider contained 20.5 g (five teaspoons) of sugar, nearly the amount the WHO recommends as an adult's daily allowance of added sugar, and 5–10 times the amount of sugar in lager or ale.

=== Apples to cider ===
An important component in cider-making is the addition of sulfur dioxide to inhibit the growth of many spoilage bacteria or yeasts in the juice. This encourages the inoculated yeast to dominate the juice environment, converting sugars to alcohol. Once sulfur dioxide dissolves in the juice, it converts into a pH-dependent mixture of bisulfite, sulfite ions, and molecular sulfur dioxide. The "unbound" sulfur dioxide provides the antimicrobial environment in the juice, while the bisulfite and sulfite ions contribute to flavour. The amount of sulfur dioxide needed to inhibit microbial activity is directly related to the juice's pH: lower pH requires less, while higher pH requires more. Many cider producers add sulfur dioxide immediately after pressing and juicing, but before fermentation. However, in some cases, it can be added afterwards to act as an antioxidant or stabiliser. This prevents the finished cider from releasing hydrogen peroxide or aldehydes that produce "off" odors and flavours.

Nitrogen is also a very important nutrient supporting yeast growth and fermentation in cider. Yeast require different forms of nitrogen to take up and use themselves so nitrogenous compounds are often added to apple juice. The mixture of nitrogen-containing compounds that yeast can use are referred to as 'Yeast Assimilable Nitrogen', or YAN. Even though YAN can be added to juice before fermentation, there are other ways to influence nitrogen levels in the juice before pressing, such as the orchard's maturity or the type of fertiliser used. Using a fertiliser with a good amount of nitrogen will help the roots of apple trees; nitrogen fixing bacteria on the roots will be able to provide the tree with more nitrogen that will be able to make its way into the fruit. A low crop load can also yield juices with more YAN than a high crop load because the nitrogen is more concentrated in the low number of apples instead of being distributed to many apples. While a sufficient amount of YAN is good for the yeast and ensures fermentation of the sugars in the juice to alcohol, some cider makers may choose to limit nitrogen because it is the limiting factor. When the yeast are starved for nitrogen, they stop fermenting and die off. This can be desirable if cider makers prefer their cider to have some more sugar than alcohol in their cider. However, limiting YAN should be done in moderation, as too little nitrogen can increase hydrogen sulfide (H_{2}S) production, which causes a rotten-egg-like smell.

Primary cider fermentation can be initiated by inoculating the cider must with selected yeast strains or by allowing indigenous yeast strains present on the fruit and in the cider production equipment to begin fermentation spontaneously. Inoculation with different strains of Saccharomyces cerevisiae and other yeast strains with strong fermentative metabolism traits, including Saccharomyces bayanus and Torulaspora delbrueckii strains, has been shown to produce few differences in cider phenolic compounds, save for concentrations of phloretin (see Phloretin) in samples that underwent malolactic fermentation. Spontaneous fermentation commenced by indigenous yeasts and finished by Saccharomyces cerevisiae can produce ciders with similar concentrations of important non-volatile acids, including lactic acid, succinic acid and acetic acid, while concentrations of volatile compounds such as methanol and 1-butanol were present in different concentrations, dependent on apple cultivar. Extending the time the cider remains in contact with yeast lees increased the concentrations of most minor volatile compounds, especially fatty acids, ethyl esters, and alcohols. Major volatile compound concentrations did not exhibit a similar pattern, with iso-butanol, amyl alcohols, and acetone decreasing, and 1-propanol decreasing.

Sparkling ciders can be produced using different methods, including the Traditional method used to produce champagne. Use of different strains of indigenous Saccharomyces to perform secondary fermentation produced ciders with consistent alcohol and acidic characteristics, variable glycerol, acetaldehyde, ethyl acetate, methanol, propanol, i-butanol, and 2-phenylethanol characteristics, and acceptable sensory analysis results.

== Yeast ==
The selection of yeast used for cider production is critical to the quality of the final product. As with other fermented beverages such as wine and beer, the yeast strain used in alcoholic fermentation also converts precursor molecules into the odorants found in the final product. In general, two broad categories of yeast are used for cider making: commercially developed strains and wild (autochthonous) strains. In either case, the species tend to be either Saccharomyces cerevisiae or Saccharomyces bayanus. Commercial strains are available for purchase from numerous distributors, and their characteristics are typically outlined in the companies' manuals. Selection for fermentation may be based on a yeast's ability to ferment at specific sugar concentrations, temperatures, or pH levels. Some producers may also select for yeasts that produce killer factors, allowing them to outcompete other yeasts in the juice, or for yeasts that contribute mouthfeel or specific aromas to the cider.

"Wild fermentations" occur when autochthonous yeasts are allowed to ferment; indigenous yeasts can spontaneously initiate fermentation without the cider maker adding any other yeast strains. Autochthonous yeasts are wild yeast strains endemic to the specific location where a cider is produced; this is the traditional method used in cider making, and many producers feel that the strains unique to their cidery contribute a sense of terroir to their product. Wild yeast populations can be incredibly diverse and commonly include species of Saccharomyces, Candida, Pichia, Hanseniaspora and Metschnikowia. Typically, the native yeast take up residence in the cidery, and can be important to the unique flavour of the product. Although it was once believed that the native yeast carrying out these spontaneous fermentations also came from the orchard itself, research has shown that the microbes cultured from apples in the orchard do not align with the microbes found during the various stages of fermentation, suggesting that the sole source of native yeast is the cidery. Indigenous yeast strain population dynamics are affected by climatic conditions, apple variety, geographic location, and cider making technologies used. These variables lead to different regions hosting unique endemic yeast populations. The particular composition of endemic yeast strains and the yeast's activity during fermentation are responsible for the unique characteristics of ciders produced in certain regions. Unique autochthonous yeast populations promote different compositions of volatile flavour compounds, which form distinct tastes, aromas, and mouthfeel in finished ciders. Using wild yeast populations for fermentation introduces variability to the cider-making process that makes it more difficult to generate multiple batches of cider that retain consistent characteristics.

Aside from carrying out the primary fermentation of cider, yeast may also play other roles in cider production. The production of sparkling cider requires a second round of fermentation and a second yeast selection. The yeast used for the secondary fermentation in sparkling cider production serves the same purpose as the yeast used in the champagne method of sparkling wine production: to generate carbonation and distinct aromas through fermentation in the bottle. The yeast is selected based on critical properties, such as tolerance to high pressure, low temperature, and high ethanol concentration, as well as the ability to flocculate, which allows riddling to remove the yeast when fermentation has finished. Some researchers have also suggested that non-Saccharomyces yeasts could be used to release additional flavour or mouthfeel compounds, as they may contain enzymes, such as β-glucosidase, β-xylosidase, or polygalacturonase, which Saccharomyces yeast may not produce.

Not all yeasts associated with cider production are necessary for fermentation; many are considered spoilage microbes and can be a significant source of off-flavours in the finished product. Brettanomyces species produce volatile phenols, especially 4-ethyl phenol, which impart a distinct aroma called "Bretty", typically described as "barnyard", "horsey", or "bandaid". While these aromas would be considered spoilage odors in wines, many cider producers and consumers do not consider them a fault. Yeast species like Hanseniaspora uvarum, Metschnikowia pulcherrima, Saccharomyces uvarum, Zygosaccharomyces cidri, Candida pomicole, and Pichia membranifaciens have also been found to produce enzymes linked to the generation of spoilage odors.

== Festivals ==
The western British tradition of wassailing the apple trees and making an offering of cider and bread in January to protect the fertility of the orchard appears to be relatively ancient, superficially dating back to the pre-Christian Early Medieval period. The autumn tradition of 'bobbing' stems from the abundance of apples at this time of year.

A modern cider festival is an organised event that promotes cider and (usually) perry. A variety of ciders and perries will be available for tasting and buying. Such festivals may be organised by pubs, cider producers, or cider-promoting private organisations.

== Variations and related drinks ==
In addition to the UK and its former colonies, cider is popular in France (particularly Normandy and Brittany), Portugal (mainly in Minho and Madeira), northern Italy (specifically Friuli), and northern Spain (specifically Asturias, Basque Country). Due to fermentation, ciders can be thought of as a fruit wine made from apples, though the exact definitions of either beverage can vary by culture. Germany also has its own types of cider, with Rhineland-Palatinate and Hesse producing a particularly tart version known as Apfelwein.

Calvados and applejack are strong liquors distilled from cider. They differ in their geographical origin and their method of distillation.

Calvados is made throughout Normandy, not just in the Calvados département. It is made from cider by double distillation. In the first pass, the result is a liquid containing 28–30% alcohol. After the second pass, the concentration of alcohol is about 40%.

Applejack is a strong alcoholic beverage made in North America by concentrating cider, either by the traditional method of freeze distillation or by true evaporative distillation. In traditional freeze distillation, a barrel of cider is left outside during the winter. When the temperature is low enough, the water in the cider starts to freeze. If the ice is removed, the (now more concentrated) alcoholic solution is left behind in the barrel. If the process is repeated often enough, and the temperature is low enough, the alcohol concentration is raised to 20–30% alcohol by volume. Home production of applejack is popular in Europe.

Ice cider (French: cidre de glace), originating in Quebec and inspired by ice wine, has become a Canadian speciality and is now also produced in England. For this product, the apples are frozen either before or after being harvested. Its alcohol concentration is 9–13% ABV. Cidre de glace is considered a local speciality in Quebec and can fetch high prices on the international market. In Canada, ice cider is produced by natural, outdoor freezing. In Europe and the United States, a similar product may be achieved through artificial, interior freezing, though it is often not called 'ice cider.'

Pommeau, a popular apéritif in Normandy, is a drink produced by blending unfermented apple juice and apple brandy in the barrel (the high alcoholic content of the spirit prevents fermentation of the juice, and the blend takes on the character of the aged barrel).

Cocktails may include cider. Besides kir and snakebite, another example is Black Velvet, in which cider may replace champagne.

Cider may also be used to make vinegar. Apple cider vinegar is noted for its high acidity and flavour.

Other fruits can be used to make cider-like drinks. The most popular is made from fermented pear juice, known as perry. It is called poiré in France and produced mostly in Lower Normandy there. A branded sweet perry known as Babycham, marketed principally as a women's drink and sold in miniature champagne-style bottles, was once popular in the UK but has become unfashionable. Another related drink is a form of mead known as cyser. Cyser is a blend of honey and apple juice fermented together.

Although not widely made today, various other pome fruits can be used to produce palatable drinks. Apicius, in Book II of De re coquinaria, includes a recipe calling for quince cider.

== National varieties ==
=== Europe ===
Before the development of rapid long-distance transportation, regions of cider consumption generally coincided with those of cider production. As such, cider was said to be more common than wine in 12th-century Galicia and certainly the idea of it was present in England by the Conquest of 1066, using crab apples: the word "Wassail" is derived from a Saxon phrase, "wæs hæil": it is what would have been said by Saxons as a toast at Yuletide. Southern Italy, by contrast, though indeed possessing apples, had no tradition for cider apples at all and, like its other neighbours on the Mediterranean Sea, preserved the Roman tradition of apples as an ingredient for desserts, as evidenced by the frescoes at Herculaneum and Pompeii, descriptions by Classical writers and playwrights, and Apicius, whose famous cookbook does not contain a single recipe for fermenting apples but rather includes them as part of main courses, especially accompanying pork.

==== Austria ====
In Austria, cider is made in the southwest of Lower Austria, the so-called "Mostviertel", in Upper Austria, and in parts of Styria. Almost every farmer there has some apple or pear trees. Many farmers also have a kind of inn called a "Mostheuriger", similar to a heuriger for new wine, where they serve cider and traditional fare. Non-sparkling cider is typically called "Most". Austria's most popular sparkling cider, Goldkehlchen, is produced in south Styria and has been marketed internationally since 2013 by the company founders, Adam and Eva.

==== Belgium ====
Cidrerie Ruwet SA, established in 1898, is the only independent craft cider producer in Belgium. In addition to its own brand Ruwet, the company produces 'high-end' ciders for private labels.

Heineken owns the other Belgian cider maker, Stassen SA, which, in addition to its own local brands such as Strassen X Cider, also produces Strongbow Jacques, a 5.5% ABV cider with cherry, raspberry, and blackcurrant flavours. Zonhoven-based Konings NV specialises in private-label ciders for European retailers and offers a wide range of flavours and packaging options to the beverage industry. Stella Artois Cidre is produced in Zonhoven and has been marketed since 2011.

==== Denmark ====
Despite a strong apple tradition, Denmark has little cider production. Six places that produce cider in Denmark are Pomona (since 2003), Fejø Cider (since 2003), Dancider (since 2004), Ørbæk Bryggeri (since 2006), Ciderprojektet (since 2008), and Svaneke Bryghus (since 2009). All are inspired mainly by English and French cider styles. The assortment of imported ciders has grown significantly since 2000; prior to that, only ciders from Sweden, primarily non-alcoholic, were generally available. The leading cider on the Danish market is made by CULT A/S. In 2008, Carlsberg launched an alcoholic cider in Denmark called Somersby cider, which has an alcohol content of 4.7% and a sweet taste.

==== Finland ====
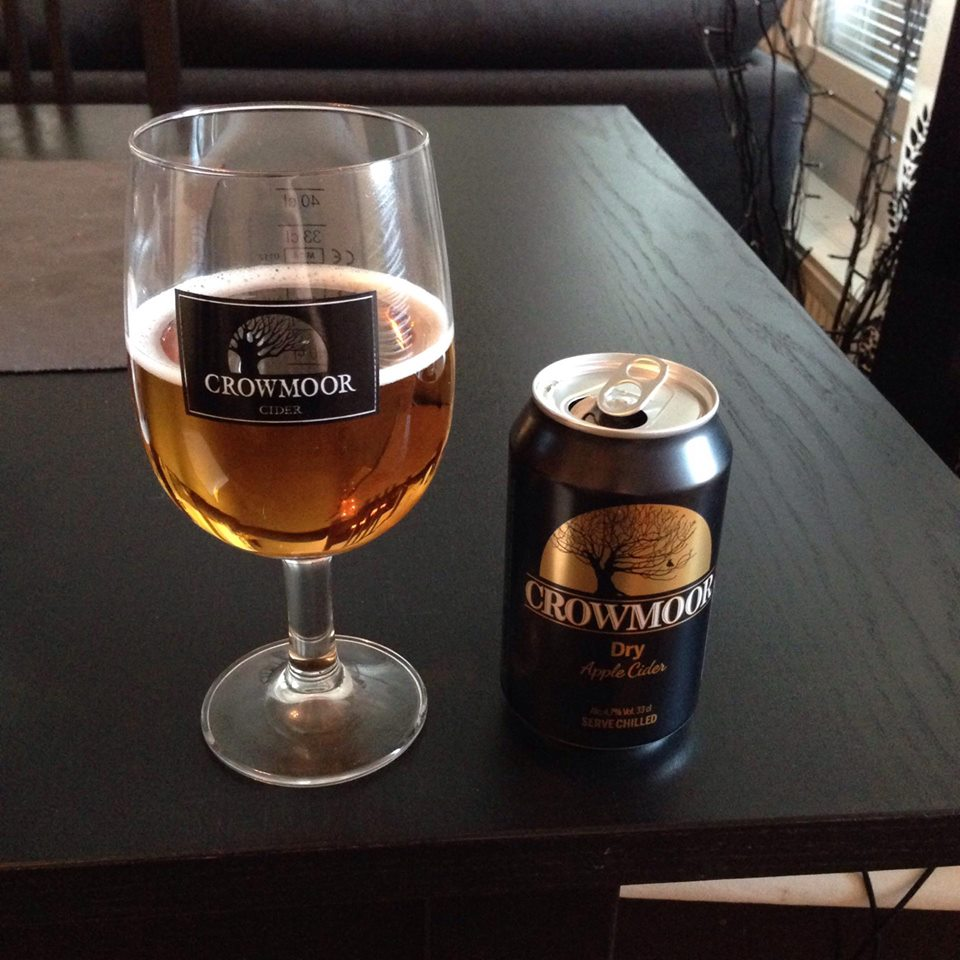
Sinebrychoff's Crowmoor cider (Finland)

The best-known brands labelled as cider are Golden Cap, Fizz, and Upcider. They typically contain 4.5–4.7% alcohol by volume. Virtually all Finnish "cider" is produced from fermented apple (or pear) juice concentrate mixed with water and is not cider by the traditional definition of the drink. Flavoured ciders, available in a wide selection, are very popular and widely available in stores, with flavours ranging from forest berry to rhubarb to vanilla.

==== France ====
France was one of the countries that inherited knowledge of apple cultivation from both the Celtic Gauls and the later Romans, who ruled the country for approximately 500 years; both had knowledge of grafting and apple cultivation. The earliest mentions of cider in this country date back to the Greek geographer Strabo, who speaks of the profusion of apple trees in Gaul and describes a cider-like drink.

In the 9th century, Charlemagne, in the Capitulars, ordered skilled brewers (the Sicetores) to always be present on his estates to make him ale, "pommé" (pomacium), perry and all the liquors liable to be used as drinks, and also ordered an expansion of planting apple trees in what is now Northern France.

French cidre (French pronunciation: [sidʁ]) is an alcoholic drink produced predominantly in Normandy and Brittany. It varies in strength from below 4% alcohol to well above 4%. Cidre Doux is a sweet cider, typically up to 3% ABV. 'Demi-Sec' is 3–5% alcohol, and Cidre Brut is a strong dry cider at 4.5% alcohol or higher. Most French ciders are sparkling. Higher-quality cider is sold in champagne-style bottles (cidre bouché). Many ciders are sold in corked bottles, but some are sold in screw-top bottles. In crêperies (crêpe restaurants) in Brittany, cider is generally served in traditional ceramic bowls (or wide cups) rather than glasses. A kir Breton (or kir normand) is a cocktail apéritif made with cider and cassis, rather than with white wine and cassis, as in the traditional kir. The Domfrontais, in the Orne (Basse-Normandie), is famous for its pear cider (poiré). The calvados du Domfrontais is made from cider and poiré.

Some cider is also made in southwestern France, in the French part of the Basque Country. It is a traditional drink there and is making a recovery. Ciders produced here are generally of the style seen in the Spanish part of the Basque Country. A recently popular variety is the Akived, a piquant drink served cold.

Calvados, from Normandy, and Lambig from Brittany are spirits made of cider through a process called double distillation. In the first pass, the result is a liquid containing 28%–30% alcohol. In a second pass, the amount of alcohol is augmented to about 40%.

==== Germany ====
German cider, usually called Apfelwein (apple wine), and regionally known as Ebbelwoi, Apfelmost (apple must), Viez (from Latin vice, the second or substitute wine), or Saurer Most (sour must), has an alcohol content of 5.5–7% and a tart, sour taste.

German cider is mainly produced and consumed in Hessen, particularly in the Frankfurt, Wetterau, and Odenwald areas, in Moselfranken, Merzig (Saarland) and the Trier area, as well as the lower Saar area and the region bordering on Luxembourg and in the area along the Neckar River in Swabia. In these regions, several large producers, as well as numerous small, private producers, often use traditional recipes. An official Viez route, or cider route, connects Saarburg to the border with Luxembourg.

==== Ireland ====
Cider is a popular drink in Ireland. A single cider, Bulmers, dominates sales in Ireland: owned by C&C and produced in Clonmel, County Tipperary, Bulmers has a connected history to the British Bulmers cider brand up until 1949. Outside the Republic of Ireland, C&C brands their cider as Magners. It is very popular in Ireland to drink cider over ice, and this is encouraged in its advertising. Cidona, a non-alcoholic version of Bulmers, is a popular soft drink in Ireland and was once a C&C-owned brand. However, in recent years, other ciders have begun to take a large share in the market, for example, Heineken's 'Orchard Thieves'.

There has been a renaissance among small artisanal cider producers since 2010. These now number more than a dozen across the island of Ireland and offer consumers a broad range of typically non-mainstream flavour profiles.

==== Italy ====
Cider was once widely produced in northern Italy's apple-growing regions, with a marked decline during fascist rule, due to the introduction of a law banning the industrial production of alcoholic beverages derived from fruits with less than 7% ABV, which was aimed at protecting wine producers. Present laws and regulations are favourable to cider makers, but production has only survived in a few alpine locations, mostly in the regions of Trentino and in Piedmont, where it is known as vin ëd pom (apple wine) or pomada, because it traditionally was left to ferment in a vat along with grape pomace, giving it a distinctive reddish colour.

==== Netherlands ====
In the Netherlands, cider is not as widely available as in neighboring countries. In 2007, Heineken began testing a cider-based drink branded Jillz at a number of bars across the country. The beverage, an alcopop made by blending sparkling water, fruit flavouring, malt, and cider, is marketed towards female drinkers as an alternative to beer. At the same time, Heineken introduced Strongbow Gold as a secondary brand to offer a real cider, targeted at a male audience. Both beverages contain 5% alcohol by volume, which is similar to a typical draught beer in the Netherlands. Other brands are available in supermarkets, most noticeably Magners and Savanna Cider, and in liquor stores, generally, a broader range may be obtained.

==== Norway ====
In Norway, cider (sider) is a naturally fermented apple juice. Pear juice is sometimes mixed with the apple to help initiate fermentation.

Apples have been grown along the fjords of western Norway since the 13th century, and cider production has a long history along Hardangerfjorden and Sognefjorden. Production thrived between 1890 and 1920, but political regulations and the introduction of Vinmonopolet in 1921 reduced commercial production.

Today, more than a hundred domestic, and dozens of imported varieties are available through the state alcohol monopoly Vinmonopolet. Although they can hardly be marketed, in line with the law of 1975 prohibiting all advertising of alcoholic beverages of ABV above 2.5%, therefore the products receive little exposure despite a few favourable press reviews. In 2016 a new law opened for sale of beverages with ABV up to 22% directly from the producers, and by 2022, 130 different brands of Norwegian cider were commercially available.

Ciders of low alcohol levels are widely available, mostly brands imported from Sweden; carbonated soft drinks with no alcoholic content may also be marketed as "cider".

==== Portugal ====
Cider was once very popular in northern Portugal where its production was larger than wine production until the 11th century, but nowadays, its popularity has decreased and it is mostly consumed in the coasts of Minho, Âncora e Lima, where it is used as a refreshment for thirst. In some festivities, it is still used rather than wine. There is also a traditional production of the drink in Madeira.

==== Poland ====
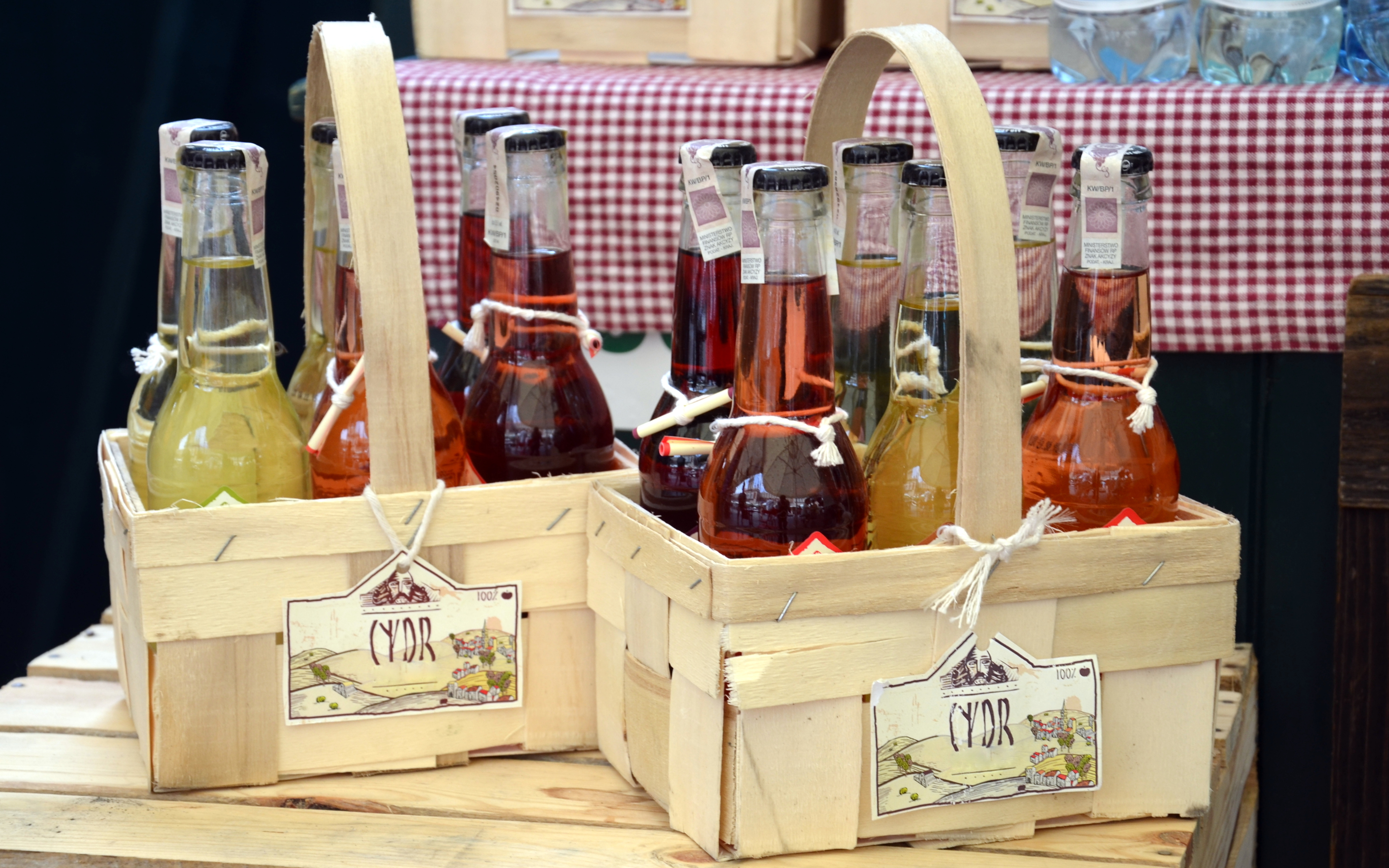
Polish cider sold in Krakow

Poland is the largest producer of apples in Europe. Cider is known in Poland as Cydr or Jabłecznik. In 2013, Poles drank 2 million litres of cider, accounting for 1% of the country's annual alcohol sales. Sales more than doubled from the previous year. In the summer of 2014, Minister of Economy Janusz Piechociński supported in vain the creation of a draft law to legalise television cider publicity.

The category is just gaining popularity among consumers. Areas strong in cider production are focused around the centre of the country in the Masovian and Łódź voivodeships. Large quantities of Polish apple concentrate are exported to the European Union for cider production.

==== Spain ====
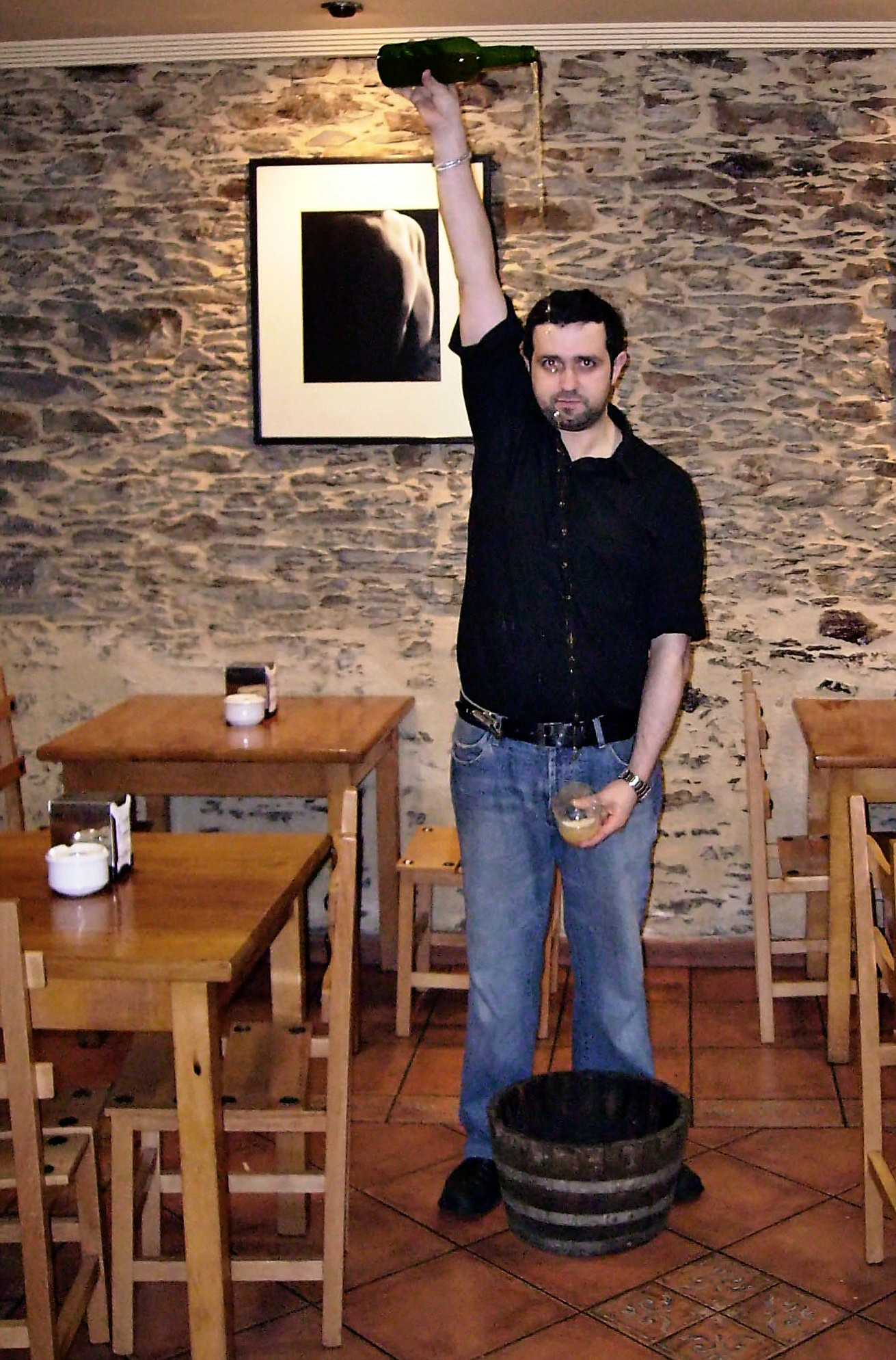
Asturian cider being poured ("escanciado") in the traditional manner

The making and drinking of cider is traditional in several areas of northern Spain, mainly Galicia, the Principality of Asturias, Cantabria, and the Basque Country.

The largest producer of cider in Spain is the Atlantic region of Asturias, where cider is considered not only a beverage but an intrinsic part of its culture and folklore. Asturias accounts for more than 80% of Spain's total production. Cider consumption in Asturias is 54 litres per person/year, probably the highest of any European region.

The first testimony about cider in Asturias was made by Greek geographer Strabo in 60 BC.

The traditional Asturian sidra is a still cider with 4–8% alcohol by volume, though other varieties exist. Traditionally, it is served in sidrerías and chigres, pubs specialising in cider, where it is also possible to have other drinks and traditional food. One of the most outstanding characteristics is that it is poured in very small quantities from a height into a wide glass, with the arm holding the bottle extended upwards and the one holding the glass extended downward. This technique is called escanciar un culín (also echar un culín) and is done to introduce air bubbles into the drink (espalmar), giving it a sparkling taste like Champagne that lasts only a very short time.

Cider is also poured from barrels in the traditional Espichas.

One of the most popular ciders in Spain is "El Gaitero" (the bagpipe player), produced in this region and found throughout the country. However, it must not be confused with traditional Asturian cider, as it is a sparkling cider more akin to French ciders. It is a factory-produced cider, sweet and very foamy, much like lambrusco, unlike more artisanal, traditional cider production. Recently, new apple tree plantations have been established on the grounds of the old coal mines, once important in Asturias.

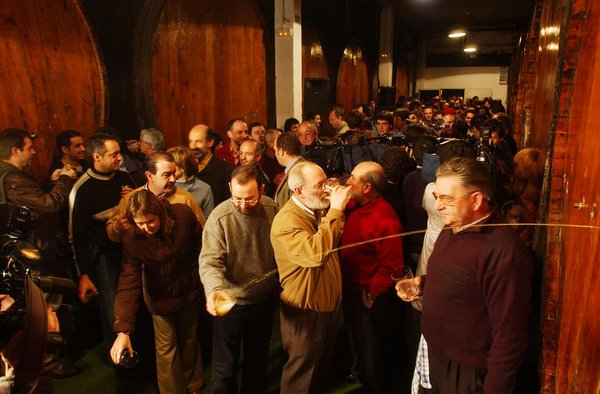
Basque people drinking cider in a sagardotegi (cider house)

Cider has also been popular in the Basque Country for centuries. While Txakoli and Rioja wines became more popular in Biscay, Álava, and Navarre during the 19th century, there is still a strong Basque cider culture in Gipuzkoa. From the 1980s, government and gastronomic associations have worked to revive this culture in all Basque regions. Known as sagardoa (IPA: /s̺a'gardoa/), it is drunk either bottled or in a cider house (called a sagardotegi), where it is poured from barrels. Most "sagardotegis" are in northern Gipuzkoa (Astigarraga, Hernani, Urnieta, and Usurbil), but they can be found throughout Gipuzkoa, the northwest of Navarre, and the French Basque Country.

Cider tasting events are popular in the Basque province of Gipuzkoa, where stalls are set up on the street, selling cider from several producers at low prices, and the cider is served until stock runs out.

==== Sweden ====
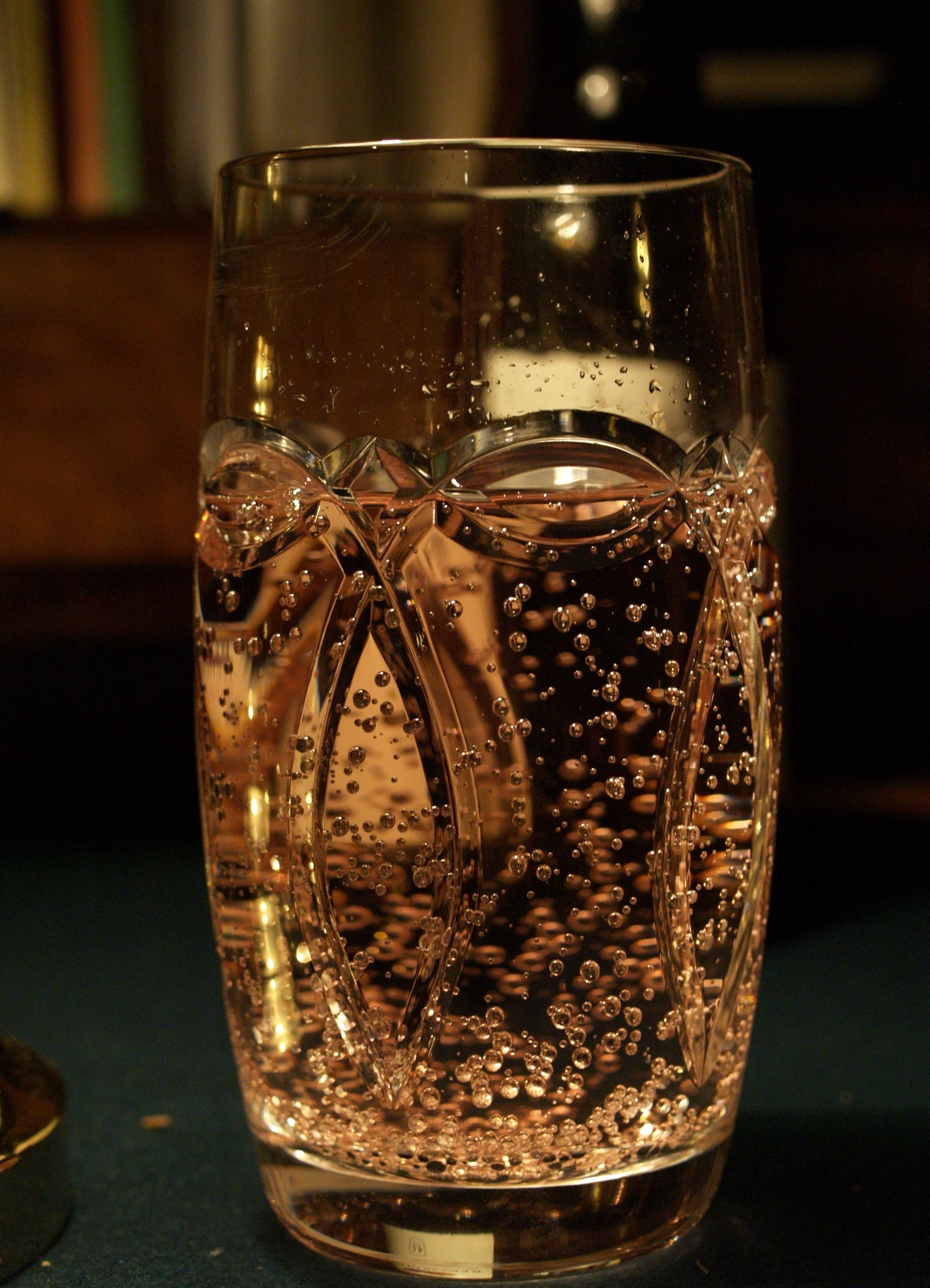
A glass of Rekorderlig wild-berries cider (Sweden)

Due to Swedish law, stores in Sweden cannot sell cider with less than 15 percentage juice by volume under the name Cider. "Cider" with none or less than 15% juice is instead usually sold as "Apple/Pear beverage of cider character" (Swedish: "Äpple-/Pärondryck med Ciderkaraktär"). Brands of cider in Sweden include Rekorderlig, Kivik, Herrljunga and Kopparberg. As of 2024, there are around 30 producers of cider in Sweden.

Cider has a long history in Sweden, dating back to medieval times. Due to the strong influence of the Swedish temperance movement, nearly all beverages sold as cider during the 20th century were sweetened, flavoured, non-alcoholic beverages similar to soft drinks. It was not until the 1990s that Systembolaget began to sell alcoholic cider.

The notably sweet "Swedish cider," with flavours of apple and pear or elderberry and wild berries, is consumed in many countries, including the United Kingdom, as an alternative to traditional British cider.

==== Switzerland ====
In Switzerland, cider is called Suure Most or Saft in the German-speaking part, Cidre in the Romandy, and sidro in the Italian-speaking regions. The drink became popular in the 19th century, when apple production increased due to advances in pomology. At the turn of the century, cider consumption was at 28.1 litres per person. In the 1920s, advances in the pasteurisation of apple juice and the emerging temperance movement led to a sharp decline in cider production.

Today, typical Swiss cider consists of fermented apple juice mixed with 30% fresh juice, which is added for sweetness. This drink is then pasteurised and force-carbonated. Imported cider is uncommon because, under Swiss law, cider must contain more than 70% juice.

==== United Kingdom ====
There are two broad main traditions in cider production in the UK: the West Country tradition and the eastern Kent and East Anglia tradition. The former are made using a much higher percentage of true cider apples and are therefore richer in tannins and sharper in flavour. Kent and East Anglia ciders tend to use a higher percentage of, or be made exclusively from, culinary and dessert fruit; they are typically clearer, more vinous, and lighter in body and flavour.

At one end of the scale are the traditional, small farm-produced varieties. These are non-carbonated and usually cloudy orange in appearance. Britain's West Country contains many of these farms, which have an abundance of ancient varieties of specialist cider apples. Production is often on such a small scale, the product being sold only at the site of manufacture or in local pubs and shops. At the other end of the scale are the factories mass-producing brands such as Strongbow and Blackthorn.

Mass-produced cider, such as that produced by Bulmers, is likely to be pasteurised and force-carbonated. The colour is likely to be golden yellow, with a clear appearance due to filtration. White ciders are almost colourless in appearance and must contain only 25% apple.

=== Americas ===
In the US, "cider" often refers to sweetened, unfiltered apple juice, traditionally made with a distinct sweet-tart taste, and in these regions, the fermented (alcoholic) beverage is known as "hard cider". In Canada, "cider" usually refers to the alcoholic drink, while the non-alcoholic juice may sometimes be called "apple cider".

==== Argentina ====
In Argentina, cider, or sidra, is by far the most popular alcoholic carbonated drink during the Christmas and New Year holidays. It has traditionally been considered the choice of the middle and lower classes (along with ananá fizz and pineapple juice), whereas the higher classes would rather go for champagne or local sparkling wines for their Christmas or New Year toast. Popular commercial brands of cider include Real, La Victoria, "Rama Caida", and Tunuyan. It was traditionally marketed in 0.72-litre glass bottles, similar to Champagne bottles, and in PET bottles for lower-end brands.

However, cider has grown strongly and is becoming a year-round beverage. Most brands now offer half-litre cans, and new flavours such as berries, peer, and some flavoured with plants such as elderberry and cardamom.

==== Brazil ====
Just like in Argentina, cider, or sidra, is a very popular alcoholic beverage during the festive seasons of Christmas and New Year's in Brazil. Just like in that country, it has also been the traditional choice of the middle and lower classes for traditional sparkling for said season. Cereser, one of the most traditional cider brands in Brazil, claims on its website that "in tune with the Brazilian market", it has diversified its product range over the years from the traditional apple flavour, to other more uncommon ones elsewhere in the world, with fruity flavours ranging from peach to grapes, and including even alcohol-free ciders in its product range.

==== Canada ====
Cider is produced commercially in every Canadian province except Newfoundland and Labrador, usually with a 5–7% alcohol content, although the term is also used for some non-fermented apple juices. According to the Canadian Food and Drug Regulations, alcoholic cider is an alcoholic fermentation of apple juice that does not contain more than 13% absolute alcohol by volume (ABV) or less than 2.5% ABV.

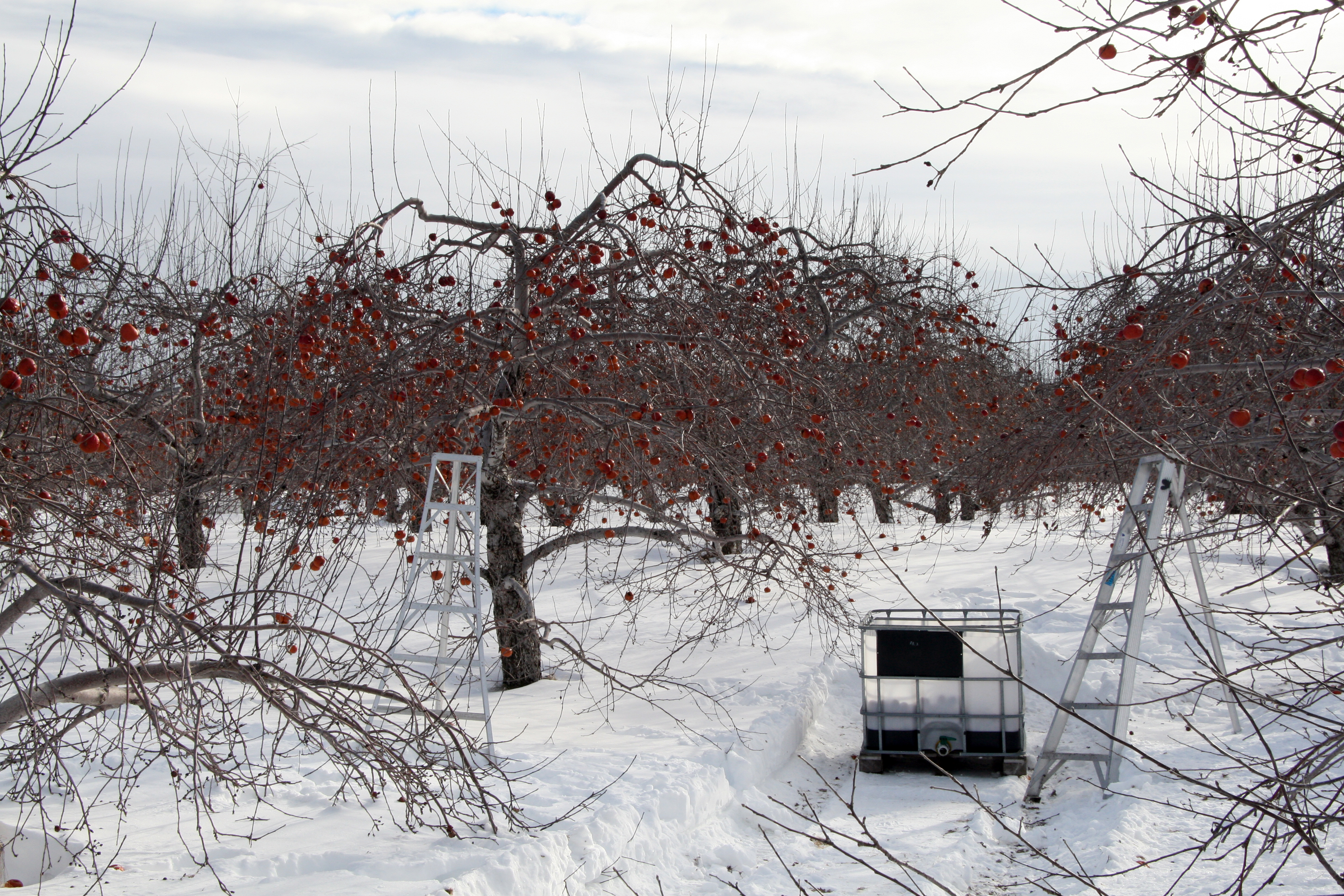
Frozen apples in Quebec for the making of ice cider

Quebec cider is considered a traditional alcoholic beverage. It is generally sold in 750 ml bottles, has an alcohol content typically between 7% and 13% (with aperitif ciders reaching up to 20%), and can be served as a substitute for wine. As in the rest of the world, sparkling cider is getting more and more popular in Quebec, and thanks to the law, cider sold in the province can only be made from 100% pure apple juice. Cider making was, however, forbidden from the early years of British rule as it was in direct conflict with established British brewers' interests (most notably John Molson). In recent years, a new type called ice cider has been sold. This type of cider is made from apples with a particularly high sugar content due to natural frost.

The regulations regarding cider in Canada are fairly strict regarding sourcing and alcohol content. For it to be legally sold as cider, it must be the product of the alcoholic fermentation of apple juice and it must contain no less than 2.5 and no more than 13.0 percent alcohol by volume. However, the list of ingredients that may be added during manufacture is quite flexible, allowing for 17 categories of foods, chemicals, and gases.

==== Chile ====
Cider has been made in Chile since colonial times. Southern Chile accounts for nearly all cider production in the country. Chileans make a distinction between "sidra" ("cider"), in fact, sparkling cider, and "chicha de manzana" ("apple chicha"), a homemade cider considered lower quality.

==== Mexico ====
Two types of cider (sidra) are sold in Mexico. One type is a popular apple-flavoured, carbonated soft drink, sold under a number of soft drink brands, such as Sidral Mundet and Manzana Lift (both Coca-Cola FEMSA brands), Manzanita Sol (owned by PepsiCo), and Sidral Aga from Group AGA. The other type, alcoholic sidra, is a sparkling cider typically sold in Champagne-style bottles with an alcohol content comparable to that of beer. Due to the expense of imported champagne, sidra was sometimes used as a substitute for New Year's Eve toasts in Mexico, as it is also a sweet, fruity drink. However, the practice is now to drink cider on Christmas Eve, celebrated with family, and champagne on New Year's, celebrated with friends. Cider beverages account for a very small share of the Mexican alcoholic beverage market, with 2009 volume sales totaling only 3.8 million litres.

==== United States ====
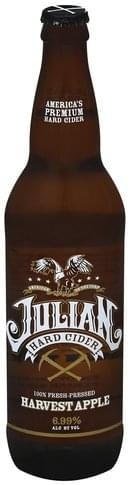
American craft hard cider in a bottle

In the United States, the definition of "cider" is usually broader than in Europe, specifically Ireland and the UK. There are two types, one as traditional alcoholic hard cider and the other sweet or soft cider, often simply called apple cider. In the 2010s, hard cider experienced a resurgence in consumption in the United States.

==== Uruguay ====
Cider fizz or fizz is a cider variety made by mixing and fermenting various fruit juices other than apple with cider, such as ananá fizz (pineapple juice), frutilla fizz (strawberry juice), or durazno fizz (peach juice).

=== East Asia ===
Usually, "cider" in East Asia refers to a soft drink similar to Sprite or lemonade.

==== China ====
A popular drink in China is called "Apple cider vinegar" (Chinese: 苹果醋; pinyin: Píngguǒ Cù). Shanxi is noted for the "vinegar" produced there.

==== Japan ====
In Japan, the terms "cidre" (シードル, shīdoru) or "apple sparkling wine" usually refer to the alcoholic beverage to distinguish it from the nonalcoholic sparkling soda, cider, although both terms are now used interchangeably. While Japan is not historically a cider-making country, there is currently a renaissance of new, younger cider makers in the prefectures of Aomori and Nagano, such as Aomori's A-Factory.

In 2019, the number of international ciders imported into Japan increased, signaling the start of their popularity among Japanese consumers.

=== South Asia ===
==== India ====
Recent economic growth has led to the development of new categories of alcohol in India. Cider is one such category. New product launches are seen in almost all metropolitan cities. Also, a filtered, non-alcoholic, carbonated apple juice called "Appy Fizz" was introduced by Parle in India in 2005 and became an instant hit. Recently, they have decided to push the brand beyond the ₹10 billion mark ($97.5 million).

==== Pakistan ====
Non-alcoholic, apple-flavoured carbonated drinks are popular in the country, with local brands such as Mehran Bottler's Apple Sidra and Murree Brewery's Big Apple in the market.

=== Africa ===
==== Kenya ====
East African Breweries launched Tusker Premium Cider in 2017.

==== South Africa ====
There are two major cider brands produced in South Africa: Hunters and Savanna. They are produced and distributed through Heineken, which acquired Distell in April 2023. Hunters Gold was first introduced in South Africa in 1988 as an alternative to beer. The Hunters range includes Hunters Dry, Hunters Gold, Hunters Export, and Hunters Edge, launched in April 2017. Savanna Dry was introduced in 1996 and also comes in Light, Angry Lemon, and Alc Free variants, excluding limited-run variants such as Loco, Blackbeard, and Neat.

The Elgin Valley, east of Cape Town, grows around 60% of all apples in South Africa. As a result, the region also has a vibrant craft cider scene, with brands like Sxollie, Everson's, Cluver & Jack, Windermere and Terra Madre all produced in the area.

Sxollie Cider is increasingly being exported worldwide, especially to the UK. Almost 90% of all the Sxollie produced is exported. Sxollie is pronounced like "skollie". Sxollie's Pink Lady Cider won Supreme Champion at the International Cider Challenge in 2019.

Windermere Cider began brewing in 1994 and is regarded as the oldest craft cider brewery in South Africa.

Loxtonia Cider, produced in the Ceres area, was crowned the overall champion at the 11th International Cider Challenge in London in 2021. Loxtonia's Alexandra Blush Méthode Traditionnelle was named Supreme Champion in 2021 and won the Rosé Trophy as the best cider in the rosé category.

=== Oceania ===
==== Australia ====
The Australia New Zealand Food Standards Code defines cider as "fruit wine prepared from the juice or must of apples and no more than 25% of the juice or must of pears".

Cider has been made in Australia since its early settlement. Primarily, this production has been for limited local usage, with national commercial distribution and sales dominated by brewery-owned brands such as Mercury Cider, Strongbow and imported ciders such as Somersby and Rekordelig

With growing interest in cider, the number of local producers has increased. Some cider producers are attempting to use more traditional methods and traditional cider apple varieties such as Henry of Harcourt and Crucible in S.W. Victoria. In Western Australia, the number of cider producers has also grown in the southwest region, particularly in areas where wine is also produced.

==== New Zealand ====
In New Zealand, cider is categorised as a fruit wine and the rules which define what can be called a cider are very lax; the standards do not even specify a minimum for the amount of apple juice required to call a drink "cider". At the same time Ready to Drink beverages are not permitted for sale in supermarkets and grocery outlets. These two factors have led to the production of a wide range of low-juice-content, sweet, often flavoured drinks marketed under the "cider" banner to circumvent this restriction. Most of these ciders are produced and marketed by the three large brewers (Lion Nathan, DB and Independent).

Most New Zealand ciders are made from concentrate or from rejected apples from the country's significant apple export industry. These ciders are made year-round with little consideration given to maturation.

A few producers have demonstrated that NZ apples can be used to make cider. Peckham's Cider is the principal producer in this class. They make whole juice ciders from apples grown specifically for cidermaking, principally from their own orchard of 30 heritage cider varieties. They have won Champion Cider in the NZ Cider Awards in 2015, 2016 and 2017.

== See also ==
- Cider apple
- Applejack
- Calvados
- List of cider brands
- List of cideries in the United States
