= Namibia Breweries Limited =

Namibian brewery

- Interactive map of Namibia Breweries Limited
- Location: Windhoek, Namibia
- Coordinates: 22°31′25.24″S 17°4′44.20″E
- Opened: 1920; 106 years ago
- Owned by: Heineken Beverages (2023–present)
- Website: nambrew.com

Active beers
Name	Type
Windhoek Lager	Lager
Windhoek Light	Light beer
Hansa Pilsener	Pilsener
Tafel Lager	Lager

Namibia Breweries Limited (NBL) is a brewery founded in 1920 and based in Windhoek, Namibia. On April 26, 2023, Heineken announced that it had completed the purchase of Namibian Breweries.

Upon completion of the acquisition, its operations were integrated into Heineken Beverages, a company created by the multinational from the merger of its South African unit, NBL and another African brewery acquired by the Dutch company, Distell.

== History ==
The brewery was founded in 1920 when Carl List and Hermann Ohlthaver acquired four small breweries with financial difficulties. The breweries were merged under the name South West Breweries Limited (SWB).

In March 1990, SWB changed its name to Namibia Breweries Limited when Namibia gained its independence from apartheid South Africa. Ohlthaver & List Group of Companies are still the majority shareholder. B Since 2003, Namibia Breweries Limited has been working in partnership with Heineken South Africa. After 2010, NBL started to buy shares of Heineken SA, eventually reaching a 25% ownership of the Dutch subsidiary in South Africa.

In 2014, Namibian Breweries Limited became the first brewer in Africa to switch to solar energy, and on a large scale. It invested in a 1.MW Solar Power plant installed on existing roof structures and covering up to 34% of its energy use.

In November 2021, Heineken announced the purchase of two African breweries (NBL and Distell) for US$4.6 billion – with Namibia's valued at €400 million. The acquisition was completed in 2023.

== Description ==
NBL brew all of their beers according to the Reinheitsgebot (German purity law) from 1516. Other than the four top-selling beers NBL also produces some speciality beers like Urbock - a winter bock beer. Nambrew also distributes other beer brands like Erdinger Weissbeer, Guinness and Kilkenny in the region. The low alcohol (2%), low calorie product Windhoek Light was endorsed by the South African Heart Foundation.

Currently NBL exports 20.5% of its production to South Africa and 22 other countries world-wide.

== Products ==
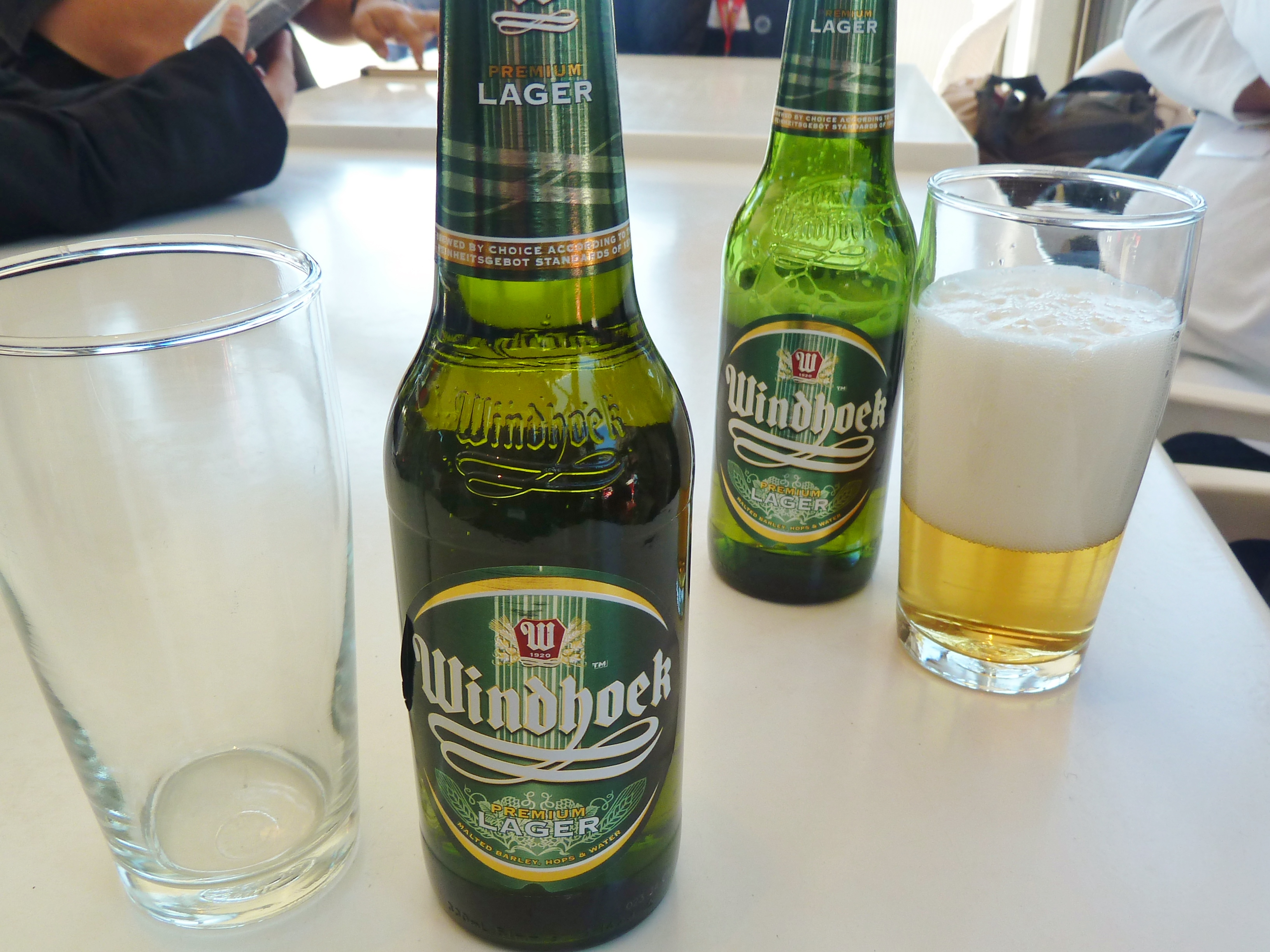
Bottles of Windhoek Lager

Own products:

- Club Shandy
- Tafel Lager
- Tafel Lite
- Tafel Radler
- Camelthorn
- King Lager
- Hansa Draught
- Windhoek Draught
- Windhoek Lager
- Windhoek Light
- Windhoek Non-alcoholic
- McKane: Soda Water, Tonic Water, Lemonade, Dry Lemon and Cranberry
- Vigo (malt soft drink): Marula, Wild Orange and Kiwano
- AquaSplash

Brewed under licence:

- Amstel Lager
- Amstel Lite
- Heineken
- Horizon
- Strongbow

Distribute:

- Guinness
- Erdinger
- Erdinger Non-alcoholic
- Foundry Cider
- Archers Aqua (various flavours)

== Bibliography ==
- Tycho van der Hoog (2019). Breweries, Politics and Identity: The History Behind Namibia's Beer. Basler Afrika Bibliographien.
