= Herrljunga Cider =

Herrljunga Cider is a low-alcohol cider produced by Herrljunga Brewery in Sweden. The brewery claims that Herrljunga is Sweden's best selling cider, based on sales figures collected by AC Nielson and Systembolaget.

Herrljunga Brewery was founded in 1911. The company is under the fourth generation of family ownership and currently produces cider not just under its own brands but for other companies too. They are also one of Sweden's largest producers of mulled wine (glögg).
