= Wickson =

Wickson is a surname. Notable people with the surname include:

- Edward J. Wickson (1848–1923), American agronomist and journalist
- Frank Wickson (1861–1936), Canadian architect
- Ian Wickson (1955–2012), Australian rules footballer
- Roger Wickson (disambiguation), multiple people
