= Somersby (cider) =

Brand of cider

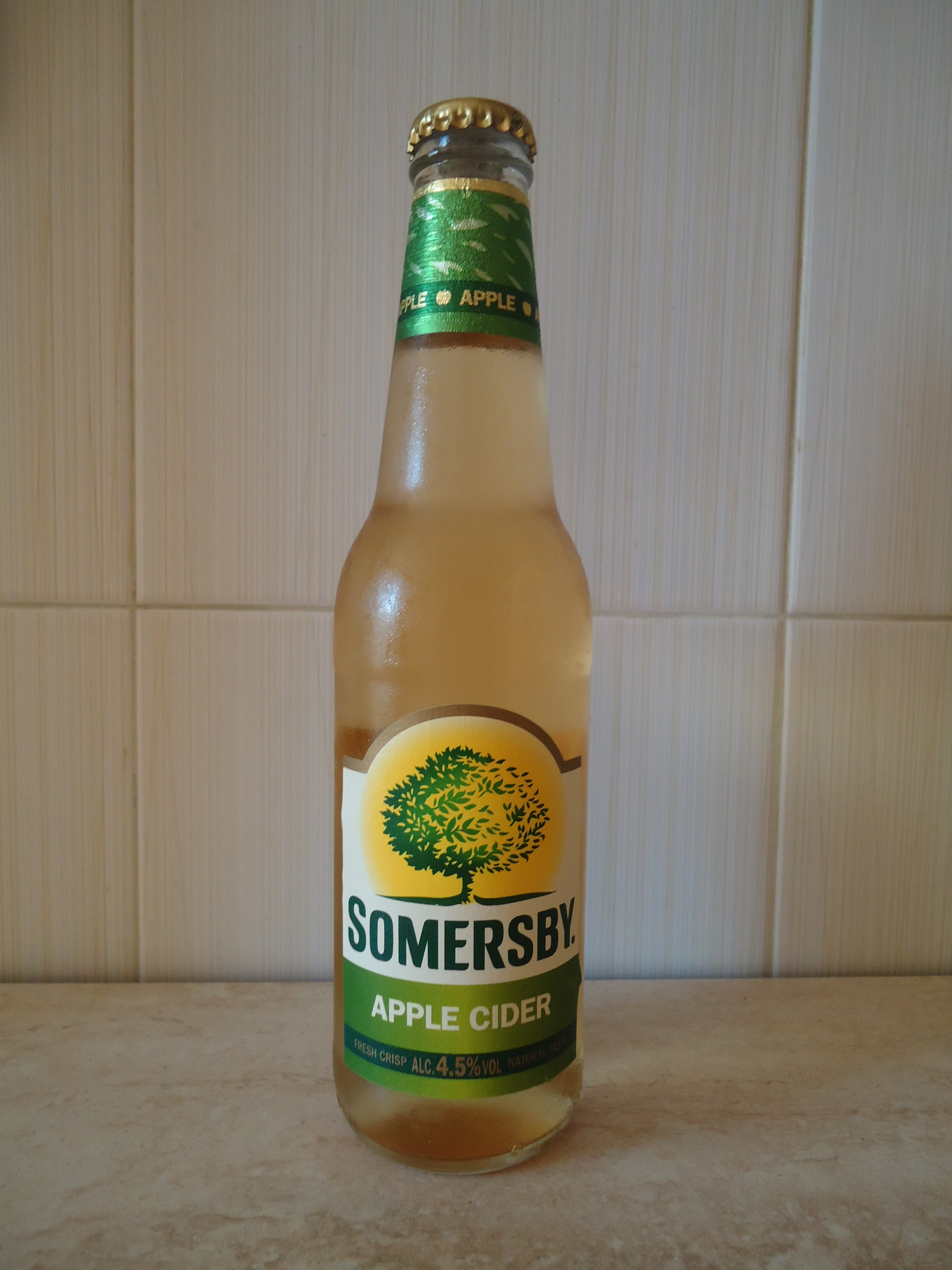
- Type: Cider
- Manufacturer: Carlsberg Group
- Origin: Denmark
- Introduced: 2008
- Alcohol by volume: 4.5%
- Variants: Apple; Pear; Blackberry; Blueberry; Elderflower & Lime; Mango & Lime; Watermelon; Red Rhubarb; Mandarin; Orange Spritz (Germany); Passionfruit & Orange (Hungary); Cherry & Apple (Poland); Dragonfruit & Raspberry (Poland); Pomelo & Granade (Poland); Sparkling Rosé; Sparkling White; Sparkling Spritz
- Website: somersby.com

Somersby (Pronunciation: səməzbjʊ; marketed as Somersby Cider in English speaking countries) is a brand of cider by Danish brewing company Carlsberg Group. Launched in Denmark in 2008, it is now available in more than 40 countries, including all of Europe, Nepal, Australia, New Zealand, Malaysia, Hong Kong, Taiwan, Thailand, South Korea, Canada, Sri Lanka, South Africa, the United States and Laos.

Despite its Danish origin, the cider is marketed in many territories as being the creation of "Lord Somersby", a fictional English Lord.

== Varieties ==
Apart from pure apple cider, the Somersby brand is also used for pear cider, various flavoured apple ciders, a calorie-reduced apple cider, and in Poland, various fruit-flavoured beers.

Apple cider flavours include blackberry, rhubarb, elderflower, ginger and lemon, blueberry, apple burst, cranberry, citrus, watermelon.

In Poland, the brand Somersby is used by Carlsberg for fruit-flavoured beer instead of cider. This is due to the relative unpopularity of cider as a type of drink among Polish customers, as well as legal restrictions on the sale and marketing of cider in the country, which include a ban on advertisement.

In Poland, Switzerland, France and Quebec, Carlsberg uses the Somersby brand for a beverage that is a mixture of beer (45%) and apple flavoured drink (55%). Since this product cannot be classified as a cider, it is sold as Apple Beer Drink.

In 2012, Carlsberg UK developed and introduced a new version of Somersby Cider specific to the United Kingdom market. Somersby Cider UK is a 4.5% ABV medium dry cider with no artificial flavours or sweeteners.

== See also ==
- List of cider brands
