= Savanna Cider =

South African brand of cider

Savanna Premium Cider
- Savanna Premium Cider logo
- Type: Cider
- Manufacturer: Heineken Beverages (Heineken)
- Origin: South Africa
- Introduced: 1996 (by Distell)
- Alcohol by volume: 6% – Dry; 3% – Light; 5% – Lemon; <0.3% – Alc Free; 5.5% - Neat
- Colour: Gold
- Flavour: Dry apple cider
- Variants: Dry, Light, Angry Lemon, Alc Free, Neat
- Website: www.savanna.co.za

Savanna Cider is a range of South African cider introduced by the Distell Group Limited in May 1996. Savanna Dry is sold in over 60 countries, and it is South Africa’s leading cider export and the largest cider brand in the world by volume. Savanna Cider is produced from crushed apples grown in the Elgin Valley of the Western Cape and additional imports as required. The majority of the production of the cider takes place in the KHS plant in Springs, South Africa. The overall production process is typically two weeks in length and during this period; the product is run through a micro-filtration process where it is triple filtered and double chilled. Savanna Cider is available in four main variants: Savanna Dry, Savanna Light, Savanna Alc Free and Savanna Angry Lemon. Savanna Dry was the first cider produced by Savanna and has used the tagline "It’s Dry, But You Can Drink It" since launch. It contains an alcohol level of 6% ABV. Savanna Light was launched in May 2000 and contains an alcohol level of 3% ABV. Savanna Alc Free was launched in April 2019 and contains less than 0.3% of alcohol by volume.

== See also ==
- Heineken brands
