= Heineken Beverages =

Holding company created by Heineken

Heineken Beverages Holdings Limited
- Formerly: Sunside Acquisitions Limited
- Type: Public limited company
- Traded as: JSE: DGH
- Industry: Brewing, Beverage
- Predecessor: Distell Group
- Founded: 10 October 2020; 5 years ago
- Owner: Heineken
- Subsidiaries: Heineken South Africa; Kenya Wine Agencies Limited; Namibia Breweries Limited; Distell
- Website: www.heinekenbeverages.co.za

Heineken Beverages Holdings Limited, formerly known as Sunside Acquisitions Limited, is a special-purpose vehicle set up by Heineken to house its Southern and Eastern African assets alongside the bulk of the Distell business.

== History ==
On 15 November 2021, Heineken announced a plan to acquire part of Distell Group business, in order to become the market-leading alcoholic beverage supplier in South Africa. Through the deal, Heineken and Remgro aimed to spin off a bulk of Distell's business to Sunside Acquisitions Ltd. As part of the transaction, Heineken agreed to merge its investments in Heineken South Africa, Namibia Breweries and operations in Kenya, Uganda, Tanzania, Zambia, Botswana, Zimbabwe and South Sudan into the new entity.

== Brands ==
Heineken Beverages brands include:

=== Spirit portfolio ===
- Klipdrift Export
- Richelieu
- Viceroy
- Mellow-Wood
- Oude Meester VSOB
- Commando
- Richelieu XO
- Underberg
- Amarula
- Nachtmusik
- Oude Meester Peppermint & Ginger Liqueurs
- Flight of the Fish Eagle
- Klipdrift Premium
- Van Ryn’s 10, 12, 15 and 20 year old collection
- Oude Meester Reserve
- Klipdrift Gold
- Nederburg Potstill Solera Brandy
- Richelieu 10
- Bain's Cape Mountain Whisky
- Harrier
- Knights
- Three Ships
- Seven Seas

=== Wine portfolio ===
- Nederburg
- 4th Street
- 5th Avenue
- Cellar Cask
- Chateau Libertas
- Drostdy-Hof
- Graça
- Grand Mousseux
- Grunberger
- JC Le Roux
- Peche Royale
- Two Oceans
- Clubman
- Copperband
- Delgado Supremo
- Mokador
- Vincoco
- Zorba
- Autumn Harvest Crackling
- Capenheimer
- Kellerprinz
- Oom Tas
- Overmeer
- Paarle Perle
- Ship Sherry
- Sedgwicks Old Brown
- Tassenberg
- Taverna Rouge
- Witzenberg Stein
- Durbanville Hills
- Flat Roof Manor
- Fleur du Cap
- Lomond
- Monis
- Place in the Sun
- Pongracz
- Zonnebloem

=== Cider and ready to drink ===
- Ciders
- Hunters Dry
- Hunter Gold
- Savanna Cider
- Bernini
- Esprit
- Hunters Extreme
- Klipdrift & Cola
- Hunters Edge
- 4th Street

== Ownership ==
As of 31 December 2024, shareholding in the Heineken Beverages Holdings's stock was as depicted in the table below:

Heineken Beverages Holdings Limited stock ownership
Rank	Name of owner	Percentage ownership
1.	Heineken N.V. of the Netherlands	65.00
2.	Others	35.00
	Total	100.00

== See also ==
- Kenya Wine Agencies Limited
- Namibia Breweries Limited
- Remgro
