= Manzanita Sol =

Mexican soft drink owned by PepsiCo

- Product type: Soda
- Current owner: Zeferina Vianey Estrada PepsiCo
- Country: Mexico

Manzanita Sol is a brand of apple-flavored soft drinks owned by PepsiCo. It was created by two brothers, Ramon and Manuel Rodriguez Fonseca, who started Embotelladora El Sol after learning the trade from the father, a Spanish industrialist who arrived to Mexico in the 20th Century. The formula for Manzana Sol, a cider flavored drink, was registered in 1950, when the original factory was based in Mexico City's neighborhood of San Pedro de los Pinos, and later moved to Acoxpa 69, in Coapa. PepsiCo. bought the formula in the nineties. It originally included 6% of apple juice.

In the United States it is sold in 12-pack cans, 2-liter, and 20-ounce bottles. The drink is known to be available at Walmart, Albertsons, H-E-B, Ralphs, Kmart, Food 4 Less, Jewel-Osco, Dominick's, Target, Vons, Stater Bros., United Supermarkets in the Amarillo and Lubbock, Texas area, and other smaller chains and smaller family run stores. In Latin American countries, Manzanita Sol competes with Coca-Cola's Manzana Lift. Manzanita Sol is PepsiCo's number two brand in Mexico, with apple being Mexico's second most popular soft drink flavor. It is also very popular in border regions such as the Los Angeles and El Paso metro areas.

In January 2014, Taco Bell added Manzanita Sol to their choice of beverages. This beverage product became available at Golden Corral a year later. In 2017, both Taco Bell and Golden Corral removed Manzanita Sol from their choice of beverages.

"Manzanita Sol" is Spanish for "little apple sun".
