= Roger Wickson =

Roger Wickson may refer to:

- Roger Wickson (figure skater), Canadian figure skater
- Roger Wickson (headmaster) (born 1940), headmaster of the King's School, Chester
