= Jillz =

Alcoholic drink

Jillz, (formerly known as Charli) is a mix of cider, barley and water with a fruity flavor. The drink is called a “Sparkling Cider Blend” and contains 5 percent alcohol. Jillz is brewed by Heineken, a Dutch brewing company, and is available both bottled in supermarkets and on tap in bars. After research showed that in Britain “Charli” is slang for cocaine, this name was changed.

With this drink, Heineken targets consumers who go out regularly but cannot identify with the current variety of alcoholic beverages. Research performed by Heineken indicates that 63% of women find the taste of Beer too bitter. In contrast to beer, Jillz does not contain hops. Hops are used as the bittering agent of beer.

In August 2021, it was announced Jillz will be phased out of the catering industry and supermarkets.
