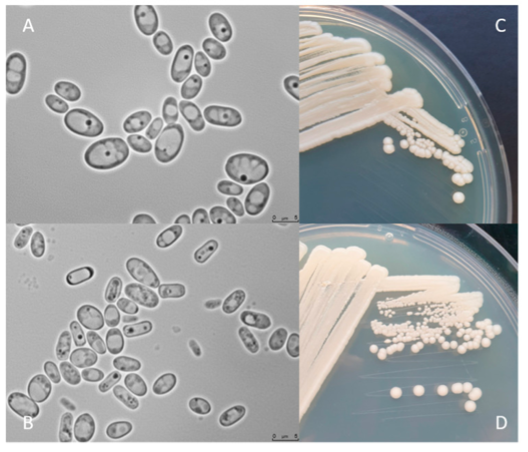
- A species of Cyberlindnera, C. jadinii (torula), after 3 (A) and 12 (B) days of growth on yeast extract-peptone-dextrose media as well as 3 days of growth on a YPD plate (C) and malt extract agar (D).

Scientific classification
- Kingdom: Fungi
- Division: Ascomycota
- Subdivision: Saccharomycotina
- Class: Saccharomycetes
- Order: Phaffomycetales
- Family: Phaffomycetaceae
- Genus: Cyberlindnera

= Cyberlindnera =

Genus of yeasts

Cyberlindnera is a genus of yeasts in the Phaffomycetaceae family. Its name is derived from the Latin word “Ciber,” which originates from “Cibus,” meaning “food” and "sustenance". Early German mycologist Paul Lindner, honored for his contributions to descriptions of Schizosaccharomyces pombe, Saccharomycopsis (Endomyces) fibuligera and other notable species of Saccharomyces and Pichia, is the source of the "-lindnera" portion of the name. The genus has gone through many trials, reevaluations, and verifications to become the organized assortment of species it is today. Species under this genus interact with other organisms in a wide variety of ways and can be found across the globe. They are used by humans for their toxicity, fermentation abilities, and capacity to assimilate many organic compounds.

== Phylogeny ==
The location behind the initial discovery and first description of Cyberlindnera is uncertain. However, it is known that as a genus, its precursor Williopsis was first introduced in 1925 by an undocumented person with the surname "Zender." Williopsis was created to categorize fungi with Saturn-shaped ascospores and restricted nitrate-assimilating function similar to that of the already-known Williopsis saturnus. In modern terms, Williopsis is sometimes used as a common name for the Cyberlindnera genus, despite the fact that it was once something different. Because the center of Williopsis studies was W. saturnus, nitrate was thought to be the sole source of nitrogen for the genus, but this has since been debunked. Williopsis at that time consisted of only five species, listed below, which all exhibited the potential to separate into their own generic status. Based on 18S rRNA gene sequencing, it was found that there was not much shared DNA between these species, and scientists suggested that Williopsis be restricted to the five varieties of W. saturnus alone. This same gene sequencing method is what discovered the genus was phylogenetically heterogeneous.

1. W. californica
2. W. mucosa
3. W. pratensis
4. W. salicornia
5. W. saturnus
  1. var. mrakii
  2. var. sargentensis
  3. var. saturnus (type)
  4. var. suaveolens
  5. var. subsufficiens

After becoming more widely accepted as a genus in 1977 by JA von Arx, phylogenetic analysis increased in frequency. Notably, relationships between accepted species’ large subunit and small subunit rRNAs were examined by Liu and Kurtzman, further proving that most of the accepted species as of 1991 were only loosely tied together genetically.

The way Cyberlindnera spans multiple clades can be explained by scientific misunderstandings and gaps in research. The genera Saccharomyces and Pichia experienced some overlap with Cyberlindnera during multiple reclassifications. Mycologists believed Pichia were related to the outdated Williopsis because they shared two characteristics: the ubiquinone CoQ-7 and an inability to utilize methanol. The fact that Saccharomyces are ascomycete yeasts like Cyberlindnera, spawned confusion between the two in the past. As taxonomic classifications narrowed, species were even split based on anamorph and teleomorph states. Candida is an example of a genus that separated from the previous Williopsis classification based on its anamorphic state. Work is still being carried out to return many more species to consistent genera, so these complex naming schemes may not remain as they are. There is also a disconnect in the understanding of the genetic processes that form species, resulting in genera confusion. For example, Saccharomyces can exhibit amphiploidy, the hybridization of two species, which has previously complicated phylogenetic studies.

Multigene analysis reorganized many of the original Williopsis into the Barnettozyma, Lindnera, Ogotaea and Wickerhamomyces genera in 2008. Lindnera was further improved one year later, transferring the all known Lindnera species to the Cyberlindnera genus as twenty one new combinations. This was due to the need for more accurate taxonomy and the fact that Lindnera was a homonym that already described a plant genus. Nevertheless, new research is always being released, challenging the species count. Technical flaws and incomplete reports still mix up the species under Cyberlindnera. For instance, widely used biochemical assays sometimes identify Cyberlindnera fabianii as Torula or Wickerhamomyces anomalus. This is not surprising, however, as some scientists previously placed Cyberlindnera species within the Phaffomycetaceae family that the Wickerhamomyces belong to. The use of polymerase chain reaction, a technique that reproduces targeted portions of a genome, helps to combat these incorrect findings by allowing scientists to build more accurate representations of these species' unique genomes.

== Description ==
The species that came from Lindnera are either hetero- or homothallic and express a great deal of variety in ascospore morphology and physiological features. Nowadays, the entire Cyberlindnera genus can be observed to express even greater morphological variance. Ascospores are spherical with an equatorial ledge but may take the form of hat or Saturn shapes as well. Asci are also spherical, and the number of ascospores per ascus does not typically exceed four. Teleomorph and anamorph species are both included in the genus, but the majority of the anamorphs have been moved to other titles like Candida. Among Cyberlindnera, there are some species that cause sepsis, produce biofilm, develop resistance to voriconazole and fluconazole, ferment glucose, and/or assimilate a broad range of sugars, polyols, and other carbon sources. In addition to these distinguishing features, asexual holoblastic budding, spheroidal and ellipsoidal blastoconidia, and a lack of pseudohyphae are common, yet not exclusive, traits.

=== Chemistry ===
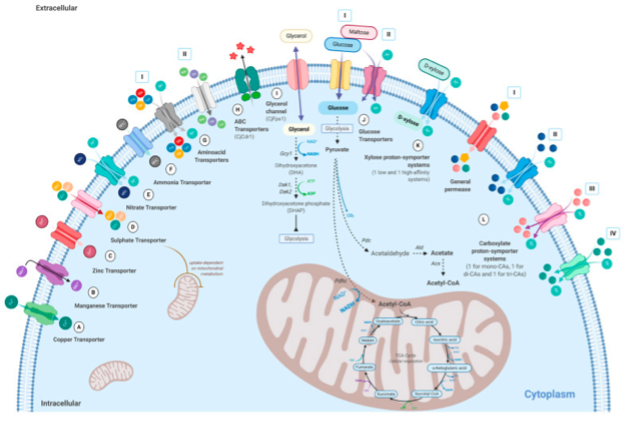
Main metabolic pathways of the general metabolism of yeast.

Living under the Saccharomycetales order, Cyberlindnera mainly consists of saprobes, which derive food by decomposing various materials. These species assimilate sugars and organic acids, typically from plant material, and are copiotrophic due to their ability to assimilate pentoses and tolerate lignocellulosic byproducts. Their nitrogen sources include ammonium salt, nitrate, amino acids, peptides, urea, purines, and pyrimidines while carbon is gathered from hexose sugars as monosaccharides or disaccharides, alcohols, polyols, amino acids, and organic acids. Being yeasts, their metabolic pathways employ Embden-Meyerhof glycolysis, the tricarboxylic acid cycle, the pentose phosphate pathway, and oxidative phosphorylation. Some members of this genus act as endophytes and so can fix dinitrogen, solubilize largely insoluble phosphate, degrade pollutants, and inhibit fungal pathogens. Fermentation is another core aspect of their chemical activity and how they obtain energy, but they only perform alcoholic fermentation and do not produce lactic acid. Some species cannot assimilate potassium nitrate as a sole nitrogen source, but all maintain the potential to nitrify ammonium to nitrate in vitro. Cyberlindnera can also oxidize inorganic reduced forms of other nutrients and elemental sulfur in vitro, producing thiosulfate, tetrathionate, and sulfate.

=== Ecology ===
The geographical distribution of Cyberlindnera is largely unknown, although certain trends can be inferred from collected data. Species under this genus express a high threshold for tolerance of environmental change. Whereas other organisms can only cause fermentation under specific circumstances, Cyberlindnera can begin the process in a large range of conditions. Their robust fermentation characteristics allow growth in wastes from biomass, which is ecologically significant and means that species under the genus can be observed near sites of biomass production. Cyberlindnera have also been isolated from insect frass of coniferous trees and detritus-based mangrove wetlands along the Indian west coast. Barnettozyma pratensis, originally listed under Williopsis, has been obtained from soil in Russia and neighboring regions. Although this species is no longer considered Cyberlindnera, northern soils remain a prospective habitat of the genus due to similarities in fermentation processes. Most recorded species under Cyberlindnera are obtained from laboratory cultures with no listed natural source, and there is a lot of missing information on where to find them in the wild. Based on this limited and highly variable information, there does not appear to be a preference by the genus for a specific part of the globe because the ecological roles and distinguishing characteristics can apply most anywhere.

=== Symbioses ===
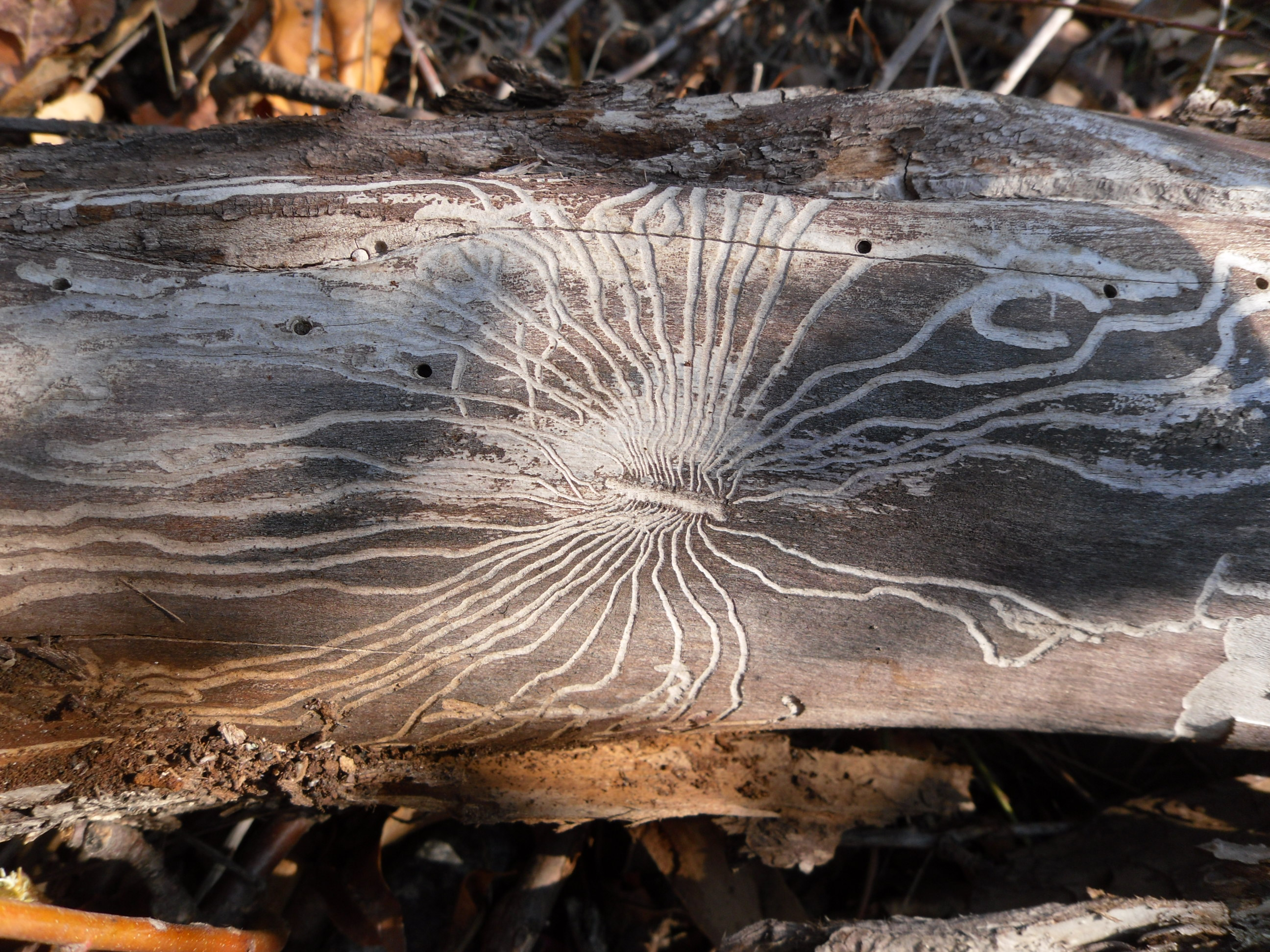
Tracks in a log left by bark beetles and Cyberlindnera americana.

The chemical capabilities of the genus give it the potential to make phosphates more available to plants and contribute to nitrogen and sulphur cycles in soil. A study was performed in which dual inoculated maize with arbuscular mycorrhizal fungi and W. Californica, reporting an increase in shoot biomass but shortening of extraradical mycelium. Species under Cyberlindnera are occasionally symbionts of insects. C. americana in the guts of bark beetles uses enzymes to degrade starch and lipids as well as metabolize xenobiotics independent of the capabilities of their host. These are rare cases of species in the genus acting in an explicitly positive symbioses with other living organisms. While Cyberlindnera are occasional endophytes, these species do not generally partake in positive symbioses with other microorganisms. Many species exhibit toxic activity antagonizing other fungi and bacteria, which caused in four ways. The first is pH change due to growth-coupled ion exchange or organic acid production, which makes media unlivable for most organisms. Competition for nutrients and the production of highly concentrated ethanol byproduct are two more reasons. Finally, the act of secreting or releasing antibacterial and antimicrobial compounds simply harmed other organisms.

== Usage and application ==
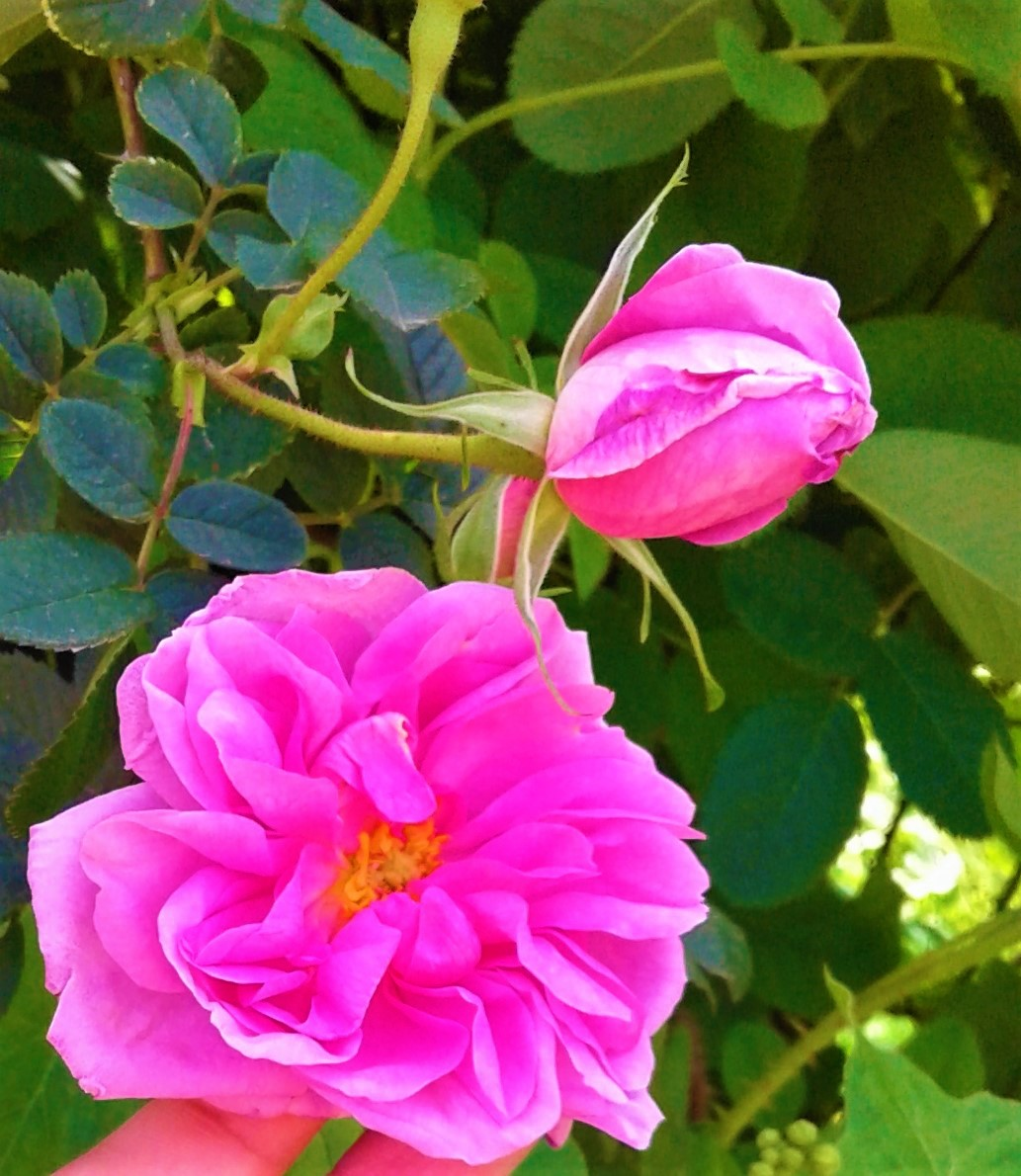
Flower of Rosa damascene in Morocco.

Cyberlindnera species are frequently utilized in laboratories for their chemical structure and abilities. Species within the genus can aid in stereoselective oxidation of secondary alcohols. They also act as sources of single-cell protein that synthesizes compounds for both pharmaceutical and food industries. Cyberlindnera are used to produce food additives, supplements, organic acids, and platform chemical compounds, often as alternatives to nonrenewable petrochemical-based derivatives. Rose oil, used in perfume, can be industrially cultivated from fermentation reactions performed with Cyberlindnera endophytes in Rosa damascene. Cyberlindnera indigenous to the rose flowers increase the growth rate of said flowers and double reduction in the phenolic content. As previously mentioned, these fermentation characteristics also allow growth in wastes from biomass, including hardwood hydrolysates of the pulp industry. This introduces more environmentally friendly techniques to the future of wood and pulp industries worldwide.

=== Consumables ===
Cyberlindnera contributes to the development of sweeteners, food additives, and multiple beverages. The ethyl ester structures of these species act as hubs of flavor for fruits and fermented beverages. Cyberlindnera saturnus retrieved from the Indian west coast can assimilate xylitol, leading to the manufacture of sugarless desserts. Non-alcoholic beer, something that has been witnessing increasing demand, is now being made with non-Saccharomyces yeasts. Using Cyberlindnera in the place of traditional yeasts removes and covers the “wort-like off-flavor” of limited fermentation processes previously used to make these beers. Cyberlindnera species are also the most abundant fungi in the microbial fermentation of Fu brick tea. At least one species of the genus, Torula, can even be grown on wood sugars to be used as natural flavoring and another flavor enhancers.

=== Toxicity ===
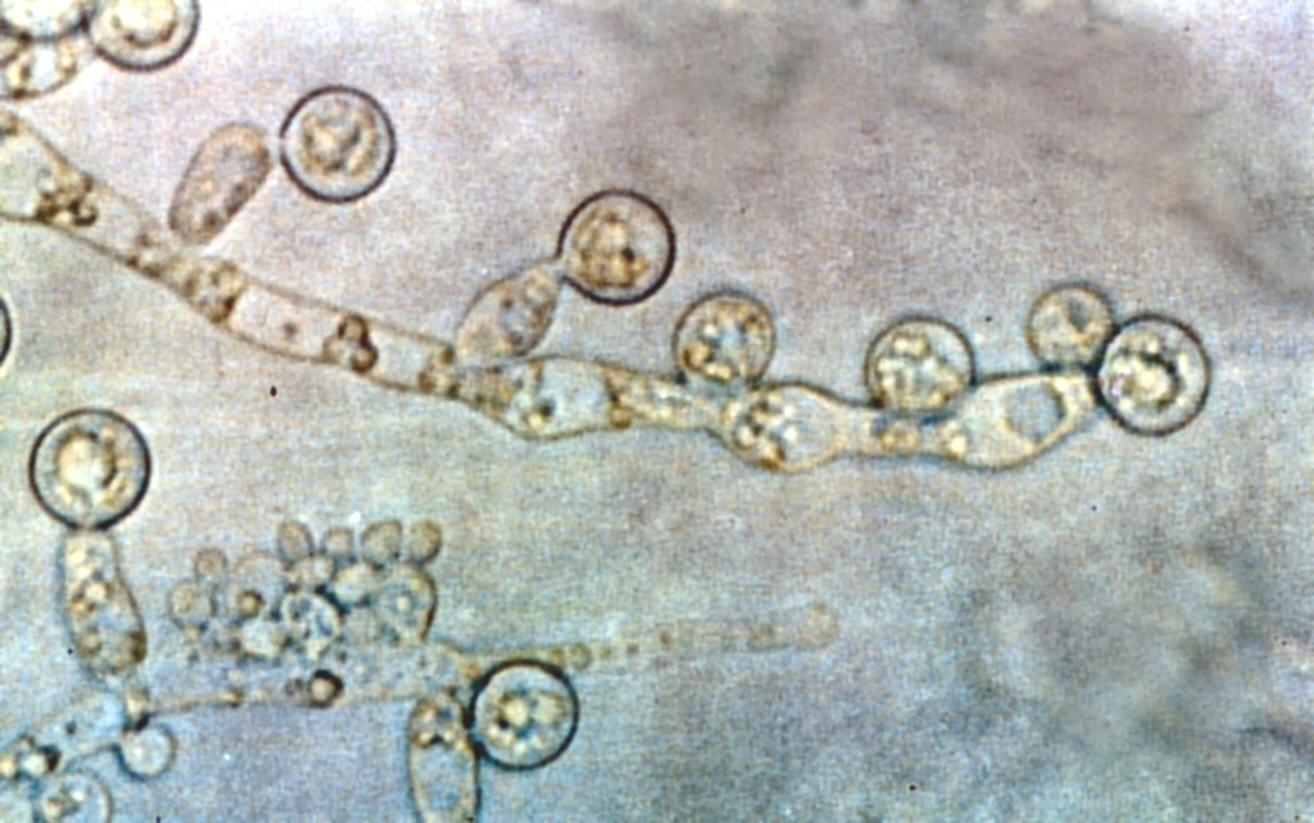
Example of Candida albicans.

The antagonistic nature of Cyberlindnera species towards other microorganisms is taken advantage of to help fight infections and pathogens. Some of the killer toxins produced by members of this genus complicate alcoholic brewing but are useful in treating the candidiasis of Candida albicans. The ascomycete yeasts are immune to many poisons and lethal towards other strains of fungi, with the strength of their toxins growing in proportion to how naturally they were grown. Killer toxin WmKT hinders and has the ability to defeat P. carinii, C. albicans and M. tuberculosis in humans. Biochemical characterization of this toxin is underdeveloped due to having little to no information covering its mode of action, but it has been proposed as a therapy for insidious infectious diseases. β-Glucans reside on the cell surface of most WmKT-sensitive pathogens and in yeast cell walls, which could partially explain why WmKT reduces mycobacterial virulence.
