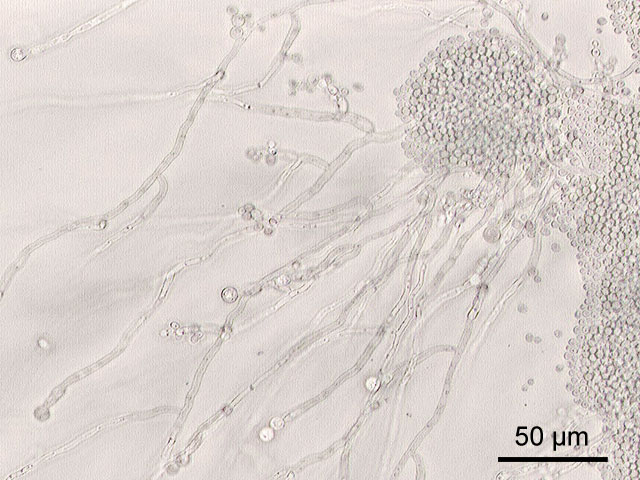
- Candida albicans

Scientific classification
- Kingdom: Fungi
- Division: Ascomycota
- Clade: Saccharomyceta
- Subdivision: Saccharomycotina; O.E. Erikss. & Winka 1997

Classes
- Alloascoideomycetes; Dipodascomycetes; Lipomycetes; Pichiomycetes; Saccharomycetes; Sporopachydermiomycetes; Trigonopsidomycetes

Synonyms
- Hemiascomycotina (Brefeldt 1891) Cavalier-Smith 1998

= Saccharomycotina =

Subdivision of fungi

Saccharomycotina is a subdivision (subphylum) of the division (phylum) Ascomycota in the kingdom Fungi. It comprises most of the ascomycete yeasts. The members of Saccharomycotina reproduce by budding and they do not produce ascocarps (fruiting bodies).

Notable members of Saccharomycotina are the baker's yeast Saccharomyces cerevisiae and the genus Candida that includes several human pathogens.

== Etymology ==
The name comes from the Greek word σάκχαρον (sákkharon), meaning "sugar" and μύκης (mukēs) meaning "fungus".

== History and economic importance ==
Historical records from ancient Egypt and China describe the processes of brewing and baking from 10,000 to 8,000 years ago, and the production of fermented beverages and foods seems to have paralleled the beginning of agriculture. In the 1850s, Louis Pasteur demonstrated that yeasts are responsible for the fermentation of grape juice to wine.

Saccharomycotina include some of the economically most important fungi known. Members include species of industrial and agricultural importance (e.g. brewing, baking, fermentation of food products, production of citric acid, production of recombinant proteins, biofuel production, biological pest control of crops). Other species cause economic losses worldwide (plant pathogens, contaminants of foods and beverages). Yet others are animal and human pathogens.

== Morphology ==
Saccharomycete yeasts usually grow as single cells. Their cellular morphology is fairly simple, although their growth form is highly adapted. Asci are naked and ascospores can have several forms. No species produce ascocarps (fruiting bodies). Saccharomycete genomes are often smaller than those of filamentous fungi.

Some species (e.g. Metschnikowia species) tend to form chains of budding cells that are termed pseudohyphae. Yet other species are able to produce true septate hyphae. Such species (e.g. Candida albicans) are termed dimorphic, which means they can propagate both as budding yeasts and as filamentous hyphae.

== Reproduction ==
=== Asexual reproduction ===
Asexual reproduction occurs mainly vegetatively by mitosis and budding. Saccharomycotina is characterized by holoblastic budding, which means all layers of the parent cell wall are involved in the budding event. This leaves a scar through which no further budding occurs.

Asexual cells may vary in shape. The shape of the cell may be informative in terms of detecting mode of reproduction or taxonomic placement to genera or species.

Although not commonly known, some species form endospores (e.g.Candida species). These are asexual spores that are formed within their mother cell (hyphal or single cell). Strains of Candida and Metschnikowia may also form asexual resting spores called chlamydospores.

=== Sexual reproduction ===
Sexual reproduction is not known for all species of Saccharomycotina, but may happen in certain species if environmental conditions favour it (e.g. deficiency in nitrogen and carbohydrate). Sexual reproduction is well known in Saccharomyces cerevisiae. Here, the life cycle involves alternation between a haploid and a diploid phase. The life cycle proceeds as follows: Two cells of different mating type fuse and the nuclei undergo karyogamy. This results in a daughter cell with a diploid nucleus, functioning as an ascus, where meiosis occurs to produce haploid ascospores. When ascospores germinate, the haploid phase is established, and is maintained by further mitosis and budding. In most natural populations this phase is fairly short since ascospores fuse almost immediately after meiosis has occurred. This results in most yeast populations being diploid for most part of their life cycle.

In Saccharomycotina there are two mating types present. The mating types specify peptide hormones called pheromones and corresponding receptors for each type. These pheromones organize the mating. The pheromones do not affect the same mating type or diploids, but bind to receptors of different mating type. Interaction between pheromone and receptor results in altered metabolism to allow for fusion between cells of different mating type.

== Distribution and ecology ==
Saccharomycete yeasts are found in nearly all regions of the world, including hot deserts, polar areas, in freshwater, in salt water, and in the atmosphere. Their growth is mainly saprotrophic, but some members are important pathogens of plants and animals, including humans. They are often found in specialized habitats, e.g. small volumes of organic carbon rich liquid (e.g. flower nectar).

Examples of ecological modes in Saccharomycotina:

- Associations with insects
- Associations with plants, including Saccharomyces cerevisiae with grapes
- Plant parasitism (e.g. cotton boll rot by Eremothecium ashbyi, Eremothecium gossypii as pathogen on coffee, soybean and other crops)
- Saprotrophism on leaves and decaying wood (e.g. Ogataea)
- Human pathogens (e.g. species of Candida and Meyerozyma)

Although yeasts are commonly isolated from soil, few are believed to have soil as a primary habitat.

Accurate identification of species is important for understanding yeast ecology, something that is now possible with the increased use of DNA-based methods. Before molecular methods were available, identification was mainly based on morphology, something that resulted in misclassifications and further prevented reliable results of ecological research.

== Taxonomy ==
Saccharomycotina is a subdivision (subphylum) of the division (phylum) Ascomycota. It is a sister group to Pezizomycotina.

Yeasts were traditionally classified as a separate group of the fungal kingdom, but in recent years DNA-based methods have changed the understanding of phylogenetic relationships among fungi. Yeasts are considered to be a polyphyletic group, consisting of members of Basidiomycota, Taphrinomycotina, as well as Saccharomycotina. This realization has led to major changes in the phylogeny and taxonomy of Saccharomycotina.

In addition, the recent changes in the International Code of Nomenclature for algae, fungi and plants have had a major impact on the classification of fungi, including Saccharomycotina. The changes imply that a fungus can only bear one correct name, i.e. separate names for anamorphs and teleomorphs are no longer allowed. This involves major changes in Saccharomycotina taxonomy, as many species are currently described from both anamorphic and teleomorphic stages. The genus Candida is an example of a genus that is undergoing large-scale revisions.

Molecular identification methods are important tools for discovery of new species and subsequently give better understanding of biodiversity in this group. Much of the future classification of Saccharomycotina will rest on phylogenetic analysis of DNA sequences rather than on the morphological and developmental characters.

== Phylogeny ==
Phylogeny by Groenewald et al. 2023 (phylogenomic: supermatrix of BUSCO genes), along with proposed taxonomy. Species-level data is available.

- Saccharomycotina
  - - Lipomycetes
      - Lipomycetales
        Lipomycetaceae Novák & Zsolt 1961
  - - - Trigonopsidomycetes
        - Trigonopsidales
          Trigonopsidaceae Lachance & Kurtzman 2013
    - - - Dipodascomycetes
          - Dipodascales
            - Dipodascaceae
            - Trichomonascaceae
      - - - Alloascoideomycetes
            - Alloascoideales
              Alloascoideaceae Kurtzman & Robnett 2013
          - Sporopachydermiomycetes
            - Sporopachydermiales
              Sporopachydermiaceae Groenewald et al. 2023
        - - Pichiomycetes
            - - Alaninales
                Pachysolenaceae Groenewald et al. 2023
              - Pichiales
                Pichiaceae Zender 1925
            - - Serinales
                - Cephaloascaceae Batra 1973
                - - Metschnikowiaceae Kamienski 1899 ex Doweld 2013
                  - Debaryomycetaceae Kurtzman & Suzuki 2010
          - Saccharomycetes
            - - Ascoideales
                - Ascoideaceae Engl. 1892
                - Saccharomycopsidaceae Arx & Van der Walt 1987
            - - - Phaffomycetales
                  - Wickerhamomycetaceae Kurtzman, Robnett & Bas.-Powers 2008
                  - Phaffomycetaceae Yamada et al. 1999
              - - Saccharomycodales
                  Saccharomycodaceae Kudrjanzev 1960
                - Saccharomycetales
                  - Endomycetaceae Schröter 1893
                  - Saccharomycetaceae Winter 1881

Another phylogenomic study is Opulente et al., 2024, also with species-level data.

== See also ==
- Yeast in winemaking
- Saccharomyces Genome Database
