= Metschnikowia pulcherrima =

Scientific classification
- Kingdom: Fungi
- Division: Ascomycota
- Class: Saccharomycetes
- Order: Saccharomycetales
- Family: Metschnikowiaceae
- Genus: Metschnikowia
- Species: M. pulcherrima

Binomial name
- Metschnikowia pulcherrima Pitt & M.W. Mill.

Synonyms
- Candida pulcherrima; Torula pulcherrima; Torulopsis pulcherrima; Rhodotorula pulcherrima; Saccharomyces pulcherrimus; Cryptococcus castellanii

Species of fungus

Metschnikowia pulcherrima is a ubiquitous species of yeast, with numerous strains, belonging to the family Metschnikowiaceae, and found on grapes, cherries, flowers, spoiled fruit and consequently carried by fruit flies. It is a non-Saccharomyces yeast and plays an important role in the vinification of wine when it is present on grapes or winery equipment, and has historically seen use in South Africa’s wine industry. It is also being studied at the University of Bath as a possible alternative to the use of Palm oil, and early results show promise. M. pulcherrima is ovoid to ellipsoidal in shape and reproduces by budding. Its cells are globose and thick-walled, holding a single, large oil droplet of high refractive index. As the result of incomplete budding where cells remain attached after division, pseudohyphae may form under anaerobic conditions.

The strains of M. pulcherrima show strong biocontrol activity against various microorganisms. Its value to the wine industry lies in its antagonistic behaviour to other, undesirable yeast species involved in winemaking. In a 2014 study 7 strains of M. pulcherrima were examined for their activity against a large range of yeast strains including Pichia, Candida, Hanseniaspora, Kluyveromyces, Saccharomycodes, Torulaspora, Brettanomyces and Saccharomyces genera. A variety of inter-generic and intra-generic interactions were observed. One of the notable results was its lack of antimicrobial activity on the growth of Saccharomyces cerevisiae, while showing considerable antimicrobial activity on a range of spoilage yeasts, such as Brettanomyces/Dekkera, Hanseniaspora and Pichia genera. Fermentation experiments confirmed the antimicrobial activity of M. pulcherrima on non-Saccharomyces cultures. The antimicrobial activity observed is due to its iron immobilizing pigment pulcherrimin and pulcherriminic acid which sequester any iron in the medium, an element vital for the growth of other yeasts. The strain M. pulcherrima UMY15 has proved a very effective biocontrol agent against Penicillium roqueforti, Penicillium italicum, Penicillium expansum, and Aspergillus oryzae, but less effective on Fusarium sp. and Aspergillus niger. The UMY15 strain also proved very effective against postharvest pathogens.

For some time the wine sector has been seeking ways of producing wines with a low alcohol content. An obvious approach would be using wine yeast strains which are inefficient at converting grape sugars into ethanol, but in practice it was found that commercial wine yeasts all have much the same ethanol yields. Research on yeast population dynamics show that the use of M. pulcherrima in sequential inoculation with Saccharomyces uvarum during fermentation can produce Shirazi wine and Chardonnays of reduced alcohol content. The same regime has been tried in the brewing of beer and the result found to be potable with a novel aroma and flavour.. It is worth noting the significant synergy observed in the ternary co-inoculation of Lt + Mp yeasts for lactic acid production, resulting in 3.27 ± 1.04 g/L of lactic acid and a pH reduction of 0.33 ± 0.07 from an initial pH of 3.84, this high acidity also caused the tasters to perceive a lower tone in this wine, which resulted in a lower evolution of the wine.

Scientists have explored the use of pulcherrimin from M. pulcherrima as catalyst in the base-free oxidation of 5-hydroxymethylfurfural (5-HMF) to high-value products such as 2,5-furandicarboxylic acid (FDCA), a vital precursor for renewable bioplastics.

== Palm oil substitute ==
Palm oil is an edible vegetable oil extracted from the fruit of oil palms, mainly from Elaeis guineensis, some 60m tonnes of oil being produced annually. It has low production costs, a high melting point, is rich in saturated fats, and is widely used in the food and cosmetics industries. The high demand for palm oil has led to the establishing of vast palm plantations in South East Asia, causing deforestation and habitat erosion over large areas, water pollution, and increased greenhouse gas emissions over the affected region.

The Bath team aim to develop a substitute for palm oil using Metschnikowia pulcherrima by growing it on an industrial scale using the lignocellulose in agricultural and food waste as a source of polysaccharides. It is known that some species of oleaginous yeast when grown on sugars may convert between 20-80% of their biomass to oil. Although M. pulcherrima was not previously considered oleaginous, low temperatures in conjunction with restricted nutrients will prevent sporulation and lead to high concentrations of oil with properties close to those of palm oil. Furthermore the oil has potential as a biofuel in aviation and road transport.
