= Osmozyma mogii =

Scientific classification
- Kingdom: Fungi
- Division: Ascomycota
- Class: Saccharomycetes
- Order: Saccharomycetales
- Family: Metschnikowiaceae
- Genus: Osmozyma
- Species: O. mogii

Binomial name
- Osmozyma mogii (Vidal-Leir.) Q.M. Wang, Yurkov, Boekhout & F.Y. Bai, 2024

Synonyms
- Torulopsis miso mogi. nom .nud (1938a); Torulopsis miso alpha var.1 mogi nom.nud (1938a); Torulopsis miso alpha var.2 mogi nom.nud (1942)

Species of fungus

Osmozyma mogii is a species of yeast in the genus Osmozyma. It is present, fuchu miso use in the production of xylitol.
