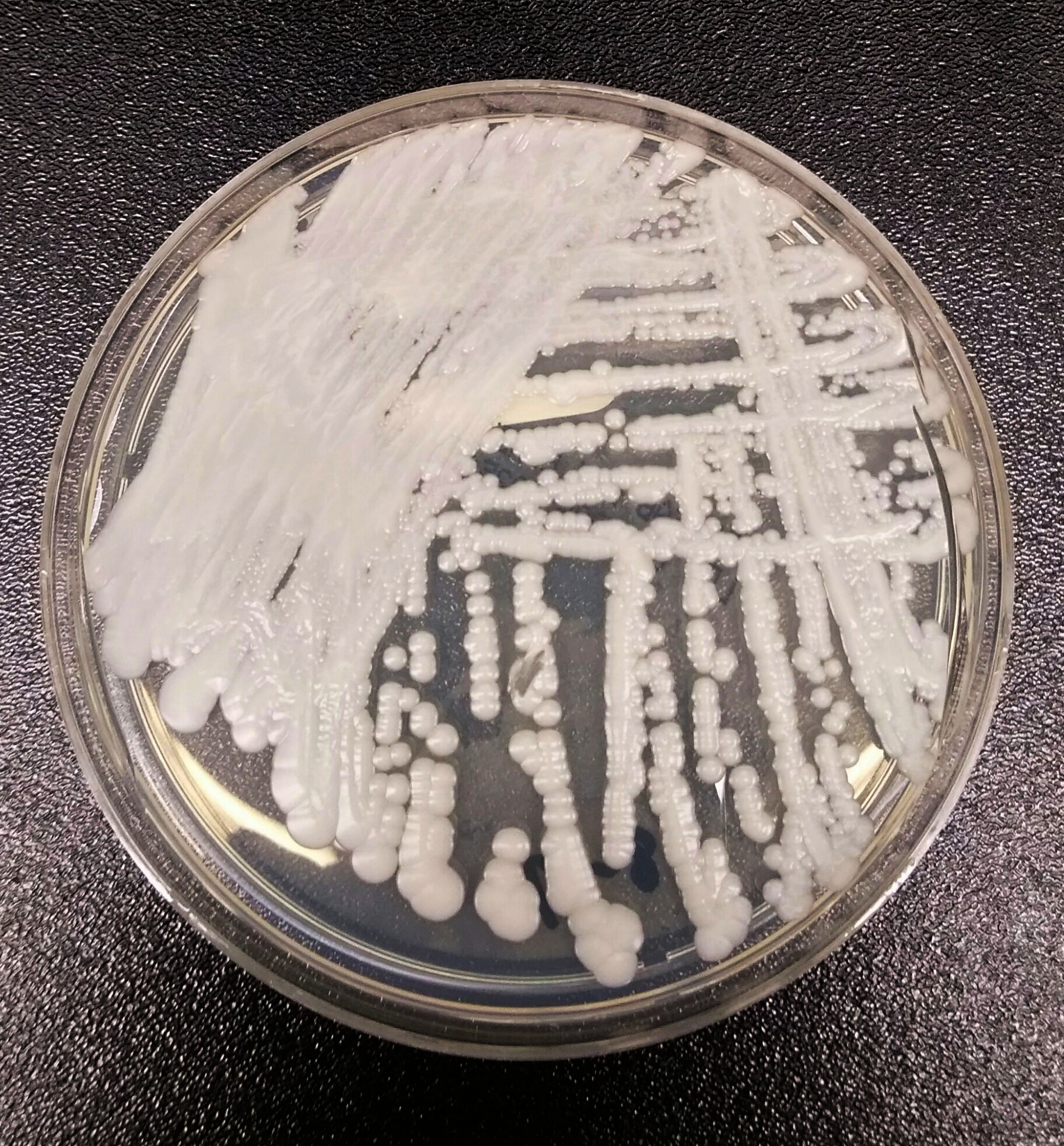

Scientific classification
- Kingdom: Fungi
- Division: Ascomycota
- Subdivision: Saccharomycotina
- Class: Saccharomycetes
- Order: Saccharomycetales
- Family: Debaryomycetaceae
- Genus: Candida
- Species: C. auris

Binomial name
- Candida auris (Satoh & Makimura) Q.M.Wang, Yurkov, Boekhout & F.Y.Bai (2024)

Type strain
- DSM 21092

Synonyms
- Candidozyma auris

= Candida auris =

Species of fungus

Candida auris (Candidozyma auris) is a species of fungus that grows as a yeast. It is one of the few species of the genus Candida (Candidozyma) which cause candidiasis in humans. Often, candidiasis is acquired in hospitals by patients with weakened immune systems. A colonizer of the skin in people most commonly in long term care medical facilities and other healthcare settings, C. auris may also persist on inanimate surfaces and medical devices for long periods of time. The environmental reservoirs of C. auris are not completely known. C. auris can cause invasive candidiasis (fungemia) in which the bloodstream, central nervous system, and internal organs are infected.

It has attracted widespread attention because of its multiple drug resistance. In cases where the fungus spreads to the bloodstream or distal organs, the mortality rate is 30-60%. Treatment is also complicated because it is easily misidentified as other Candida species.

Candida auris was first described in 2009 after it was isolated from the ear canal of a 70-year-old Japanese woman in Tokyo, Japan. In 2011, South Korea had its first cases of disease-causing C. auris. Reportedly, this spread across Asia and Europe, and first appeared in the U.S. in 2013.

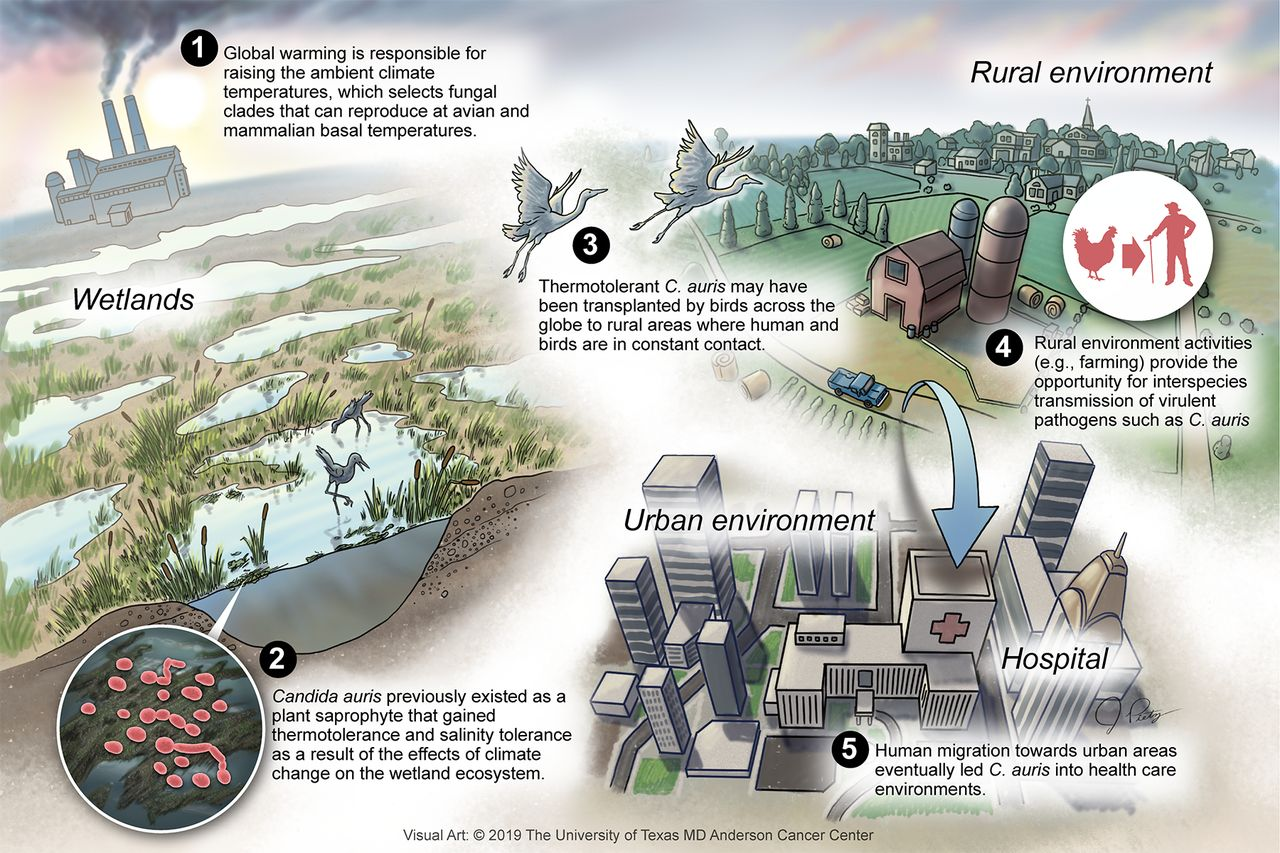
Proposed scheme for the emergence of C. auris.

Candida auris thrives in warmer environments with high salt (unlike other candida species) and is thought to have emerged as a human pathogen due to global warming. It is grouped into five different clades, each with distinct genetic and clinical (such as virulence and anti-fungal resistance) properties, as well as different geographic distributions.

DNA analysis of four distinct but drug-resistant strains of C. auris indicate an evolutionary divergence taking place at least 4,000 years ago, with a common leap among the four varieties into drug-resistance possibly linked to widespread azole-type antifungal use in agriculture. However, explanations for its emergence remain speculative.

An emerging infection, with cases rising globally, in 2022 the World Health Organization (WHO) classified C. auris as one of its 19 fungal "priority pathogens" (fungal pathogens that pose a threat to global health) with Candida auris being designated "critical priority" by the WHO.

== Identification and morphology ==
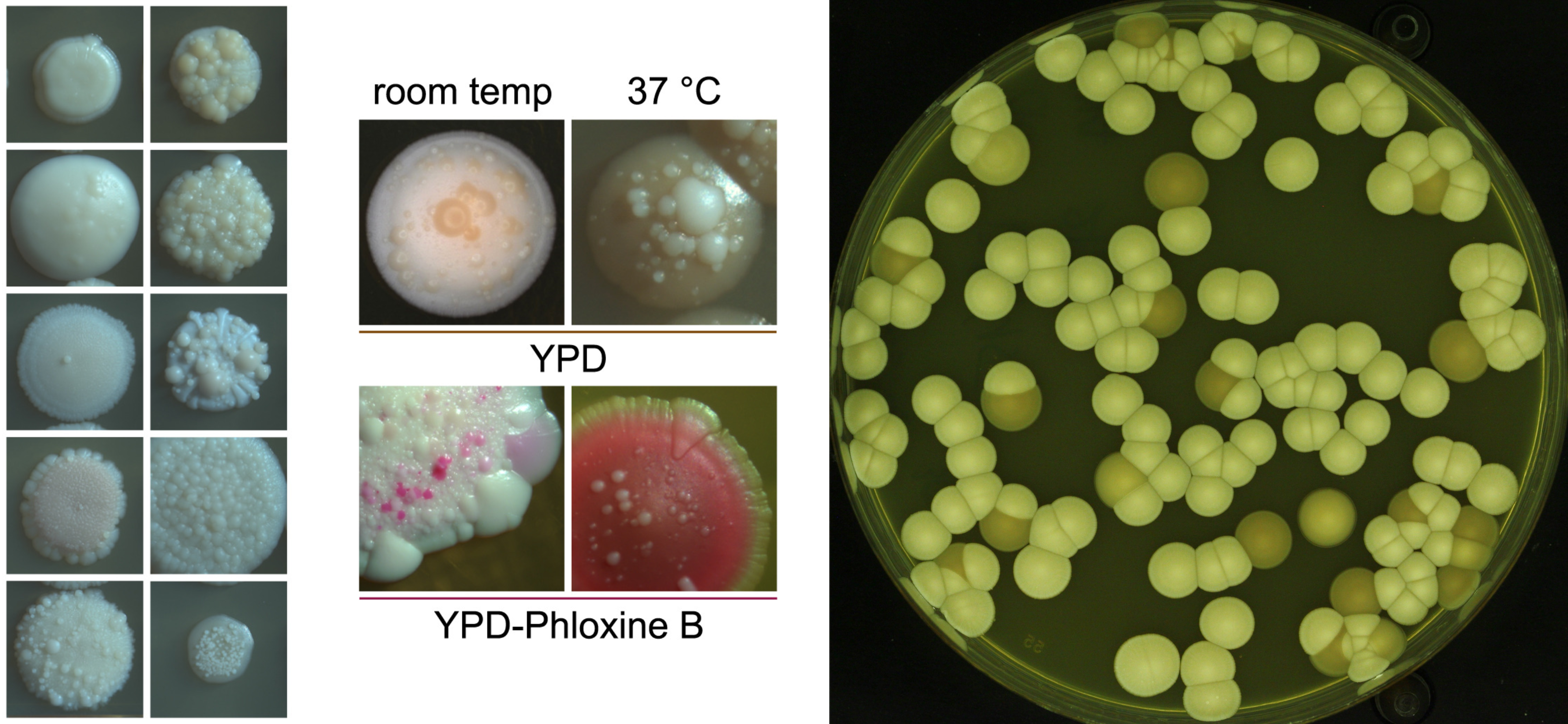
White-Brown epigenetic switching in Candida auris

First identified in 2009, C. auris is a species of ascomycetous fungus of the genus Candida that grows as a yeast. As a budding yeast, it rarely forms hyphae or pseudohyphae. Its name comes from the Latin word for ear, aus (genitive auris). It forms smooth, shiny, whitish-gray, viscous colonies on growth media. Microscopically, cells are ellipsoid in shape.

Candida auris can switch between two distinct cell states, called White and Brown, through a reversible epigenetic process. These cell states behave differently, showing changes in drug sensitivity, stress resistance, and ability to survive on skin, which helps the fungus adapt to harsh environments.

== Clinical significance ==
Candida auris has attracted increased clinical attention because of its multiple drug resistance.

In vitro, more than 90% of C. auris isolates are resistant to fluconazole and a range of 3–73% of C. auris isolates are resistant to voriconazole, while other triazoles (posaconazole, itraconazole, and isavuconazole) display better activity. Of isolates, 13% to 50% were reported resistant to amphotericin B, but most isolates are susceptible to echinocandins.

Treatment is complicated because C. auris is easily misidentified as various other Candida species. A brief outline of its clinical relevance as of 2016, understandable by general audiences, was published by the Center for Infectious Disease Research and Policy at the University of Minnesota.

C. auris is known to have a specific adhesion protein called surface colonization factor (Scfl1) which facilitates the fungus in adhering to human skin, inanimate surfaces, forming biofilms and spreading in the bloodstream. The Sclf1 fungal adhesin, first observed in candida auris, and another adhesin seen in other fungi (Iff4109), are thought to be a major contributor to the yeast's virulence.

Recent work shows that C. auris can fix a small amount of ambient CO_{2} by converting it into bicarbonate via carbonic anhydrase Nce103, sustaining mitochondrial energy metabolism and contributing to amphotericin B resistance in nutrient-limited niches such as skin. This carbonic sensing pathway also enables C. auris to utilize CO_{2} released by urease-positive skin bacteria, linking the skin microbiome to fungal fitness and colonization. These cooperative host–microbe interactions and intrinsic metabolic adaptation jointly enhance survival and drug tolerance in this fungus.

Mortality of people with C. auris bloodstream infections (BSI) ranged from 30 to 60%. Bloodstream infections can seed yeast to infect organs. Many of these people had other serious illnesses and conditions (comorbidities) that increased their risk of death.

Hydrogen peroxide is effective at killing C. auris in hospital surfaces, preventing it from spreading. The United States Environmental Protection Agency (EPA) also lists antimicrobial surface cleaners that are effective at eradicating C. auris.

== Vaccine development ==
As of October 2024, no human vaccine against Candida auris has been found. Experiments involving the NDV-3A vaccine have successfully immunized mice against the fungus. The vaccine also improved the protective efficacy of the antifungal drug micafungin against C. auris infection in the mouse bloodstream.

== Genome ==
Several draft genomes from whole genome sequencing have been published. C. auris has a genome size of 12.3–12.5 Mb with a GC-content of 44.5–44.8%. The C. auris genome was found to encode several genes for the ABC transporter family, a major facilitator superfamily, which helps to explain its multiple drug resistance. Its genome also encodes virulence-related gene families such as lipases, oligopeptide transporters, mannosyl transferases, and transcription factors, which facilitate colonization, invasion, and iron acquisition. Another factor contributing to antifungal resistance is the presence of a set of genes known to be involved in biofilm formation. More studies are needed to determine whether the phylogenetic divergence of C. auris clones exhibits region-specific patterns of invasiveness, virulence, and/or drug resistance.

== Diagnosis ==
Fungal culture is used in the diagnosis of clinical candida auris infection or colonization. Unlike other candidal species, candida auris can grow in culture at unusually high temperatures (40-42 degrees Celsius). Specialized growth media are required to grow C. auris in culture. Polymerase chain reaction (PCR) tests are available for C. auris infection of the blood, but no PCR swabs are available to detect skin colonization.

== Treatment ==
According to the CDC, C. auris skin colonization without clinical infection does not warrant treatment. Amphotericin B is the preferred antifungal for infected infants less than 2 months old as it can cross the blood brain barrier into the meninges and cerebrospinal fluid to effectively treat fungal meningitis. Babies are at an increased risk of fungal meningitis. For children 2 months or older and adults, echinocandins are the preferred anti-fungal for treatment. Antifungals are generally continued for 2 weeks after clearance of the bloodstream infection to ensure effective eradication. Serial blood cultures are required to assess treatment response. Amphotericin B deoxycholate is recommended in resource limited areas where echinocandins and anti-fungal susceptibility testing are usually unavailable. C. auris has a higher rate of treatment failure and infection recurrence after treatment compared to other candidida species.

Chronic indwelling medical devices such as central venous catheters or bladder catheters should be removed whenever possible during treatment to avoid seeding more yeast into the body from infected biofilms.

Those with eye symptoms should be evaluated for endophthalmitis, and if present, specific treatment would be required due to the limited eye penetration of echinocandins.

== Prevention ==
Strategies to prevent healthcare associated C. auris outbreaks are based on expert opinion and not supported by widespread or randomized-controlled trials. Experts have recommended screening patients for C. auris colonization upon admission to nursing facilities, using contact precautions and segregating patients colonized or with invasive infection in a specific area of the facility, and routine surface disinfection with floor cleaning as potential strategies to prevent outbreaks in healthcare settings. If possible, medical equipment (such as blood pressure cuffs) should not be shared between those infected/colonized with C. auris and those unaffected. If shared, such equipment should be disinfected prior to use.

== Epidemiology ==
=== Geographical differentiation ===
The phylogenetics of C. auris suggest distinct genotypes exist in different geographical regions, with substantial genomic diversity. A variety of sequence-based analytical methods have been used to support this finding.

Whole genome sequencing and analyses of isolates from Pakistan, India, South Africa, Venezuela, Japan, and previously sequenced C. auris genomes deposited in the National Center for Biotechnology Information's Sequence Read Archive identified a distinct geographic distribution of genotypes. Four distinct clades separated by tens of thousands of single-nucleotide polymorphisms were identified. The distribution of these clades segregated geographically to South Asia (India and Pakistan), South Africa, Venezuela, and Japan with minimal observed intraregion genetic diversity.

Amplified fragment length polymorphism analysis of C. auris isolates from the United Kingdom, India, Japan, South Africa, South Korea, and Venezuela suggested that the London isolates formed a distinct cluster compared to the others.

Comparison of ribosomal DNA sequences of C. auris isolates from Israel, Asia, South Africa, and Kuwait found that the strains from Israel were phylogenetically distinct from those from the other regions. Chatterjee et al. wrote in 2015, "Its actual global distribution remains obscure as the current commercial methods of clinical diagnosis misidentify it as C. haemulonii."

=== History ===
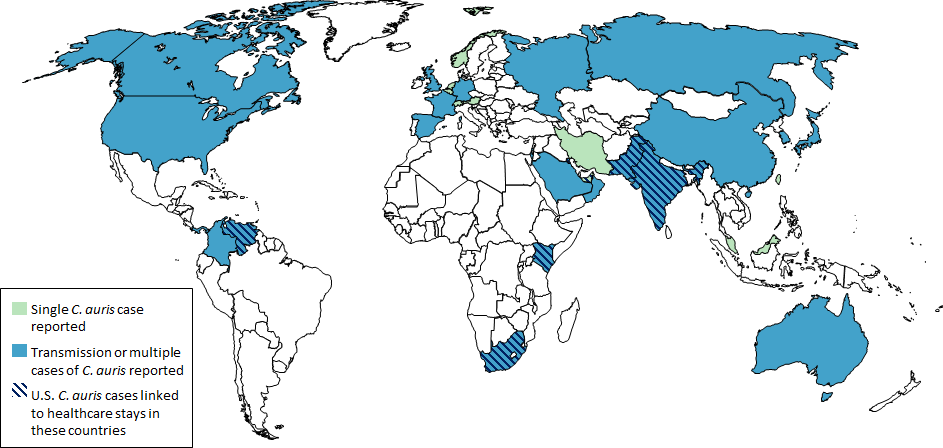
Candida auris infections, world distribution as of 2019

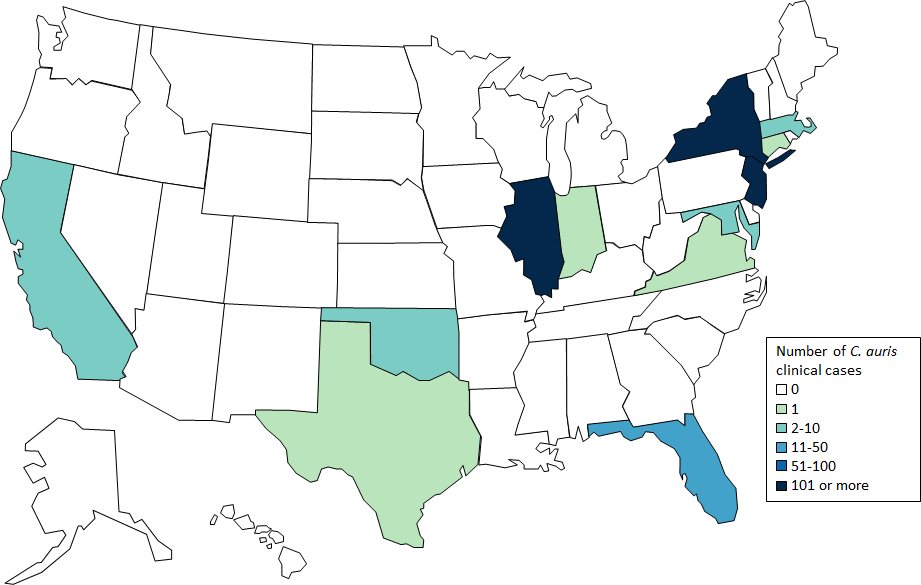
Map of C. auris infections in United States as of 2019

Candida auris was first described in 2009 after it was isolated from the ear canal of a 70-year-old Japanese woman at the Tokyo Metropolitan Geriatric Hospital in Japan. It was isolated based on its ability to grow in the presence of the fungicide micafungin, an echinocandin class fungicide. Phenotypic, chemotaxonomic and phylogenetic analyses established C. auris as a new strain of the genus Candida. It was transferred to the novel genus Candida in 2024.

The first three cases of disease-causing C. auris were reported from South Korea in 2011. Two isolates had been obtained during a 2009 study, and a third was discovered in a stored sample from 1996. All three cases had persistent fungemia, i.e. bloodstream infection, and two of the patients subsequently died due to complications. Notably, the isolates initially were misidentified as Candida haemulonii and Rhodotorula glutinis using standard methods, until sequence analysis correctly identified them as C. auris. These first cases emphasize the importance of accurate species identification and timely application of the correct antifungal for the effective treatment of candidiasis with C. auris.

During 2009–2011, 12 C. auris isolates were obtained from patients at two hospitals in Delhi, India. The same genotype was found in distinct settings - intensive care, surgical, medical, oncologic, neonatal, and pediatric wards, which were mutually exclusive with respect to health-care personnel. Most had persistent candidemia, and a high mortality rate was observed. All isolates were of the same clonal strain, however, and were only identified positively by DNA sequence analysis. As previously, the strain was misidentified with established diagnostic laboratory tests. The Indian researchers wrote in 2013 that C. auris was much more prevalent than published reports indicate, since most diagnostic laboratories do not use sequence-based methods for strain identification.

The fungus spread to other continents and eventually, a multidrug-resistant strain was discovered in Southeast Asian countries in early 2016. The emergence of Candida auris on three continents is proposed to be as a result of global warming caused by climate change and has raised the danger that increased warmth by itself will trigger adaptations on certain microbes to make them pathogenic for humans.

The first report of a C. auris outbreak in Europe was an October 2016 in Royal Brompton Hospital, a London cardiothoracic hospital. In April 2017, Centers for Disease Control and Prevention (CDC) director Anne Schuchat named it a "catastrophic threat". As of May 2017 the CDC had reported 77 cases in the United States. Of these, 69 were from samples collected in New York and New Jersey.

As of 31 August 2019, the number of cases of people having contracted C. auris in the United States had risen to 806, with 388 reported in New York, 137 in New Jersey, and 227 in Illinois, according to the CDC.

Since it was first observed in the United Kingdom, it has spread to more than 20 NHS Trust hospitals and infected 200 people.

As of April 2019, the CDC has documented cases of C. auris from: Australia, Austria, Belgium, Canada, China, Colombia, France, Germany, India, Iran, Israel, Japan, Kenya, Kuwait, Malaysia, Mexico, the Netherlands, Norway, Oman, Pakistan, Panama, Russia, Saudi Arabia, Singapore, South Africa, South Korea, Spain, Switzerland, Taiwan, Thailand, the United Arab Emirates, the United Kingdom, the United States, and Venezuela.

Candida auris fungus (C. auris) is a multidrug–resistant fungal infection that spreads in hospitals and is extremely deadly—killing as many as one in three who get it.

—Abby Haglage of Yahoo! Lifestyle, citing the Centers for Disease Control and Prevention

Arturo Casadevall, MD, PhD, and Molecular Microbiology and Immunology chair at Johns Hopkins Bloomberg School of Public Health stated:

What this study suggests is this is the beginning of fungi adapting to higher temperatures, and we are going to have more and more problems as the century goes on. Global warming will lead to selection of fungal lineages that are more thermally tolerant.

The COVID-19 pandemic has taken resources away from combating and tracking the fungus, which has led to outbreaks. Shortages of personal protective equipment forced medical personnel to reuse of gowns and masks during the pandemic, which has contributed to the fungi's spread. In 2021, the CDC identified strains of Candida auris that were immune to all existing medications used to treat fungal infections. Research published in Annals of Internal Medicine tracking the spread of C. auris from 2019 through 2021 revealed the fungus was present in over half of American states.

=== Context ===
Antimicrobial resistance in general is an increasingly common phenomenon. In 2010, two million people were reported to have contracted resistant infections in the United States – 23,000 fatally. (Note: According to official Centers for Disease Control estimations.) "[M]ore recent estimates from researchers at Washington University School of Medicine put the death toll at 162,000. Worldwide fatalities from resistant infections are estimated at 700,000 per year. C. auris is one of the many microbial contributors to this global AMR estimation.

== See also ==
- Candida blankii
- Candidozyma, a proposed genus that would include C. auris
