= Candidozyma =

Scientific classification
- Kingdom: Fungi
- Division: Ascomycota
- Class: Saccharomycetes
- Order: Saccharomycetales
- Family: Metschnikowiaceae
- Genus: Candidozyma; Q.M.Wang, Yurkov, Boekhout & F.Y.Bai (2024)

Species
- See text

Genus of fungi

Candidozyma is a genus of yeasts in the family Metschnikowiaceae. The genus includes Candidozyma auris (widely known as Candida auris in medical and public health literature) and a set of close relatives in the Candidozyma haemuli species complex. Established in 2024 based on genome-scale studies, the genus comprises thirteen species that were previously placed in the catch-all genus Candida but shown through DNA evidence to belong in Metschnikowiaceae. Members reproduce asexually by budding and occur in diverse habitats including flowers, tree bark, and clinical settings, with several species recognized as multidrug-resistant opportunistic pathogens causing healthcare-associated infections. The transfer of Candida auris to Candidozyma has sparked debate in the medical community about nomenclature stability, with many clinicians continuing to use the established name pending broader consensus.

== Taxonomy ==
Candidozyma was proposed in 2024 for the "Candida auris–Candida haemuli" (CAH) clade, a lineage of asexually reproducing yeasts in the family Metschnikowiaceae. Species in this group had long been placed in Candida under a broad, convenience-based concept for yeasts without a known sexual state, but phylogenomic analyses showed that the CAH clade is far removed from the type of Candida (Candida tropicalis) and instead belongs within Metschnikowiaceae. The generic name refers to the Candida-like asexual morphology of its members.

The genus is typified by Candidozyma auris and was circumscribed using genome-scale phylogenies together with genome similarity measures (including average amino acid identity and the proportion of conserved proteins), as well as diagnostic sets of protein families. Candidozyma is closely related to the Candida tolerans clade, which the same study treated as a separate genus (Osmozyma); one phenotypic difference reported between the two is that Candidozyma assimilates melezitose whereas Osmozyma does not. The 2024 treatment transferred multiple species from Candida into Candidozyma, including Candidozyma haemuli (often cited previously as C. haemulonii), C. duobushaemuli, C. pseudohaemuli, C. vulturna, C. heveicola, C. ruelliae, C. chanthaburiensis, C. konsanensis, C. metrosideri, C. ohialehuae and C. khanbhai, and it also recombined Candida haemuli var. vulneris in Candidozyma.

A later study expanded the Candidozyma haemuli species complex by describing Candidozyma molenica. It was based on strains recovered from clinical screening swabs in the Netherlands as well as strains isolated from flowers collected in Belize. In ribosomal DNA phylogenies (ITS and LSU D1/D2), C. molenica formed a well-supported lineage closest to Candidozyma heveicola and grouped with taxa that had previously been reported mainly from environmental sources (the "environmental cluster" of the species complex).

The transfer of Candida auris to Candidozyma has also prompted discussion about nomenclature stability in clinical use. A 2025 comment letter argued that, because the species is now placed outside Candida, continuing to use the disease label "candidiasis" for infections caused by C. auris may be ambiguous, and suggested that terms such as "candidozosis" or "candidozymiasis" could be evaluated for clarity in clinical and surveillance contexts. In a published reply, members of an international working group on clinical-fungal nomenclature cautioned that adopting Candidozyma auris (and renaming the associated disease) is premature; they pointed to limited sampling in the underlying taxonomic study, ongoing instability as additional species are added, and the strong entrenchment of "Candida auris" in public health practice, and they recommended retaining "Candida auris" and "candidiasis" until broader agreement is reached.

== Description ==
Species of Candidozyma are yeasts that are mainly known from asexual growth. Cells multiply by multilateral budding (buds can form from more than one point on the cell), and cultures typically produce cream to yellowish-cream (sometimes white) colonies with a smooth, butyrous texture. Under ordinary conditions the yeasts usually do not form pseudohyphae or true hyphae, although filamentous growth has been reported under particular conditions, such as during aerobic growth.

A sexual stage has not been observed, but genome data show that many mating- and meiosis-related genes are retained and that MTLa and MTLα mating-type loci occur in different populations, suggesting that mating may occur and that a sexual cycle could be induced under suitable conditions. The genus includes several multidrug-resistant opportunists associated with humans and animals, as well as species isolated from natural habitats such as flowers and tree bark and, in some cases, from plant or marine substrates. Clinical series using the older name "Candida haemulonii complex" (now included in Candidozyma) report both colonization and bloodstream infection by these yeasts. A French study found that cases were concentrated in tropical regions (including Caribbean and Latin American settings) and that isolates commonly showed decreased in vitro susceptibility to fluconazole and amphotericin B; in Martinique, skin carriage was frequent in the community and was linked to intensive-care patients with foreign devices.

In culture, C. molenica produced white, smooth, butyrous colonies and somewhat globose to ovoid budding cells. Filamentous growth was usually absent on routine plate cultures, but pseudohyphae developed in slide cultures, including at 37 °C; the authors did not observe ascospore formation on the sporulation media they tested. Growth occurred up to 37 °C but not at 40 °C. The same study also shows why confirmatory identification is often needed for this group in clinical work. Their initial MALDI-TOF mass spectroscopy result suggested Candidozyma pseudohaemuli but with low confidence, and colony colours on chromogenic media overlapped with several other yeasts; the authors therefore generated a MALDI-TOF reference profile to help distinguish C. molenica from close relatives.

The best-known member of the genus is Candidozyma auris (still widely referred to in clinical and public health literature as Candida auris), an opportunistic yeast associated with healthcare outbreaks and frequent multidrug resistance. Because the taxonomic transfer is recent and still being debated for clinical usage, disease discussions commonly continue to use established terms such as "candidiasis" for infections caused by this species, pending wider consensus on whether any terminology change is warranted.

== Species ==
The genus contains Candidozyma auris and other members of the Candidozyma haemuli species complex; the complex was expanded in 2025 with the description of Candidozyma molenica from both clinical and environmental isolates.

- Candidozyma auris (Satoh & Makimura) Q.M.Wang, Yurkov, Boekhout & F.Y.Bai (2024)
- Candidozyma chanthaburiensis (Limtong & Yongman. ex F.Hagen) Q.M.Wang, Yurkov, Boekhout & F.Y.Bai (2024)
- Candidozyma duobushaemuli (Cend.-Bueno, Kolecka, Alastr.-Izq., Gómez-López, Cuenc.-Estr. & Boekhout) Q.M.Wang, Yurkov, Boekhout & F.Y.Bai (2024)
- Candidozyma haemuli (Uden & Kolip.) Q.M.Wang, Yurkov, Boekhout, F.Y.Bai (2024)
- Candidozyma heveicola (F.Y.Bai & S.A.Wang) Q.M.Wang, Yurkov, Boekhout & F.Y.Bai (2024)
- Candidozyma khanbhai (A.W.de Jong & F.Hagen) Q.M.Wang, Yurkov, Boekhout & F.Y.Bai (2024)
- Candidozyma konsanensis (Sarawan, Mahakhan, Jindam., K.Vichitph., S.Vichitph. & Sawaengk. ex F.Hagen) Q.M.Wang, Yurkov, Boekhout & F.Y.Bai (2024)
- Candidozyma metrosideri (Klaps, C.Vega, C.M.Herrera, Junker, B.Lievens & Álvarez-Pérez ex F.Hagen) Q.M.Wang, Yurkov, Boekhout & F.Y.Bai (2024)
- Candidozyma molenica Zandijk, van der Bruggen, M.Groenew. & F.Hagen (2025)
- Candidozyma ohialehuae (Klaps, C.Vega, C.M.Herrera, Junker, B.Lievens & Álvarez-Pérez ex F.Hagen) Q.M.Wang, Yurkov, Boekhout & F.Y.Bai (2024)
- Candidozyma pseudohaemuli (Sugita, M.Takash., Poonwan & Mekha) Q.M.Wang, Yurkov, Boekhout & F.Y.Bai (2024)
- Candidozyma ruelliae (Saluja & G.S.Prasad) Q.M.Wang, Yurkov, Boekhout & F.Y.Bai (2024)
- Candidozyma vulturna (Sipiczki & Tap ex F.Hagen) Q.M.Wang, Yurkov, Boekhout & F.Y.Bai (2024)
