= Torula =

Scientific classification
- Kingdom: Fungi
- Division: Ascomycota
- Class: Saccharomycetes
- Order: Phaffomycetales
- Family: Phaffomycetaceae
- Genus: Cyberlindnera
- Species: C. jadinii

Binomial name
- Cyberlindnera jadinii (Sartory, R. Sartory, Jos. Weill & J. Mey.) Minter, 2009

Synonyms
- Homotypic, teleomorph: Hansenula jadinii (Sartory, R. Sartory, Weill & J. Mey.) Wick. [as 'jadini'], 1951; Lindnera jadinii (Sartory, R. Sartory, Weill & J. Mey.) Kurtzman, Robnett & Bas.-Powers, 2008; Saccharomyces jadinii Sartory, R. Sartory, Weill & J. Mey., 1932; Pichia jadinii (Sartory, R. Sartory, Weill & J. Mey.) Kurtzman, 1984; Heterotypic, anamorph: Torula utilis Henneberg, 1926; Torulopsis utilis (Henneberg) Lodder, 1934; Candida utilis (Henneberg) Lodder & Kreger-van Rij, 1952; Cryptococcus utilis (Henneberg) H.W. Anderson & C.E. Skinner, 1947; Torulopsis utilis (Henneberg) Lodder, 1934, var. utilis; Candida guilliermondii var. nitratophila Diddens & Lodder, 1942; Candida guilliermondii var. nitratophila Diddens & Lodder, 1957; Candida amidevorans Balloni, G. Florenz., G. Mazza & Polsin. ,1987

Type of yeast

Cyberlindnera jadinii, commonly known as torula in the food industry, is a species of yeast. It is used as a savory, protein-rich food ingredient as well as a food bait for insects. It is also commonly known as the anamorphic name Candida utilis.

== Taxonomic history ==
Lindnera jadinii was split from Pichia in 2008 under a genetic study. The genus name Lindera was determined to be illegitimate, and changed to Cyberlindnera jadinii in 2009. The species was originally isolated from cow abscesses. Natural populations are mainly diploid.

Torula utilis, renamed Candida utilis in 1952, was originally isolated in flowers. It is also found as a contaminant in industrial fermentations, and also from human and animal sources. It represents a triploid, asexual lineage of C. jadinii. In 2013 Candida utilis ceased to be recognised as an alternate name of Cyberlindnera jadinii, under the "one fungus, one name" policy of the International Botanical Congress.

== Use ==
=== Food flavoring ===
Torula, in its inactive form (usually labeled as torula yeast), is widely used as a flavoring in processed foods and pet foods. It is often grown on wood liquor, a byproduct of paper production, which is rich in wood sugars (xylose). It is pasteurized and spray-dried to produce a fine, light grayish-brown powder with a slightly yeasty odor and gentle, slightly meaty taste.

Like the flavor enhancer monosodium glutamate (MSG), torula is rich in glutamic acid. Therefore, it has become a popular replacement among manufacturers wishing to eliminate MSG or hide flavor enhancer usage in an ingredients list. Cyberlindnera jadinii (which in these contexts is often still labelled with its synonym Candida utilis) can be used, in a blend of various other yeasts, as secondary cheese starter culture "to inoculate pasteurised milk, which mimic the natural yeast flora of raw milk and improve cheese flavour. Other functions of the added yeast organisms are the neutralisation of the curd (lactate degradation) and galactose consumption."

=== Bio-fermented lipid production and topical applications ===
In addition to single-cell protein production, strains of Cyberlindnera jadinii (formerly Candida utilis) are utilized in industrial biotechnology to cultivate bio-fermented single-cell oils as sustainable alternatives to petroleum and plant-derived lipids such as palm oil without its social and environmental penalty.

When cultured under lipid-accumulating conditions, the yeast synthesizes a triglyceride matrix predominantly composed of oleic, palmitic, stearic, and linoleic fatty acids. In dermatological science and formulation design, this bio-fermented lipid is designated under the INCI name Linoleic/Oleic/Palmitic Triglyceride.

The lipid fraction of C. jadinii naturally contains unsaponifiable bioactive compounds, including squalene, phytosterols (such as ergosterol), and yeast-synthesized carotenoid antioxidants, notably beta-carotene and torulene. In topical skin formulations, these microbial lipids function as both emollients and occlusives—supporting skin barrier function, modulating transepidermal water loss (TEWL), and providing topical antioxidant and anti-inflammatory activity for sensitive skin.

=== Insect trap ===
Torula finds accepted use in Europe and California for the organic control of olive flies. When dissolved in water, it serves as a food attractant, with or without additional pheromone lures, in McPhail and OLIPE traps, which drown the insects. In field trials in Sonoma County, California, mass trappings reduced crop damage to an average of 30% compared to almost 90% in untreated controls.

== See also ==
- Nutritional yeast
