= Saccharomycopsis =

Scientific classification
- Domain: Eukaryota
- Kingdom: Fungi
- Division: Ascomycota
- Class: Saccharomycetes
- Order: Saccharomycetales
- Family: Saccharomycopsidaceae
- Genus: Saccharomycopsis; Schiønning

Genus of fungi

Saccharomycopsis is a genus of fungi belonging to the family Saccharomycopsidaceae.

The genus has cosmopolitan distribution.

== Species ==
Species:

- Saccharomycopsis amapae (P.B.Morais, C.A.Rosa, S.A.Mey., Mend.-Hagler & Hagler) Casarég. & N.Jacques
- Saccharomycopsis babjevae (G.I.Naumov & M.T.Sm.) Casarég. & N.Jacques
- Saccharomycopsis capsularis Schiønning
- Saccharomycopsis crataegensis Kurtzman & Wick., Antonie van Leeuwenhoek
- Saccharomycopsis fermentans (C.F. Lee, F.L. Lee, W.H. Hsu & Phaff) Kurtzman & Robnett
- Saccharomycopsis fibuliger (Lindner) Klöcker
- Saccharomycopsis fibuligera (Lindner) Klöcker
- Saccharomycopsis fodiens Lachance, C.A. Rosa & E.J. Carvajal
- Saccharomycopsis guttulatus (C.P. Robin) Schiønning
- Saccharomycopsis guyanensis Jacques & Casaregola
- Saccharomycopsis hordei (Saito) Klöcker
- Saccharomycopsis javanensis (Klöcker) Kurtzman & Robnett
- Saccharomycopsis lassenensis (Kurtzman) Casareg. & N. Jacques
- Saccharomycopsis lindneri (Saito) Klöcker
- Saccharomycopsis lipolytica (Wick., Kurtzman & Herman) Yarrow
- Saccharomycopsis malanga (Dwidjos.) Kurtzman, Vesonder & M.J. Smiley
- Saccharomycopsis microspora (L.R. Batra) Kurtzman
- Saccharomycopsis olivae Jacques, M. Coton, E. Coton & Casaregola
- Saccharomycopsis oosterbeekiorum M. Groenew. & M.T. Sm
- Saccharomycopsis oxydans S. Nasr & A. Yurkov
- Saccharomycopsis phaeospora (Boedijn) Arx
- Saccharomycopsis phalli F.H. Tian, X.X. Yuan & K.Q. Peng
- Saccharomycopsis phalluae F.H. Tian, X.X. Yuan & K.Q
- Saccharomycopsis pseudolipolytica Blagodatskaya
- Saccharomycopsis schoenii (Nadson & Krassiln.) Kurtzman & Robnett
- Saccharomycopsis selenospora (Nadson & Krassiln.) Kurtzman & Robnett
- Saccharomycopsis synnaedendra Van der Walt & D.B. Scott
- Saccharomycopsis vini (Kreger-van Rij) Van der Walt & D.B. Scott
