= Ascoidea asiatica =

Scientific classification
- Kingdom: Fungi
- Division: Ascomycota
- Class: Saccharomycetes
- Order: Saccharomycetales
- Family: Ascoideaceae
- Genus: Ascoidea
- Species: A. asiatica

Binomial name
- Ascoidea asiatica L.R. Batra & Francke-Grosman (1964)

Species of fungus

Ascoidea asiatica is a species of yeast in the Ascoideaceae family discovered in 1964.

== Biochemistry ==
In 2018, it was reported by researchers at the University of Bath and the Max-Planck Institute for Biophysical Chemistry that the CUG sense codon in this yeast is translated by two different tRNAs, one coding for serine and one for leucine, with approximately equal probability. This is the first reported instance of a proteome that is stochastically encoded from the genome. This codon is rarely used in this species, which has led to the suggestion that stochastic encoding is deleterious to the organism.
