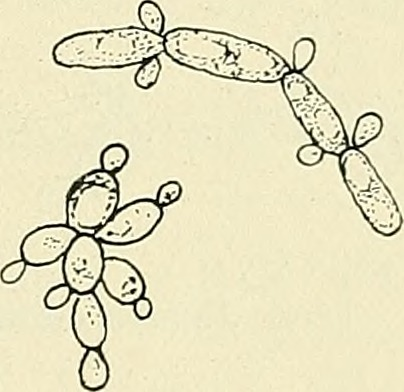
- Pichia gentianae young cells

Scientific classification
- Kingdom: Fungi
- Division: Ascomycota
- Class: Pichiomycetes
- Order: Pichiales
- Family: Pichiaceae
- Genus: Pichia; Hansen, 1904

Species
- See text

Synonyms
- Azymohansenula E.K.Novák & Zsolt; Hyphopichia Mycoderma; Desmazières, 1827 Mycokluyveria; Ciferri & Redaelli, 1947 Petasospora; Boidin & Abadie, 1955 Zygohansenula; J.Lodder, 1932 Zygowillia; (Klöcker) Kudrjanzev, 1960 Zymopichia; E.K.Novák & Zsolt, 1961

= Pichia =

Genus of fungi

Pichia (Hansenula and Hyphopichia are obsolete synonyms) is a genus of yeasts in the family Pichiaceae with spherical, elliptical, or oblong acuminate cells. Pichia is a teleomorph, and forms hat-shaped, hemispherical, or round ascospores during sexual reproduction. The anamorphs of some Pichia species are Candida species. The asexual reproduction is by multilateral budding.

The genus name of Pichia is in honour of Pico Pichi (1862–1933), who was an Italian botanist and Professor of natural history and plant pathology at a viticulture school in the town of Conegliano in the Province of Treviso.

The genus was circumscribed by Emil Christian Hansen in Centralbl. Bakteriol., 2. Abt., 12 on pages 533–538 in 1904.

Lactose is neither fermented nor assimilated by these species. The behaviour with regard to other carbohydrates is dependent on the different species. Nitrate is always assimilated.

More than 100 species of this genus are known. GBIF lists 155. A number of Pichia species have been reassigned to other genera, see below. As a result, Species Fungorum accepts only 32 species (see below for list).

== Taxonomy ==
A number of species have been moved to other genera. These include moves to Wickerhamomyces (W. canadensis, W. ciferri, W. lynferdii, W. salvicola and W. subpelliculosa), to Starmera, to Cyberlindnera, to Ogataea and many others.

== Occurrence ==
Some Pichia (in the broad, pre-split sense) interfere with the fermentation process for alcohol production. In winemaking, some species of Pichia can create potential faults in wines. Most are found in decaying plants; some live in close symbiosis with insects, which live on decaying plants.

Some Pichia (sensu lato) representatives can be found in raw milk and cheese, such as P. anomala (now named Wickerhamomyces anomalus). W. anomalus has been shown to combat the undesirable mold Aspergillus flavus, which contaminates food sources such as tree nuts and corn, and produces aflatoxins. Researchers of the Agricultural Research Service found that when pistachio trees were treated with W. anomalus, the growth of A. flavus was inhibited up to 97%. In addition to inhibiting A. flavus, the yeast may also help protect other agricultural crops from unwanted molds that affect the crop's taste, texture, yield, and safety. In smeared-surface ripened cheese, the most important species is P. membranifaciens that also occurs on cream cheese. The formation of a so-called pellicle is typical.

Another former member of the genus, P. pastoris (now Komagataella phaffii), is widely used in molecular biology and biotechnology as an expression system. P. angusta (now called Ogataea polymorpha), is a model organism for studying the functions of peroxisomes and their underlying molecular biology.

Some Pichia species (e.g. P. ohmeri, now Kodamaea ohmeri) have recently been clinically proven to be pathogens, better known as so-called opportunistic pathogens in immunocompromised humans.

== Species ==
As accepted by Species Fungorum;

- Pichia barkeri Phaff, Starmer, Tredick & V. Aberdeen 1987
- Pichia cactophila Starmer, Phaff, M. Miranda & M.W. Mill. 1978
- Pichia cecembensis Bhadra, R.Sreen. Rao & Shivaji, 2007
- Pichia cephalocereana (Phaff, Starmer & Tredick) Kurtzman, Robnett & Bas.-Powers 2008
- Pichia deserticola Phaff, Starmer, Tredick & M. Miranda 1985
- Pichia eremophila (Phaff, Starmer & Tredick) Kurtzman, Robnett & Bas.-Powers 2008
- Pichia exigua (Phaff, M.W. Mill. & M. Miranda) Kurtzman, Robnett & Bas.-Powers 2008
- Pichia fermentans Lodder (1932
- Pichia galeiformis A. Endo & Goto 1987
- Pichia garciniae Bhadra & Shivaji 2008
- Pichia gijzeniarum M. Groenew. & M.T. Sm. 2018
- Pichia heedii Phaff, Starmer, M. Miranda & M.W. Mill. 1978
- Pichia kluyveri Bedford ex Kudryavtsev 1960
- Pichia kudriavzevii Biodin, Pignal & Besson 1965
- Pichia megalospora Kuraishi 1958
- Pichia membranifaciens E.C. Hansen 1904
- Pichia methanothermo Minami & Yamamura 1978
- Pichia myanmarensis Nagats., H. Kawas. & T. Seki 2005
- Pichia nakasei J.A. Barnett, R.W. Payne & Yarrow 1983
- Pichia nanzhaoensis F.L. Hui & K.F. Liu 2018
- Pichia nongkratonensis Nakase & Jindam. 2005
- Pichia norvegensis Leask & Yarrow 1976
- Pichia occidentalis (Kurtzman, M.J. Smiley & C.J. Johnson) Kurtzman, Robnett & Bas.-Powers 2008
- Pichia paraexigua W.L. Gao, K.F. Liu, L.G. Yao & F.L. Hui 2018
- Pichia porticicola Ninomiya, Mikata, Nakagiri, Nakase & H. Kawas. 2010
- Pichia pseudocactophila Holzschu, Phaff, Tredick & Hedgec. 1983
- Pichia punctispora (Mélard) Stell.-Dekk. 1931
- Pichia rarassimilans Endoh, M. Suzuki, Omoto & Benno 2008
- Pichia scaptomyzae C. Ramírez & A.E. González 1984
- Pichia scutulata Phaff, M.W. Mill. & M. Miranda 1976
- Pichia sporocuriosa G. Péter, Tornai-Leh., Dlauchy & Vitányi 2000
- Pichia terricola Van der Walt 1957
- Pichia uvarum Verona & Luchetti 1941
