= Hermanozyma ubatubensis =

Scientific classification
- Domain: Eukaryota
- Kingdom: Fungi
- Division: Ascomycota
- Class: Pichiomycetes
- Order: Serinales
- Family: Metschnikowiaceae
- Genus: Hermanozyma
- Species: H. ubatubensis

Binomial name
- Hermanozyma ubatubensis (Ruivo, Pagnocca, Lachance & C.A. Rosa) Q.M. Wang, Yurkov, Boekhout & F.Y. Bai, 2024

Species of fungus

Hermanozyma ubatubensis is a yeast species. Its type strain is UNESP 01-247R^{T} (=CBS 10003^{T} =NRRL Y-27812^{T}).
