= Wickerhamomyces =

Scientific classification
- Kingdom: Fungi
- Division: Ascomycota
- Class: Saccharomycetes
- Order: Phaffomycetales
- Family: Wickerhamomycetaceae
- Genus: Wickerhamomyces; Kurtzman, Robnett & Bas.-Powers, 2008

Type species
- Wickerhamomyces canadensis Kurtzman, Robnett & Basehoar-Powers

Species
- See text

Genus of fungi

Wickerhamomyces is a genus of fungi within the Phaffomycetales order. It is placed within the family of Phaffomycetaceae.

== Description ==
The fungi has asexual reproduction and that budding is multilateral on a narrow base. The cells are spherical, ovoid, or elongate in shape. Pseudohyphae and true hyphae (a long, branching, filamentous structure) are produced by some species. In sexual reproduction, it is found that the asci (spore bearing cell) may be unconjugated or show conjugation between a cell and its bud or between independent cells. Some species are heterothallic (species have sexes that reside in different individuals). Asci may be persistent or deliquescent and form one to four ascospores that may be hat-shaped or spherical with an equatorial ledge.

== Taxonomy ==
The genus name of Wickerhamomyces is in honour of Lynferd J. Wickerham (1910-1990), who was an American botanist and taxonomist, who worked at the National Center for Agricultural Utilization Research. In 1970, Wickerham had authored 'Genus 14. Pachysolen Boidin et Adzet, pp. 448–454. In J. Lodder (ed.), The Yeasts. A taxonomic study, 2nd ed. North-Holland Publishing Co., Amsterdam.'

The genus was circumscribed by Cletus P. Kurtzman, Christie J. Robnett and Eleanor Basehoar-Powers in FEMS Yeast Res. vol.8 (Issue 6) on page 951 in 2008.

== Species ==
As accepted by GBIF;

- Wickerhamomyces alni (Phaff, M.W.Mill. & M.Miranda) Kurtzman, Robnett & Bas.-Powers
- Wickerhamomyces anomalus (E.C.Hansen) Kurtzman, Robnett & Bas.-Powers (25)
- Wickerhamomyces arborarius S.A.James, E.J.Carvajal, Barahona, T.C.Harr., C.F.Lee, C.J.Bond & I.N.Roberts
- Wickerhamomyces bisporus (O.Beck) Kurtzman, Robnett & Bas.-Powers
- Wickerhamomyces bovis (Uden & Carmo Souza) Kurtzman, Robnett & Bas.-Powers
- Wickerhamomyces canadensis (Wick.) Kurtzman, Robnett & Bas.-Powers
- Wickerhamomyces chambardii (C.Ramírez & Boidin) Kurtzman, Robnett & Bas.-Powers
- Wickerhamomyces chaumierensis M.Groenew., V.Robert & M.T.Sm.
- Wickerhamomyces ciferrii (Lodder) Kurtzman, Robnett & Bas.-Powers
- Wickerhamomyces edaphicus Limtong, Yongman., H.Kawas. & Fujiyama, 2009
- Wickerhamomyces hampshirensis (Kurtzman) Kurtzman, Robnett & Bas.-Powers
- Wickerhamomyces kurtzmanii A.H.Li, Y.G.Zhou & Q.M.Wang
- Wickerhamomyces lynferdii (Van der Walt & Johannsen) Kurtzman, Robnett & Bas.-Powers
- Wickerhamomyces menglaensis F.L.Hui & L.N.Huang
- Wickerhamomyces mori F.L.Hui, Liang Chen, X.Y.Chu, Niu & T.Ke
- Wickerhamomyces mucosus (Wick. & Kurtzman) Kurtzman, Robnett & Bas.-Powers
- Wickerhamomyces ochangensis K.S.Shin
- Wickerhamomyces onychis (Yarrow) Kurtzman, Robnett & Bas.-Powers
- Wickerhamomyces orientalis Sipiczki, S.Nasr, H.D.T.Nguyen & Soudi
- Wickerhamomyces patagonicus V.de García, Brizzio, C.A.Rosa, Libkind & Van Broock
- Wickerhamomyces pijperi (Van der Walt & Tscheuschner) Kurtzman, Robnett & Bas.-Powers
- Wickerhamomyces queroliae C.A.Rosa, P.B.Morais, Lachance & Pimenta
- Wickerhamomyces rabaulensis (Soneda & S.Uchida) Kurtzman, Robnett & Bas.-Powers
- Wickerhamomyces scolytoplatypi Ninomiya
- Wickerhamomyces siamensis Kaewwich., Yongman., H.Kawas. & Limtong
- Wickerhamomyces silvicola (Wick.) Kurtzman, Robnett & Bas.-Powers
- Wickerhamomyces strasburgensis (C.Ramírez & Boidin) Kurtzman, Robnett & Bas.-Powers
- Wickerhamomyces subpelliculosus (Kurtzman) Kurtzman, Robnett & Bas.-Powers
- Wickerhamomyces sydowiorum (D.B.Scott & Van der Walt) Kurtzman, Robnett & Bas.-Powers
- Wickerhamomyces tratensis Nakase, Jindam., Am-In, Ninomiya & H.Kawas.
- Wickerhamomyces xylosica Limtong, Nitiyon, Kaewwich., Jindam., Am-In & Yongman., 2012

Some genera have been re-assigned from Pichia family; such as W. canadensis, W. ciferri, W. lynferdii, W. salvicola and W. subpelliculosa.

Wickerhamomyces is very divergent, and the three basal species; W. hampshirensis, W. pijperi and W. strasburgensis may be shown by future studies to be members of a sister genus.

== Uses ==
Yeasts belonging to the genera Candida, Pichia, and Wickerhamomyces have been found in Aedes and Anopheles genera of mosquitoes. Wickerhamomyces anomalus has also been isolated from the gonads of mosquitoes. It can then be used as a Glucanase to control the spread of plasmodium infection in malaria mosquitoes.

Wickerhamomyces anomalus has also been found in budbod (a Philippine rice cake, also known as marcha in India) and found in various other Asian countries. Such as Nepal and Tibet, where these alcoholic beverages (called Chhaang) are generated using a traditional starter called murcha. Murcha is prepared by using yeast and mold flora of wild herbs in cereal flours.

It has also been used as a biocontrol agent to prevent fungal contamination of grains and produce. Wickerhamomyces anomalus yeast is also used during the early stages of alcoholic fermentation, adding significantly to the character and quality of the wine. It helps in the sensory aroma of lily rice wine.

Wickerhamomyces silvicola has been found in the gum of the wild black cherry tree (Prunus serotina) and W. subpelliculosus in cucumber brine. Wickerhamomyces strasburgensis is found as slime flux on the Douglas fir. W. sylviae have been found in yeasts isolated from inside migratory birds, although it is unclear if the bird ate an insect that (then) contained the fungus.

The yeast is used in the fermentation of decoction of Saraca asoca bark to develop a suitable method for preparing its polyherbal formulation, of Asokarista. This is an Ayurvedic herbal medicine used to treat ‘female disorders’ or for menstrual disorder and female hormonal imbalances.
