= Sungouiella sharkensis =

Scientific classification
- Domain: Eukaryota
- Kingdom: Fungi
- Division: Ascomycota
- Class: Pichiomycetes
- Order: Serinales
- Family: Metschnikowiaceae
- Genus: Sungouiella
- Species: S. sharkensis

Binomial name
- Sungouiella sharkensis (Fell, M.H. Gut., Statzell & Scorzetti) Q.M. Wang, Yurkov, Boekhout & F.Y. Bai, 2024

Species of fungus

Sungouiella sharkensis is a yeast species first found in the Florida Everglades.
