= Coccidiascus =

Scientific classification
- Kingdom: Fungi
- Division: Ascomycota
- Class: Saccharomycetes
- Order: Saccharomycetales
- Family: Eremotheciaceae
- Genus: Coccidiascus; Chatton

Type species
- Coccidiascus legeri Chatton

Genus of fungi

Coccidiascus is a genus of fungi in the family Eremotheciaceae.
