= Starmerella =

Scientific classification
- Kingdom: Fungi
- Division: Ascomycota
- Class: Dipodascomycetes
- Order: Dipodascales
- Family: Trichomonascaceae
- Genus: Starmerella; C.A. Rosa & Lachance

Type species
- Starmerella bombicola C.A. Rosa & Lachance

Genus of fungi

Starmerella is a genus of fungi within the Saccharomycetales order. The relationship of this taxon to other taxa within the order is unknown (incertae sedis), and it has not yet been placed with certainty into any family. Although, the GBIF list the family as Phaffomycetaceae. Several members of the Starmerella clade are associated with flowers and flower-visiting insects like bees and bumblebees; these yeasts cope well with high sugar niches. Many strains (species) of the Starmerella clade, including Starmerella bombicola and Candida apicola are known to produce sophorolipids which are carbohydrate-based, amphiphilic biosurfactants.

The genus was circumscribed by Carlos Augusto Rosa and Marc-André Lachance in Int. J. Syst. Bacteriol. vol.48 (4) on page 1413 in 1998.

The genus name of Starmerella is in honour of William Thomas Starmer (b.1944), an American botanist and emeritus professor of biology in the College of Arts and Sciences at Syracuse University.

== Species ==
As accepted by Species Fungorum;

- Starmerella aceti W.G.P. Melo, P.B. Morais & Pagnocca (2019)
- Starmerella anomalae F.L. Hui & Y.C. Ren (2016)
- Starmerella apicola (Hajsig) C.A. Rosa & Lachance (2018)
- Starmerella apis (Lavie ex Uden & Vidal-Leir.) C.A. Rosa & Lachance (2018)
- Starmerella asiatica F.L. Hui & Y.C. Ren (2016)
- Starmerella bacillaris (Kroemer & Krumbholz) F.L. Duarte & Á. Fonseca (2012)
- Starmerella batistae (C.A. Rosa, R.P. Martins, E.M. Viana, Antonini & Lachance) C.A. Rosa & Lachance (2018)
- Starmerella bombi (Montrocher) C.A. Rosa & Lachance (2018)
- Starmerella bombicola C.A. Rosa & Lachance (1998)
- Starmerella camargoi A.R.O. Santos, P.B. Morais, Lachance & C.A. Rosa (2018)
- Starmerella cellae (Pimentel, Lachance & C.A. Rosa) C.A. Rosa & Lachance (2018)
- Starmerella davenportii (Stratford, C.J. Bond, S.A. James, I.N. Roberts & Steels) C.A. Rosa & Lachance (2018)
- Starmerella etchellsii (Lodder & Kreger-van Rij) C.A. Rosa & Lachance (2018)
- Starmerella floricola (Tokuoka, Ishit., Goto & Komag.) C.A. Rosa & Lachance (2018)
- Starmerella floris (C.A. Rosa, Pagnocca & Lachance) C.A. Rosa & Lachance (2018)
- Starmerella geochares (Van der Walt, Johannsen & Yarrow) C.A. Rosa & Lachance (2018)
- Starmerella gropengiesseri (F.C. Harrison) C.A. Rosa & Lachance (2018)
- Starmerella henanensis F.L. Hui & Y.C. Ren (2016)
- Starmerella ilheusensis A.R.O. Santos, Lachance & C.A. Rosa (2018)
- Starmerella khaoyaiensis Jindam., Limtong, Yongmanitchai, Tuntirungkij, Potacharoen, H. Kawas. & Nakase ex C.A. Rosa & Lachance (2018)
- Starmerella kuoi (Kurtzman) C.A. Rosa & Lachance (2018)
- Starmerella lactis-condensi (B.W. Hammer) C.A. Rosa & Lachance (2018)
- Starmerella litoralis A.R.O. Santos, M.A. Lachance & C.A. Rosa (2018)
- Starmerella magnoliae (Lodder & Kreger-van Rij) C.A. Rosa & Lachance (2018)
- Starmerella meliponinorum A.C.P. Teixeira, M.M. Marini, Lachance & C.A. Rosa (2003)
- Starmerella neotropicalis H.M. Daniel, C.A. Rosa, Thiago-Cal., P. Evrard & Lachance (2013)
- Starmerella opuntiae A.R.O. Santos, L.F.D. Freitas, P.B. Morais, Lachance & C.A. Rosa (2018)
- Starmerella potacharoeniae (Nakase, Jindam., Imanishi, Am-In, Ninomiya, H. Kawas. & Limtong) C.A. Rosa & Lachance (2018)
- Starmerella riodocensis (Pimentel, Lachance & C.A. Rosa) C.A. Rosa & Lachance (2018)
- Starmerella roubikii Lachance & C.A. Rosa (2018)
- Starmerella scarabaei F.L. Hui & Y.C. Ren (2016)
- Starmerella sirachaensis Limtong ex C.A. Rosa & Lachance (2018)
- Starmerella sorbosivorans (S.A. James, C.J. Bond & I.N. Roberts) C.A. Rosa & Lachance (2018)
- Starmerella stellata (Kroemer & Krumbholz) C.A. Rosa & Lachance (2018)
- Starmerella vaccinii (Tokuoka, Ishit., Goto & Komag.) C.A.Rosa & Lachance (2018)
- Starmerella vitae A.R.O. Santos, Lachance & C.A. Rosa (2018)
