= Ascobotryozyma =

Scientific classification
- Kingdom: Fungi
- Division: Ascomycota
- Class: Saccharomycetes
- Order: Saccharomycetales
- Family: incertae sedis
- Genus: Ascobotryozyma; J. Kerrigan, M.T. Sm. & J.D. Rogers

Type species
- Ascobotryozyma americana J. Kerrigan, M.T. Sm. & J.D. Rogers

Species
- A. americana A. cognata

Genus of fungi

Ascobotryozyma is a genus of fungi within the Saccharomycetales order. The relationship of this taxon to other taxa within the order is unknown (incertae sedis), and it has not yet been placed with certainty into any family.
