= Wickerhamomyces anomalus =

Scientific classification
- Kingdom: Fungi
- Division: Ascomycota
- Class: Saccharomycetes
- Order: Phaffomycetales
- Family: Wickerhamomycetaceae
- Genus: Wickerhamomyces
- Species: W. anomalus

Binomial name
- Wickerhamomyces anomalus (E.C. Hansen) Kurtzman, Robnett & Basehoar-Powers

Synonyms
- Pichia anomala

Species of fungus

Wickerhamomyces anomalus is a species of ascomycete and teleomorphic fungi of the genus Wickerhamomyces. It is used as a preventive (biocontrol agent) for undesirable fungi or mold, nevertheless it may spoil food in large quantities. It is used in wine making, airtight stored grain (preventing Aspergillus flavus aflatoxins), apples, and grapevines. Pichia anomala has been reclassified as Wickerhamomyces anomalus.

== Features ==
Wickerhamomyces anomalus has high osmotolerance and ferments sucrose, and assimilates raffinose. Does not exhibit crabtree effect but rather Pasteur effect.

=== Products ===
- ethanol under anaerobiosis
- acetate under respiratory and respirofermentative growth.
- ethyl acetate from glucose under oxygen limitation, also other small volatiles, e.g., ethyl propanoate, phenyl ethanol, and 2-phenylethyl acetate.
- glycerol, arabinitol, and trehalose under osmotic stress and oxygen limitation.
