= William T. Starmer =

American geneticist (born 1944)

William Thomas Starmer (born 1944) is an emeritus professor of biology in the College of Arts and Sciences at Syracuse University in Syracuse, New York. Starmer is known for his work on population genetics, specifically the ecological genetics of the interactions between cactus, yeast, and fruit flies (Drosophila). Species of Drosophila and yeast have been named in his honor.

== Education ==
Starmer earned his B.S. (1964, 1967) and PhD at the University of Arizona, where he worked under Alan B. Humphrey. His 1972 PhD thesis was titled "Quantitative Gene Action in Cucurbita Species". He briefly attended the Goethe-Institut in 1965.

== Career ==
Starmer joined Syracuse University in 1977. Prior to this appointment, he worked as a research microbiologist at the University of California, a research professor at the University of Arizona, and a resident associate at the Argonne National Laboratory. He has published more than 200 research articles.

== Awards ==
In 2011, Starmer was elected as Fellow at the American Association for the Advancement of Science.

In 1997, botanists Yuzo Yamada, Tetsuo Higashi, Susumu Ando and Kozaburo Mikata published Starmera which is a genus of fungi within the Phaffomycetaceae family and named in his honour. Then in 1998 C.A.Rosa & Lachance published Starmerella, a genus of fungi within the Saccharomycetales order.
