= Metschnikowia =

Scientific classification
- Kingdom: Fungi
- Division: Ascomycota
- Class: Saccharomycetes
- Order: Saccharomycetales
- Family: Metschnikowiaceae
- Genus: Metschnikowia; T. Kamienski

Genus of fungi

Metschnikowia is a genus of yeast in the family Metschnikowiaceae. Cells are usually spherical to ellipsoid. Asci are elongate and contain one or two needle shaped ascospores. Metschnikowia bicuspidata is the type species. Metschnikowia pulcherrima has been investigated for use in winemaking and as a substitute for Palm oil.
