= William Starmer =

William Starmer may refer to:

- William T. Starmer (born 1944), American geneticist and professor
- William Austin Starmer, American sheet music cover artist
