= Eremotheciaceae =

Scientific classification
- Kingdom: Fungi
- Division: Ascomycota
- Class: Saccharomycetes
- Order: Saccharomycetales
- Family: Eremotheciaceae; Kurtzman.

Type genus
- Eremothecium Borzí

Genera
- Eremothecium; Coccidiascus

Family of fungi

The Eremotheciaceae are a family of yeasts in the order Saccharomycetales. According to the 2007 Outline of Ascomycota, the family contains two genera, but the placement of the genus Coccidiascus is uncertain. Species in the family have widespread distributions, and are especially prevalent in tropical areas.
