= Helenozyma rhizophorensis =

Scientific classification
- Domain: Eukaryota
- Kingdom: Fungi
- Division: Ascomycota
- Class: Pichiomycetes
- Order: Serinales
- Family: Metschnikowiaceae
- Genus: Helenozyma
- Species: H. rhizophorensis

Binomial name
- Helenozyma rhizophorensis (Fell, M.H. Gut., Statzell & Scorzetti) Q.M. Wang, Yurkov, Boekhout & F.Y. Bai, 2024

Species of fungus

Helenozyma rhizophorensis is a yeast species first found in the Florida Everglades.
