= Phaffomyces =

Scientific classification
- Kingdom: Fungi
- Division: Ascomycota
- Class: Saccharomycetes
- Order: Phaffomycetales
- Family: Phaffomycetaceae
- Genus: Phaffomyces; Y. Yamada

Type species
- Phaffomyces opuntiae (Starmer, Phaff, M. Miranda, M.W. Mill. & J.S.F. Barker) Y. Yamada

Species
- See text

Genus of fungi

Phaffomyces is a genus of fungi within the Phaffomycetales order. It is placed within the Phaffomycetaceae fungi family.

The genus name of Phaffomyces is in honour of Herman Jan Phaff (1913–2001), who was a scientist who specialised in the ecology of yeast.

The genus was circumscribed by Yuzo Yamada in Bull. Fac. Agric. Shizuoka Univ. vol.47 on page 30 in 1997.

== Species ==
As accepted by GBIF;

- Phaffomyces antillensis (Starmer, Phaff, Tredick, M.Miranda & V.Aberdeen) Y.Yamada, H.Kawas., Nagats., Mikata & T.Seki
- Phaffomyces opuntiae (Starmer, Phaff, M.Miranda, M.W.Mill. & J.S.F.Barker) Y.Yamada
- Phaffomyces thermotolerans (Starmer, Phaff, M.Miranda, M.W.Mill. & J.S.F.Barker) Y.Yamada & Higashi
- Phaffomyces usticensis C.Carvalho, Settanni, J.P.Samp. & Moschetti
