= Candidozyma haemuli =

Scientific classification
- Kingdom: Fungi
- Division: Ascomycota
- Class: Pichiomycetes
- Order: Serinales
- Family: Metschnikowiaceae
- Genus: Candidozyma
- Species: C. haemuli

Binomial name
- Candidozyma haemuli (Uden & Kolip.) Q.M. Wang, Yurkov, Boekhout & F.Y. Bai, 2024

Synonyms
- Candida duobushaemulonii; Candida haemulonii var. vulnera; Torulopsis haemuli

Species of fungus

Candidozyma haemuli is a yeast fungal pathogen that is known to cause infections in humans. C. haemuli is an emerging opportunistic pathogen that is found in hospitals and healthcare settings. Infections are difficult to treat because the fungus has resistance to antifungal agents. Since its emergence, little research has been conducted on this fungus. However, in recent years, research has been conducted to help identify the various properties of C. haemuli.

== Taxonomy ==
The fungus was first classified as Torulopsis haemuli in 1962. In 1978, the fungus became classified as Candida haemulonii.

== Morphology ==
Oval cells are present at a microscopic level. The fungus has the ability to switch from a filamentous phenotype to a yeast phenotype given temperature differences. This allows the fungus to survive within different environments at different temperatures.

== Habitat ==
Since the fungus has yeast properties, it has the ability to survive in soil and water. The fungus has been present in various outbreaks around the globe, including in hospitals within patients where the fungus has increased resistance to antifungals. This indicates its ability to survive and reside in human bodies. As well, it is an indication it can survive on non-living surfaces. Due to the fungus's ability to switch phenotypes given the temperature, it is implied that the fungus can survive within a wide temperature range in order to adapt to the external environment and continue to survive.

== Geographical distribution and outbreaks ==
There have been an increased number of global outbreaks where this strain of fungus was found. The original locations of the fungus is reported to have been the Atlantic Ocean. Researchers noted that they found traces of the fungus on the skin of dolphins and the seawater of the coast of Portugal.

A study in 2001 reported that the fungus was associated with an epidemic in a laboratory maintained colony in the Czech Republic.

A study in 2015 reported how the fungus was found in patients in Brazilian hospitals. This study reported antifungal multi-resistant properties.

Recent studies around 2020 report C. haemuli as an opportunistic pathogen in hospitals across the United States.

The fungus has been reported in diverse regions around the world. This would corroborate how the species has properties that allow it to adapt to different temperatures in different environments because each of the mentioned regions have climates that are distinct from one another.

== Medical relevance ==
Amphotericin B, fluconazole, and itraconazole are antifungal agents that have been used against C. haemuli in immunocompromised patients. The fungus was reported to be resistant to these antifungal agents. In addition, the fungus is resistant to azoles and echinocandins, which are also antifungal drugs.

The fungus is reported to have a tendency to cause chronic lower extremity wounds. The fungus is also more likely to negatively impact diabetic patients. The fungus has been isolated from the nails of diabetic patients. It has also been associated with toe ulcers and renal failure.

A study delved into how the case fatality rate of C. haemuli is 83.33%. Immunological studies showed that the species stimulated genes involved in proinflammatory cytokine group, indicating the species can impact the inflammatory pathway.
