= Macrorhabdus =

Scientific classification
- Kingdom: Fungi
- Division: Ascomycota
- Class: Saccharomycetes
- Order: Saccharomycetales
- Family: incertae sedis
- Genus: Macrorhabdus; Tomasz., Logan, Snowden, Kurtzman & Phalen
- Species: M. ornithogaster

Binomial name
- Macrorhabdus ornithogaster Tomasz., Logan, Snowden, Kurtzman & Phalen

Genus of fungi

Macrorhabdus ornithogaster, also known by the common name avian gastric yeast, is an infectious fungus usually found in the digestive systems of birds, causing a number of health complications. Formerly believed to be a bacterium, it has been determined to be a yeast. It is the only species in the genus Macrorhabdus.

== Symptoms ==
The fungus affects a wide variety of bird species, from budgerigars to ostriches. Affected birds typically lose weight and die from malnourishment related complications, although in some cases death can be more sudden as a result of vomiting or choking. Detection is usually made through microscopic inspection of the bird's stool, although not all affected birds pass the fungus all the way through their digestive systems.

== Treatment ==
Birds are typically treated by being given amphotericin over a period of days; a regular dosage being required in order to eliminate the fungus. It can be challenging to remove infection from a flock completely due to reinfection and inconsistent treatment dosing (for example, medication given in communal water).
