= Starmerella bacillaris =

Scientific classification
- Kingdom: Fungi
- Division: Ascomycota
- Class: Dipodascomycetes
- Order: Dipodascales
- Family: Trichomonascaceae
- Genus: Starmerella
- Species: S. bacillaris

Binomial name
- Starmerella bacillaris (Kroemer & Krumbholz) F.L. Duarte & A. Fonseca, 2012

Species of fungus

Starmerella bacillaris is a yeast species that is osmotolerant, psychrotolerant and ferments sweet botrytized wines. Its type strain is 10-372^{T} (=CBS 9494^{T} =NCAIM Y016667^{T}).
