= Hyphopichia =

Scientific classification
- Kingdom: Fungi
- Division: Ascomycota
- Class: Saccharomycetes
- Order: Saccharomycetales
- Family: Debaryomycetaceae
- Genus: Hyphopichia von Arx & van der Walt

Type species
- Hyphopichia burtonii (Boidin, Pignal, Lehodey, Vey & Abadie) Arx & Van der Walt

Species
- H. amylophila H. burtonii H. heimii H. rhodanensis

Genus of fungi

Hyphopichia is a genus of fungi within the Serinales order. The relationship of this taxon to other taxa within the order is unknown (incertae sedis), and it has not yet been placed with certainty into any family.
