= Pichia membranifaciens =

Scientific classification
- Kingdom: Fungi
- Division: Ascomycota
- Class: Pichiomycetes
- Order: Pichiales
- Family: Pichiaceae
- Genus: Pichia
- Species: P. membranifaciens

Binomial name
- Pichia membranifaciens (E.C. Hansen) E.C. Hansen, (1904)

Synonyms
- Debaryomyces membranifaciens (E.C. Hansen) Y. Otani; Saccharomyces membranifaciens E.C. Hansen [as 'membranaefaciens'], (1888)

Species of fungus

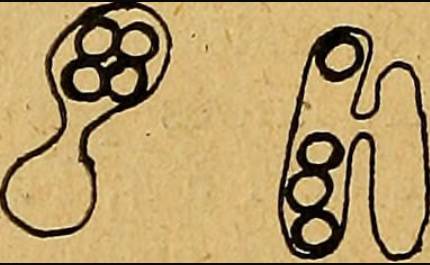
Pichia membranaefaciens on page 485 of Comptes rendus des séances de la Société de biologie et de ses filiales (1849)

Pichia membranifaciens is a species of yeast.
