= Cletus P. Kurtzman =

American mycologist (1938–2017)

- Born: July 19, 1938; Mansfield, Ohio
- Died: November 27, 2017 (aged 79)
- Education: Ohio University (Bachelors) Purdue (Masters) West Virginia University (PhD)
- Known for: Taxonomy of yeasts, Saccromycotina
- Spouse: Mary Ann Dombrink (deceased)
- Children: 3
- Awards: fellow of American Academy of Microbiology (1981) U.S. Federation for Culture Collections/American Society for Microbiology J. Roger Porter Award (1990) Inductee to the ARS Science Hall of Fame (2016)
- Scientific career
- Fields: Mycology, Microbiology
- Workplaces: USDA, Peoria, IL
- Author abbrev. (botany): Kurtzman

Cletus P. Kurtzman (July 19, 1938 – November 27, 2017) was an American mycologist who is known for his contributions to yeast taxonomy and is regarded as "the father of modern yeast taxonomy"(Boekhout, T 2019).

Many of his findings uncovered unknown diversity within this group of fungi. Among his many accomplishments was the early adoption of DNA barcodes for fungal taxonomic identification that has resulted in barcodes for every known ascomycete yeast, providing immeasurable value to field of yeast studies.

== Early years and education ==
Kurtzman was born in Mansfield, Ohio to Paul and Marjorie (Gartner) Kurtzman. He had one sister. He married Mary Ann Dombrink in 1962, whom he had three children with. From 1962 to 1964 Kurtzman served in the U.S. Army where he rose to the rank of 2nd lieutenant. He received his bachelor of science degree in botany from the Ohio University and a masters in plant pathology at Purdue in 1962. He went on to receive his PhD in microbiology and mycology 1967 at West Virginia University.

== Career ==
Kurtzman worked his entire scientific career (1967–2017) at the National Center for Agricultural Utilization Research, Northern Regional Research Center of United States Department of Agriculture in Peoria, Illinois. Among his many accomplishments, he helped pioneer techniques for defining ascomycete yeasts along multiple concepts using DNA-DNA recombination, phenotype and morphology before the advent of gene sequencing. Once gene sequencing became possible he would later determine that DNA recombination was time consuming and only useful for determining closely related species of yeasts. Kurtzman would redefine many clades within the Saccharomycotina group based on genetic similarity and helped formulate methods and tools that are currently used to help classify new species discovered within this group.

He held several leading positions including research leader and curator within the USDA, which during that time he defined many new species and genera of yeasts with which he named in honor of many of his colleagues, much to the chagrin of some taxonomists. Some of his best known accomplishments involved expanding our knowledge of the Saccharomycotina and the Saccharomyces and Candida genera. Kurtzman's diversity work resulted in him describing 85 species, 21 genera, and five families.

Before genetic sequencing was possible there was some debate as to whether the yeasts represented an early form of fungi or ones that are effectively simplified forms of later evolved clades. Their relationship to filamentous fungi was not completely understood and sometimes overlooked. Once genetic sequencing was possible, Kurtzman put the issue to rest showing that they do indeed share a close relationship with filamentous fungi. Kurtzman's commitment and early use of molecular phylogeny to study yeasts lead to his identification of multiple RNA regions that are useful for identifying yeasts down to the species level and resolving higher classifications. His use of the D1/D2 domains of the large sub-unit of ribosomal DNA turned out to be a major breakthrough for the study of yeasts and one of his accomplishments he is best known for. His lab became well known and trusted for its high quality analyses. "His later writings show an immense knowledge of the properties of various genes in terms of evolutionary rates, concordance with other genes, or the best primers or cycling conditions to obtain impeccable amplifications. The designation NRRL on a sequence deposit continues to be a certificate of quality" (Lachance, MA 2018).

Kurtzman was also fascinated with application of the many yeasts that he studied, including uses in biotechnology and clinical diagnostics. He is recognized for his discovery of the D-xylose and L-arabinose fermenting yeasts and their applications in the biofuels industry along with degradation of Fusarium mycotoxins by Blastobotrys spp, and the sorolipid-producing yeasts useful as surfactants.

Kurtzman was active in the community and is remembered for his sense of humor and willingness to entertain new ideas. He regularly reviewed fellow scientists papers and was noted for his thorough yet kind reviews. He actively participated at yeast conferences and broader mycology biodiversity meetings. He authored or coauthored 350 publications which have been cited over 23,000 times. He also contributed in editions of The yeasts: a taxonomic study, a guide to all documented yeasts. He regularly mentored younger scientists.
