= Starmera =

Scientific classification
- Kingdom: Fungi
- Division: Ascomycota
- Class: Saccharomycetes
- Order: Phaffomycetales
- Family: Phaffomycetaceae
- Genus: Starmera; Y. Yamada, Higashi, S. Ando & Mikata

Type species
- Starmera amethionina (Starmer, Phaff, M. Miranda & M.W. Mill.) Y. Yamada, Higashi, S. Ando & Mikata

Genus of fungi

Starmera is a genus of fungi within the Phaffomycetales order. It is placed within the Phaffomycetaceae family.

Starmera is often associated with necrotic lesions in cacti.

The genus was circumscribed by Yuzo Yamada, Tetsuo Higashi, Susumu Ando and Kozaburo Mikata in Bull. Fac. Agric. Shizuoka Univ. vol.47 on page 31 in 1997.

The genus name of Starmera is in honour of William Thomas Starmer (b.1944), an American botanist and emeritus professor of biology in the College of Arts and Sciences at Syracuse University.

== Species ==
As accepted by Species Fungorum;

- Starmera amethionina (Starmer, Phaff, M. Miranda & M.W. Mill.) Y. Yamada, Higashi, S. Ando & Mikata (1997)
- Starmera caribaea (Phaff, Starmer, Lachance, V. Aberdeen & Tredick) Y. Yamada, H. Kawas., Nagats., Mikata & T. Seki (1999)
- Starmera dryadoides (D.B. Scott & Van der Walt) Kurtzman, Robnett & Bas.-Powers (2008)
- Starmera foglemanii J.D. Moreira, A.R.O. Santos, Lachance & C.A. Rosa (2020)
- Starmera ilhagrandensis C.G. Morais, A.R.O. Santos, Lachance & C.A. Rosa (2020)
- Starmera pachycereana (Starmer, Phaff, M. Miranda & M.W. Mill.) Kurtzman, Robnett & Bas.-Powers (2008)
- Starmera pilosocereana L.F.D. Freitas, Lachance & C.A. Rosa (2015)
- Starmera quercuum (Phaff & E.P. Knapp) Kurtzman, Robnett & Bas.-Powers (2008)
- Starmera stellimalicola (M. Suzuki, Nakase & Komag.) M.A. Lachance & C.A. Rosa (2015)
