= Phenylethanol =

Phenylethanol may refer to:

- 1-Phenylethanol
- 2-Phenylethanol (phenethyl alcohol)
