= Blastoconidium =

Product of asexual budding reproduction in fungi

A blastoconidium (plural blastoconidia) is an asexual holoblastic conidia formed through the blowing out or budding process of a yeast cell, which is a type of asexual reproduction that results in a bud arising from a parent cell. The production of a blastoconidium can occur along a true hyphae, pseudohyphae, or a singular yeast cell. The word "conidia" comes from the Greek word konis and eidos, konis meaning dust and eidos meaning like. The term "bud" comes from the Greek word blastos, which means bud. Yeasts such as Candida albicans and Cryptococcus neoformans produce these budded cells known as blastoconidia.

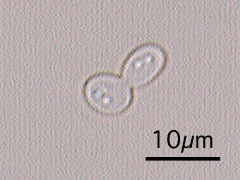
Candida albicans budding to produce a blastoconidium

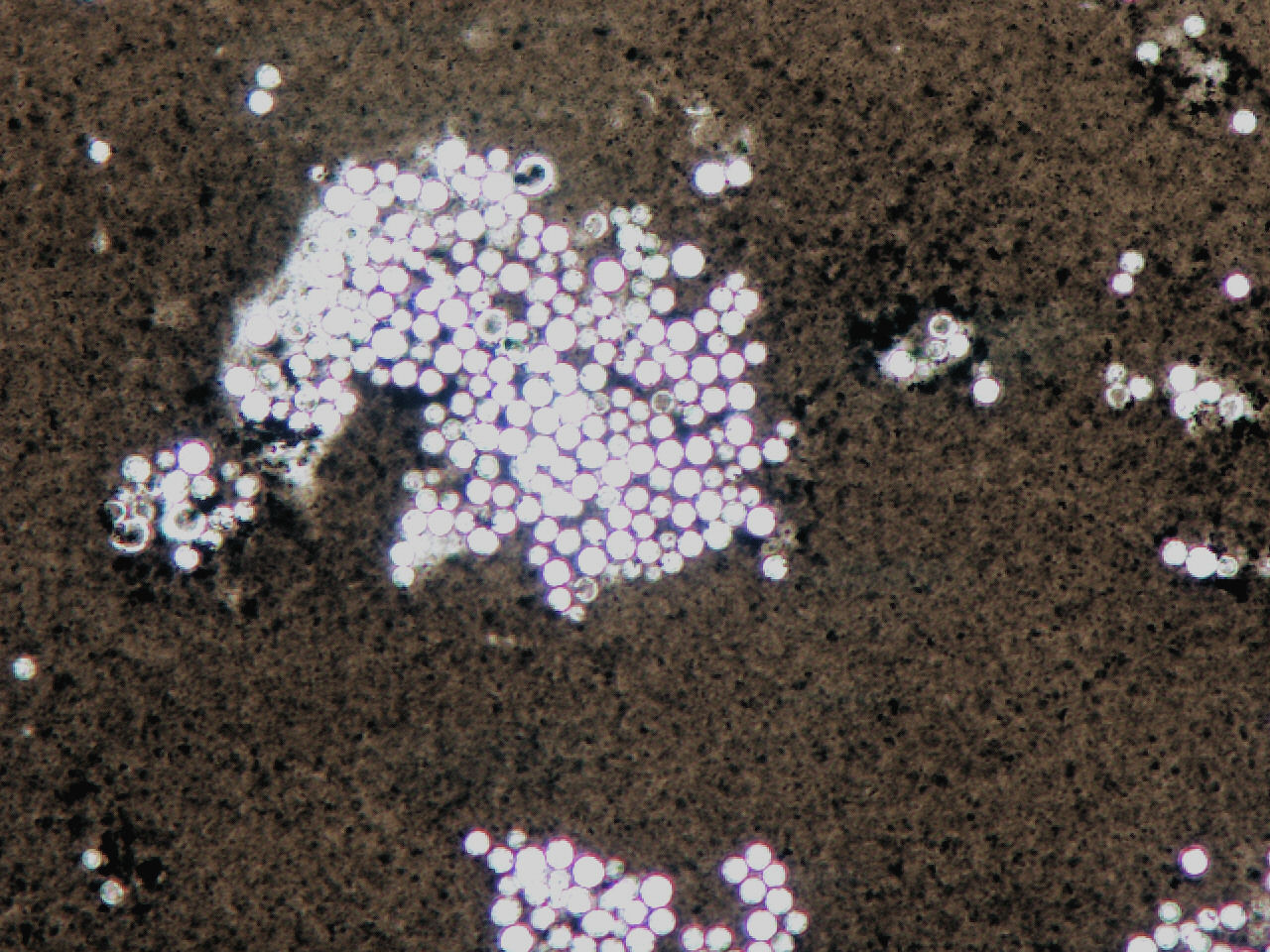
Cryptococcus neoformans yeast cells

== Formation of a blastoconidium ==
The mitotic budding process through which blastoconidia are formed consists of three steps. The first step is bud emergence, in which the outer cell wall of the parental yeast thins. At the same time, there is growth of new cell wall and plasma membrane components. The next step is bud growth, a process that is regulated by the synthesis of new cellular components and turgor pressure created by the parental yeast cell. While this bud is growing, mitosis of the parental nucleus is taking place. Once there are two identical nuclei, one will migrate to the forming blastoconidium. The last step is conidium separation, in which a ring of chitin forms between the blastoconidium and the parental yeast cell; this ring of chitin will eventually form the septum. Now that these two cells are separated, a bud scar forms on the parental yeast cell. These bud scars can be detected due to the presence of more chitin in these areas, and this is also a way to detect how many times a yeast cell has undergone the budding process. Sometimes, the process of forming a blastoconidium does not end in the complete separation from the parental yeast cell. When this occurs, a pseudohypha is formed, a filamentous chain of connected blastoconidia.

== Blastoconidium virulence ==
Fungal species that form blastoconidia are ubiquitous and commensal in nature, but can become opportunistic pathogens when the blastoconidia convert into the hyphal form through morphogenesis. The blastoconidia form is a part of the normal flora, while the hyphal form can be considered pathogenic and cause infection.

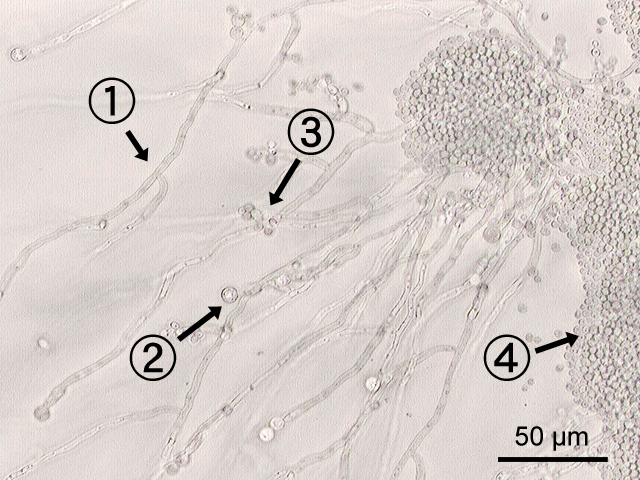
Candida albicans pseudohyphae located at number 1

For example, Candida albicans exists in different forms depending on certain environmental conditions, and the dimorphic nature of Candida albicans is a major virulence factor. The conditions at which this organism exists as a yeast (commensal) occur when the temperature is less than 30°C, pH is less than 7, serum is absent, and nitrogen is abundant. The conditions at which this organism occurs as hyphae (pathogenic) are when the temperature is 37°C, pH is greater than 7, serum is present, and nitrogen is limiting. The blastoconidia yeast is less virulent to humans because the conditions required for growth do not occur in humans, but the hyphal form is virulent because it thrives in the environment a human provides as a host. So, when Candida albicans converts to the hyphal form, it will cause more infections.

The blastoconidia form is also less virulent than the hyphal form based on the immune response dictated in a host. Through a study conducted on Candida albicans, it was concluded that the blastoconidia produced a different cytokine profile that resulted in more of a host immune response. The immune response that was activated will eliminate the blastoconidia form more efficiently from the host, and indicated that humans have more of a protective effect against an infection caused by Candida albicans blastoconidia.

Unfortunately, the blastoconidia of Candida albicans enhances attachment to a host, which increases the virulence of the blastoconidia form. This happens because blastoconidia produce adhesin proteins that facilitate and enable the yeast to attach to host cells.
