= Ascoideaceae =

Ascoideaceae Temporal range: Palaeogene–present

Scientific classification
- Kingdom: Fungi
- Division: Ascomycota
- Class: Saccharomycetes
- Order: Saccharomycetales
- Family: Ascoideaceae; J.Schröt. (1894)

Type genus
- Ascoidea Bref. (1891)

Type species
- Ascoidea rubescens Bref. (1891)

Species
- Ascoidea asiatica; Ascoidea corymbosa; Ascoidea rubescens; Ascoidea tarda; Alloascoidea africana; Alloascoidea hylecoeti

Family of fungi

The Ascoideaceae are a family of yeasts in the order Saccharomycetales. It contains the two genera Ascoidea and Alloascoidea. Species in the family have a widespread distribution, and typically grow in beetle galleries in dead wood.
