= Saccharomycopsidaceae =

Scientific classification
- Kingdom: Fungi
- Division: Ascomycota
- Class: Saccharomycetes
- Order: Saccharomycetales
- Family: Saccharomycopsidaceae; Arx & Van der Walt (1987)

Type genus
- Saccharomycopsis Schiønn. (1903)

Genera
- Ambrosiozyma; Arthroascus; Saccharomycopsis

Family of fungi

The Saccharomycopsidaceae are a family of yeasts in the order Saccharomycetales. According to the 2007 Outline of Ascomycota, the family contains three genera, although the placement of the genus Ambrosiozyma is uncertain. Species in this poorly known family have a widespread distribution.
