= Cephaloascus =

Scientific classification
- Kingdom: Fungi
- Division: Ascomycota
- Class: Pichiomycetes
- Order: Serinales
- Family: Cephaloascaceae L.R.Batra (1973)
- Genus: Cephaloascus Hanawa (1920)

Type species
- Cephaloascus fragrans Hanawa (1920)

Family of fungi

The Cephaloascaceae are a family of yeasts in the order Saccharomycetales. A monotypic taxon, it contains the single genus Cephaloascus. Species in the family are distributed in Canada, Japan, and the United Kingdom, where they grow on coniferous wood or other fungi, or are associated with insects.
