= Wickerhamomycetaceae =

Scientific classification
- Kingdom: Fungi
- Division: Ascomycota
- Class: Saccharomycetes
- Order: Phaffomycetales
- Family: Wickerhamomycetaceae; Kurtzman, Robnett & Bas.-Powers, 2008

Genera
- See text

Family of fungi

The Wickerhamomycetaceae are a family of yeasts in the order Phaffomycetales that reproduce by budding. Species in the family have a widespread distribution.

Genus Wickerhamomyces used to be placed within Phaffomycetaceae family until 2008, when it was separated and placed within its own order, Wickerhamomycetaceae.

Various Wickerhamomyces species have been used in biotechnological applications, such as environmental biotechnology, food and beverage industries (including winemaking), biofuel, medicine, and agriculture.

== Description ==
The fungi has asexual reproduction and that budding is multilateral on a narrow base. The cells are spherical, ovoid, or elongate in shape. Pseudohyphae and true hyphae (a long, branching, filamentous structure) are produced by some species. In sexual reproduction, it is found that the asci (spore bearing cell) may be unconjugated or show conjugation between a cell and its bud or between independent cells. Some species are heterothallic (species have sexes that reside in different individuals). Asci may be persistent or deliquescent and form one to four ascospores that may be hat-shaped or spherical with an equatorial ledge.

It can be found in soils, on plant material (such as phylloplane of rice,) and also as an opportunistic pathogen of humans and animals.

== Genera ==
According to GBIF, and the United States Department of Agriculture and the Agricultural Research Service;

- Barnettozyma C.P.Kurtzman, C.J.Robnett & E.Basehoar-Powers, 2008 (26)
- Wickerhamomyces Kurtzman, Robnett & Bas.-Powers, 2008 (113)

Figures in brackets are approx. how many species per genus.

Wickerhamomyces anomalus is normally found on plants, but has been found in sugar, dry salted beans, sauerkraut and in cucumber brines.

== Other sources ==
- Kurtzman, C. P., C. J. Robnett, and E. Basehoar-Powers. 2008. Phylogenetic relationships among species of Pichia, Issatchenkia and Williopsis determined from multigene sequence analysis, and the proposal of Barnettozyma gen. nov., Lindnera gen. nov. and Wickerhamomyces gen. nov. FEMS Yeast Res 8:939-54.
