= Metschnikowiaceae =

Scientific classification
- Kingdom: Fungi
- Division: Ascomycota
- Class: Saccharomycetes
- Order: Saccharomycetales
- Family: Metschnikowiaceae; T.Kamienski (1900)

Type genus
- Metschnikowia T.Kamienski ex Doweld (2013)

Genera
- See text

Family of fungi

The Metschnikowiaceae are a family of yeasts in the order Saccharomycetales that reproduce by budding. The family comprises sixteen genera including the type genus Metschnikowia, which is commonly found in floral nectar and dispersed by pollinators on all continents except Antarctica. Originally proposed in 1900 but not validly published until 2013, the family has undergone significant taxonomic revision based on genome-scale studies, leading to the establishment of thirteen new genera in 2024 to better reflect evolutionary relationships. Members are characterized by multilateral budding, often elongated asci, and narrow thread-like ascospores, and they inhabit diverse environments including marine settings, decaying plant material, and especially flower nectar where they can influence pollinator behavior by altering nectar chemistry.

== Taxonomy ==
The yeast family Metschnikowiaceae is typified by the genus Metschnikowia. The name itself goes back to Franciszek Kamieński, who used "Metschnikowiaceae" in 1900, but that publication did not meet the requirements for valid publication under the International Code of Nomenclature for algae, fungi, and plants (it lacked an acceptable description or diagnosis, so it is treated as invalid under Art. 38.1(a) of the Shenzhen Code). The family was later validly established by Alexander Doweld in 2013.

In genome-informed classifications Metschnikowiaceae is placed in the order Serinales (class Pichiomycetes). Serinales itself was introduced in a genome-scale revision of higher ranks in the budding-yeast subphylum Saccharomycotina. In that treatment, Metschnikowiaceae is the type family of Serinales (alongside Cephaloascaceae and Debaryomycetaceae), and the order corresponds to a lineage of yeasts with an altered genetic-code trait: the codon CUG is translated as serine rather than leucine. The family has traditionally been centred on genera that form a sexual state (a teleomorph) with asci and ascospores, especially Metschnikowia, Clavispora and Hyphopichia. Many related species, however, are only known from asexual budding and were long treated as Candida, a catch-all genus for yeasts lacking distinctive morphological characters. Later molecular work showed that Candida in this broad sense is polyphyletic (i.e., it does not represent a single natural lineage), with species scattered across multiple yeast families.

In a 2024 phylogenomic study sampling genomes from across the family, Liu and colleagues reconstructed relationships within Metschnikowiaceae using a genome-scale tree inferred from hundreds of single-copy genes. Their analyses recovered numerous well-supported lineages and indicated that some long-used genera are too broad for the evolutionary patterns now resolved from genomes. In that framework, Danielozyma and Hyphopichia were placed within Metschnikowiaceae, and Clavispora, Hyphopichia and Metschnikowia (as then circumscribed) included deeply divergent lineages. For Clavispora, the authors recommended restricting the genus to the clade containing its type species, Clavispora lusitaniae, rather than continuing to apply the name to unrelated lineages.

To reduce the number of mismatched generic names inherited from the old Candida concept, the same study proposed thirteen new genera in Metschnikowiaceae and introduced many new combinations. Candida auris and its close relatives in the Candida auris–Candida haemuli clade were transferred to the new genus Candidozyma, while the neighbouring Candida tolerans lineage was separated as Osmozyma. Other clades recognised as distinct genera include Australozyma, Sungouiella, Wilhelminamyces, Gabaldonia, Tanozyma, Danielia, Gaillardinia, Helenozyma, Hermanozyma, Isabelozyma and Soucietia. The authors treated these changes as a step towards aligning genus names with phylogeny, while noting that parts of the large Metschnikowia lineage remain genetically diverse and may be revised further as additional taxa and genomes become available.

== Description ==
In Doweld's circumscription, members of Metschnikowiaceae are yeasts that reproduce vegetatively by multilateral budding and may form a distinct but sparsely septate mycelium; their asci develop on short lateral branches and are often elongate (sometimes curved or club-shaped), while the ascospores are typically narrow and thread-like and may bear filamentous appendages. Fermentation is usually negative, and reported habitats include marine settings and decaying plant tissues; some species occur in floral nectar and are dispersed by insects.

Many species in the type genus Metschnikowia are frequent inhabitants of floral nectar and are commonly moved between flowers by pollinators and other flower-visiting insects; reports summarised in a 2022 review place Metschnikowia nectar yeasts on every continent except Antarctica. Their growth in nectar can ferment sugars and produce volatile organic compounds, changing nectar chemistry and scent in ways that can influence insect foraging behaviour.

== Genera ==
- Australozyma Q.M.Wang, Yurkov, Boekhout & F.Y.Bai (2024)
- Candidozyma Q.M.Wang, Yurkov, Boekhout & F.Y.Bai (2024)
- Clavispora Rodr.Mir. (1979)
- Danielia Q.M.Wang, Yurkov, Boekhout & F.Y.Bai (2024)
- Gabaldonia Q.M.Wang, Yurkov, Boekhout & F.Y.Bai (2024)
- Gaillardinia Q.M.Wang, Yurkov, Boekhout & F.Y.Bai (2024)
- Helenozyma Q.M.Wang, Yurkov, Boekhout & F.Y.Bai (2024)
- Hermanozyma Q.M.Wang, Yurkov, Boekhout & F.Y.Bai (2024)
- Isabelozyma Q.M.Wang, Yurkov, Boekhout & F.Y.Bai (2024)
- Metschnikowia T.Kamienski (1900)
- Metschnikowiella A.G.Henckel (1913)
- Osmozyma Q.M.Wang, Yurkov, Boekhout & F.Y.Bai (2024)
- Soucietia Q.M.Wang, Yurkov, Boekhout & F.Y.Bai (2024)
- Sungouiella Q.M.Wang, Yurkov, Boekhout & F.Y.Bai (2024)
- Tanozyma Q.M.Wang, Yurkov, Boekhout & F.Y.Bai (2024)
- Wilhelminamyces Q.M.Wang, Yurkov, Boekhout & F.Y.Bai (2024)
