= Phaffomycetaceae =

Scientific classification
- Kingdom: Fungi
- Division: Ascomycota
- Class: Saccharomycetes
- Order: Phaffomycetales
- Family: Phaffomycetaceae; Y. Yamada, H. Kawas., Nagats., Mikata & Tats. Seki, 1999

Genera
- See text

Family of fungi

The Phaffomycetaceae are a family of yeasts in the order Phaffomycetales that reproduce by budding. Species in the family have a widespread distribution.

The family are named after Phaffomyces.

It is found to be linked to Equine grass sickness (EGS) via pasture mycotoxicosis, which comprises a very large and diverse population of fungi. It is found in silage, including lactic acid bacteria, yeasts and molds. It is found in fermented Ethiopian honey wine, Tej', and can affect bagasse (the waste product) of sugarcane, with other yeast fungi.

== Genera ==
According to GBIF;

- Cyberlindnera Minter, 2009 (79)
- Komagataella Y.Yamada, M.Matsuda, K.Maeda, C.Sakakibara & K.Mikata, 1995
- Starmera Y.Yamada, Higashi, S.Ando & Mikata (22)
- Zygowilliopsis

Figures in brackets are approx. how many species per genus.

Genus Wickerhamomyces used to be placed within Phaffomycetaceae, until 2008 when it was separated and placed within its own order Wickerhamomycetaceae.

Assignment of Komagataella into this family (or the broader order) is apparently inappropriate from a phylogenetic standpoint.

== Other sources ==
- Kurtzman, C. P., C. J. Robnett, and E. Basehoar-Powers. 2008. Phylogenetic relationships among species of Pichia, Issatchenkia and Williopsis determined from multigene sequence analysis, and the proposal of Barnettozyma gen. nov., Lindnera gen. nov. and Wickerhamomyces gen. nov. FEMS Yeast Res 8:939-54.
