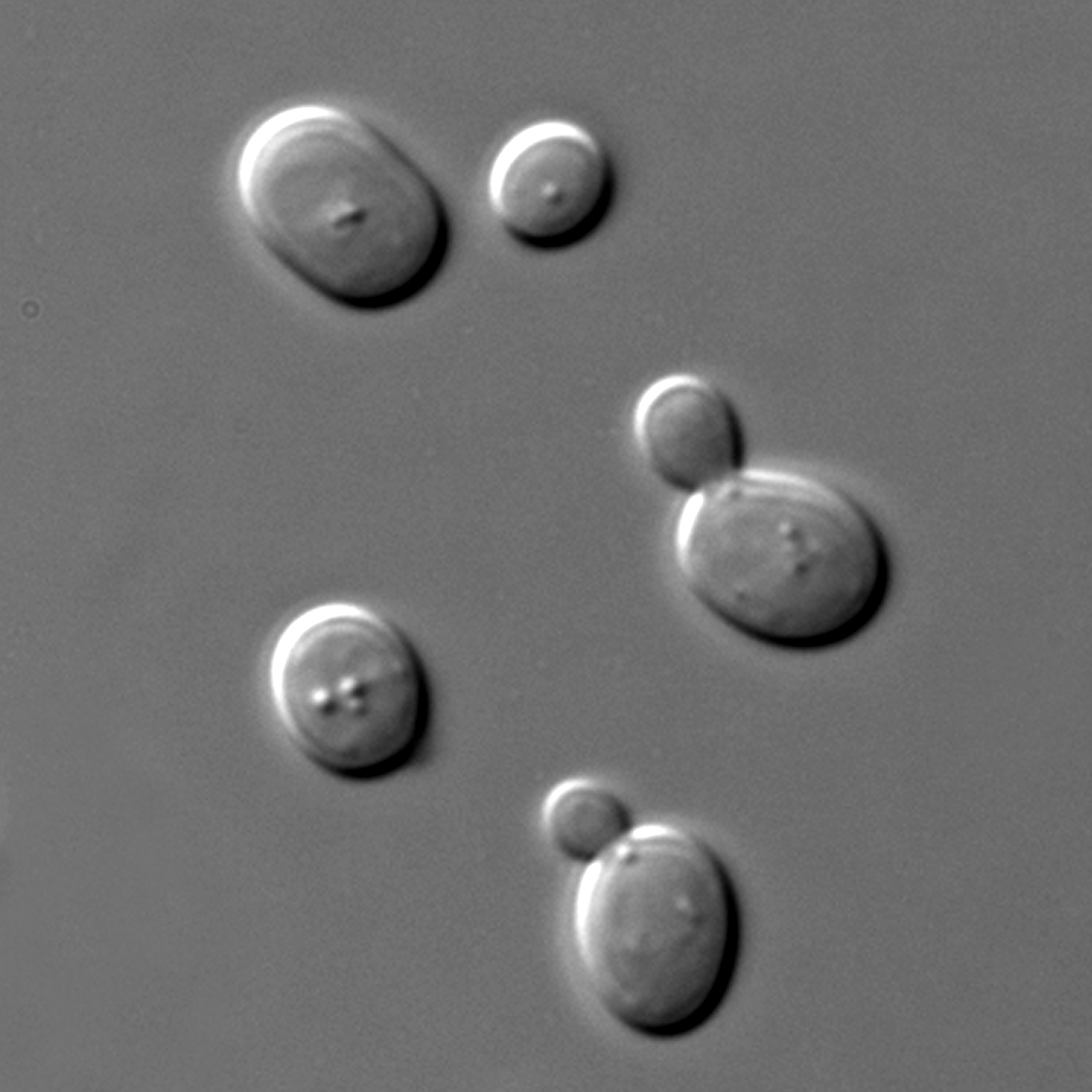
- Saccharomyces cerevisiae under DIC microscopy

Scientific classification
- Kingdom: Fungi
- Division: Ascomycota
- Class: Saccharomycetes
- Subclass: Saccharomycetidae
- Order: Saccharomycetales; Kudryatsev (1960)

Families
- Endomycetaceae; Saccharomycetaceae

= Saccharomycetales =

Order of fungi

Saccharomycetales belongs to the kingdom of Fungi and the division Ascomycota. It is the only order in the class Saccharomycetes. There are currently 2 families recognized as belonging to Saccharomycetales.

The order has undergone a process of progressive reduction as overly-divergent taxa are moved out. As of 2015 it included 13 families, the other 11 being Ascoideaceae, Cephaloascaceae, Debaryomycetaceae, Dipodascaceae, Lipomycetaceae, Metschnikowiaceae, Phaffomycetaceae, Pichiaceae, Saccharomycopsidaceae, Saccharomycodaceae, Trichomonascaceae. GBIF also includes Alloascoideaceae (with 5 genera), Eremotheciaceae (16) Trigonopsidaceae (with 36) and Wickerhamomycetaceae (with 141 genera).

== Genera incertae sedis ==
According to The Mycota, genera included in the order, but of uncertain taxonomic position (incertae sedis) include Ascobotryozyma J.Kerrigan, M.T.Smith & J.D.Rogers, 2001, Babjeviella, Botryozyma, Candida pro parte, Citeromyces, Coccidiascus, Komagataella, Kuraishia, Macrorhabdus Tomaszewski, Logan, Snowden, Kurtzman & Phalen, 2003 (2), Nadsonia Syd. & P.Syd. 1912, Nakazawaea, Pachysolen, Peterozyma, Schizoblastosporidon Ciferri, 1930, Sporopachydermia, and Trigonopsis.

GBIF also lists; Actonia C.W.Dodge, 1935, Aphidomyces Brain, 1923 (5), Ascotrichosporon, Azymocandida, Bacillopsis Petschenko, 1908, Berkhoutia, Blastodendrion, Cicadomyces K.Sulc, 1911, Dabaryomyces Klöcker, 1909, Deakozyma C.P.Kurtzman & C.J.Robnett, 2014 (3), Diutina Khunnamwong, Lertwattanasakul, Jindam., Limtong & Lachance, 2015 (24), Dolichoascus Thibaut & Ansel, 1970, Enantiothamnus Verona, 1933, Endomycodes Delitsch, 1943, Entelexis Walt & E.Johannsen, 1973, Ephebella Itzigsohn, 1857, Eutorulopsis Cif., Fragosia A.Caballero, 1928, Limtongella, Menezesia Torrend, 1913, Metahyphopichia, Middelhovenomyces Kurtzman & Robnett, 2014 (4), Mycotorula, Oleina Van Tieghem, 1887, Parendomyces Queyrat & Laroche, Pseudomycoderma H.Will, 1916, Psyllidomyces P.Buchner, 1912, Sachsia Bay, 1894, Saturnospora Z.W.Liu & C.P.Kurtzman, 1991, Starmerella C.A.Rosa & Lachance (103), Suhomyces M.Blackw. & Kurtzman, 2016 (60), Syringospora Quinq., Teunomyces Kurtzman & M.Blackw., 2016 (22), Thailandia, Torulopsis Berl., 1894 (26), and Tyridiomyces W.A.Wheeler, 1907.

Figures in brackets are approx. how many species per genus.
