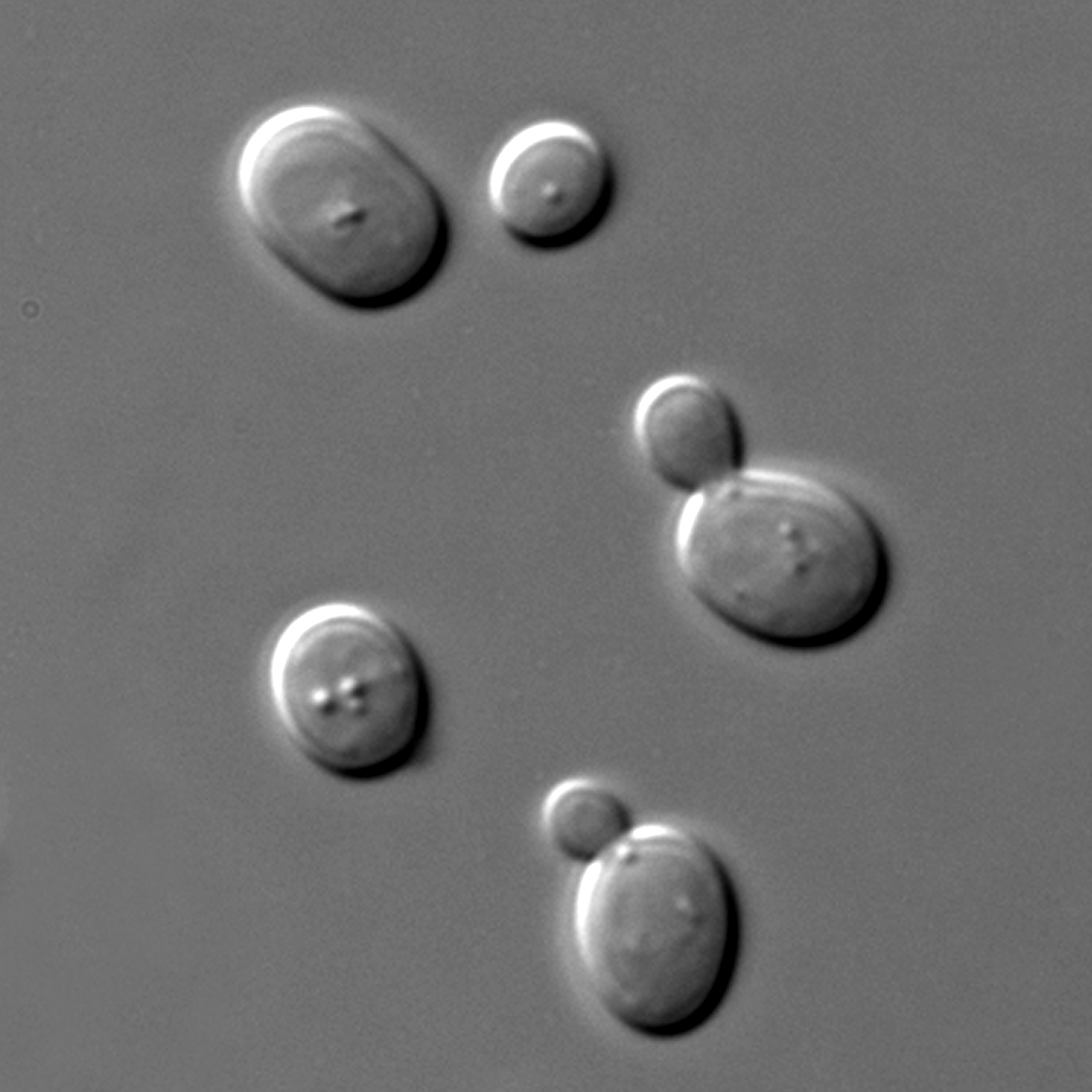
- Saccharomyces cerevisiae under DIC microscopy

Scientific classification
- Kingdom: Fungi
- Division: Ascomycota
- Subdivision: Saccharomycotina
- Class: Saccharomycetes; O.E. Erikss. & Winka 1997

Orders
- Ascoideales; Phaffomycetales; Saccharomycodales; Saccharomycetales

= Saccharomycetes =

Class of fungi

Saccharomycetes belongs to the Ascomycota division of the kingdom Fungi. It is the only class in the subdivision Saccharomycotina, the budding yeasts. Saccharomycetes contains a single order, Saccharomycetales, making the class monotypic.

Saccharomycetes are known for being able to comprise a monophyletic lineage with a single order of about 1,000 known species. These yeasts live as decomposers, feeding on dead and decaying wood, leaves, litter, and other organic matter. According to Suh et al. (2006), "yeasts are responsible for important industrial and biotechnological processes, including baking, brewing and synthesis of recombinant proteins," with Saccharomycetes being model organisms in research. Asia is likely to be the origin of the source.

Phylogeny and 2023 nomenclature

- - Ascoideales
    - Ascoideaceae Engl. 1892
    - Saccharomycopsidaceae Arx & Van der Walt 1987
- - - Phaffomycetales
      - Wickerhamomycetaceae Kurtzman, Robnett & Bas.-Powers 2008
      - Phaffomycetaceae Yamada et al. 1999
  - - Saccharomycodales
      Saccharomycodaceae Kudrjanzev 1960
    - Saccharomycetales
      - Endomycetaceae Schröter 1893
      - Saccharomycetaceae Winter 1881
