= Kluyveromyces dobzhanskii =

Scientific classification
- Kingdom: Fungi
- Division: Ascomycota
- Class: Saccharomycetes
- Order: Saccharomycetales
- Family: Saccharomycetaceae
- Genus: Kluyveromyces
- Species: K. dobzhanskii

Binomial name
- Kluyveromyces dobzhanskii (Shehata, Mrak & Phaff) Van der Walt, 1971

Synonyms
- Saccharomyces dobzhanskii; Dekkeromyces dobzhanskii; Guilliermondella dobzhanskii; Zygofabospora dobzhanskii; Kluyveromyces marxianus var. dobzhanskii

Species of fungus

Kluyveromyces dobhanskii is a species of Kluyveromyces fungus existing as a yeast.

== Taxonomy ==
Upon discovery, K. dobzhanskii was placed into the genus Saccharomyces. A 1971 reorganization of certain fungal taxa placed K. dobzhanskii into the genus Kluyveromyces, where it has remained since. It is named after Russian-American mycologist Theodosius Dobzhansky.

== Growth and morphology ==
After three days of growth on YM agar, cells of K. dobzhanskii have been described as either spherical or cylindrical to ellipsoidal, with colorations ranging from white to pink, due to the production of the iron chelate pulcherrimin within the cells.

== Genomic analysis ==
Based on sequences of its nucleic acid, K. dobzhanskii is considered to be a very close relative of K. lactis, K. wickerhamii, and K. marxianus, which is reinforced by the fact that it can mate to create fertile offspring with these three species in a laboratory setting. K. dobzhanskii has been found to have a diverse array of karyotypes among its strains.

== Ecology ==
Kluyveromyces dobzhanskii appears to be associated with insects. It was first isolated from a Drosophila species in the Santa Rosa and San Jacinto Mountains National Monument in California. It has also been isolated from the moth species Noctua pronuba and Valeria sp.
