= Kluyveromyces nonfermentans =

Scientific classification
- Kingdom: Fungi
- Division: Ascomycota
- Class: Saccharomycetes
- Order: Saccharomycetales
- Family: Saccharomycetaceae
- Genus: Kluyveromyces
- Species: K. nonfermentans

Binomial name
- Kluyveromyces nonfermentans Nagahama, 1999

Species of fungus

Kluyveromyces nonfermentans is a Kluyveromyces species occurring as a yeast. It was originally isolated from the deep sea, with various strains being isolated from sediment, a clam, and a crab. It is notable among the Kluyveromyces species as the only member unable to ferment glucose.

== Discovery ==
In 1999, eleven strains of a previously unknown Kluyveromyces species were discovered in deep-sea samples from Suruga Bay and Sagami Bay off the coast of Honshu, Japan. The samples originated from marine sediment, a Calyptogena clam, and an unknown crab species.

== Genomic analysis ==
At the time of discovery, K. nonfermentans was determined to be most closely related to Kluyveromyces aestuarii based on 18S rRNA gene sequences.
