= Vanderwaltozyma polyspora =

Scientific classification
- Kingdom: Fungi
- Division: Ascomycota
- Class: Saccharomycetes
- Order: Saccharomycetales
- Family: Saccharomycetaceae
- Genus: Vanderwaltozyma
- Species: V. polyspora

Binomial name
- Vanderwaltozyma polyspora (van der Walt) Kurtzman 2003

Synonyms
- Kluyveromyces polysporus Van der Walt (1956). Saccharomyces polysporus (Van der Walt) I.Campb. (1972).

Species of fungus

Vanderwaltozyma polyspora is a species of multi-spored yeast fungus in the family Saccharomycetaceae found in soil, first described by Johannes P. van der Walt, and moved to a new genus by Cletus P. Kurtzman in 2003 (together with Vanderwaltozyma yarrowii).

== Background ==
Like other Vanderwaltozyma species it is characterized by the fermentation of glucose and galactose and the assimilation of nitrogen sources like ethylamine, nitrate, lysine, and cadaverine. V. polyspora has been rarely isolated from natural sources, with only eight strains of the species isolated and reported until 2020. It has oblong to reniform ascospores that release spores quickly, and it can produce up to 100 ascospores due to supernumerary mitosis in the ascus parent cell. Growth on agar has cream to brownish color and is butyrous to glossy.
