= Nakaseomyces bracarensis =

Scientific classification
- Kingdom: Fungi
- Division: Ascomycota
- Class: Saccharomycetes
- Order: Saccharomycetales
- Family: Saccharomycetaceae
- Genus: Nakaseomyces
- Species: N. bracarensis

Binomial name
- Nakaseomyces bracarensis (A. Correia, P. Samp., S.A. James & C. Pais) Sugita & M. Takash. (2022)

Synonyms
- Candida bracarensis A. Correia, P. Samp., S.A. James & C. Pais (2006)

Species of fungus

Nakaseomyces bracarensis is an anamorphic yeast species with type strain 153M^{T} (=CBS 10154^{T} =NCYC D3853^{T} =CECT 12000^{T}).
