= Kluyveromyces wickerhamii =

Scientific classification
- Kingdom: Fungi
- Division: Ascomycota
- Class: Saccharomycetes
- Order: Saccharomycetales
- Family: Saccharomycetaceae
- Genus: Kluyveromyces
- Species: K. wickerhamii

Binomial name
- Kluyveromyces wickerhamii (Phaff, M.W. Mill & Shifrine) Van der Walt, 1971

Synonyms
- Dekkeromyces wickerhamii; Guilliermondella wickerhamii; Zygofabospora wickerhamii; Saccharomyces wickerhamii

Species of fungus

Kluyveromyces wickerhamii is a fungus in the genus Kluyveromyces that exists as a yeast.

== Taxonomy ==
Upon discovery in 1956, K. wickerhamii was placed into the genus Saccharomyces. A 1965 reorganization of the genus Kluyveromyces included the introduction of K. wickerhamii to the genus. It was named after mycologist Lynferd Wickerham due to his contributions to yeast taxonomy.

== Growth and morphology ==
After growth on YM agar, the cells of K. wickerhamii have been described as "spherical to cylindrical" with colorations ranging from cream to pink or brown, due to the production of the iron chelate pulcherrimin. Cells grown in malt extract media have been described as oval in shape, and can occur individually, paired, or in chains. A thin pellicle can be observed when grown in glucose-yeast extract broth. Pseudohyphae can be observed when grown on corn meal agar.

K. wickerhamii has the ability to ferment certain compounds. It can ferment glucose, and can weakly ferment galactose and sucrose. It lacks the ability to ferment lactose, as well as maltose and raffinose.

== Ecology ==
Kluyveromyces wickerhamii is believed to be associated with insects. It was first isolated from the gastrointestinal tract of the fly species Drosophila pinicola and Drosophila montana in Aspen Valley, in Yosemite National Park. It has also been isolated from tree species Northern Red Oak (Quercus rubra) and Fremont's Cottonwood (Populus fremontii). These trees likely host K. wickerhamii due to their status as habitats to Drosophila flies.

== Utility as an antifungal producer ==
Kluyveromyces wickerhamii, like other members of Kluyveromyces, is known to naturally produce an antifungal substance. It has been suggested that this antifungal production may be a useful tool to prevent wine spoilage by other yeasts such as Brettanomyces.
