= Kluyveromyces aestuarii =

Scientific classification
- Kingdom: Fungi
- Division: Ascomycota
- Class: Saccharomycetes
- Order: Saccharomycetales
- Family: Saccharomycetaceae
- Genus: Kluyveromyces
- Species: K. aestuarii

Binomial name
- Kluyveromyces aestuarii (Fell) van der Walt, 1965

Synonyms
- Saccharomyces aestuarii; Zygofabospora aestuarii; Dekkeromyces aestuarii

Species of fungus

Kluyveromyces aestuarii is a Kluyveromyces species of fungus occurring as a marine yeast. It was discovered in 1961 and was originally placed in the genus Saccharomyces.

== Taxonomy ==
Upon discovery, the fungus was named Saccharomyces aestuarii. A 1965 evaluation of the genus Kluyveromyces placed the species within that genus, with the new name of Kluyveromyces aestuarii, based on the properties of its ascospore formation.

== Growth and morphology ==
Colonies of K. aestuarii have colorations ranging from white to deep ochre, due to the presence of the iron chelate pulcherrimin in the cells. The cells are globose to ellipsoidal in shape when grown on Yeast-Mold (YM) agar, and range between roughly 2–6×3–7 μm in size. Pseudohyphae formation occurs after roughly two weeks of growth on corn meal agar. K. aestuarii is not particularly thermotolerant, and cannot grow at or above 37 °C. It has the ability to ferment glucose, as well as sucrose and raffinose, but cannot ferment galactose, lactose, or maltose.

== Ecology ==
Kluyveromyces aestuarii is a marine fungus. It was first isolated from shallow estuarine sediment in Biscayne Bay, off the coast of Florida. It has also been discovered in the Torres Strait of Australia, as well as in a mangrove forest near Rio de Janeiro, Brazil, where it was isolated from a shipworm (Neoteredo reynei), a clam (Tagelus plebius), and two crab species (Sesarma rectum and Uca spp.). K. aestuarii has been identified as a possible indicator organism for environmental pollution of mangrove forests.
