= Torulaspora =

Scientific classification
- Kingdom: Fungi
- Division: Ascomycota
- Class: Saccharomycetes
- Order: Saccharomycetales
- Family: Saccharomycetaceae
- Genus: Torulaspora; Lindner, 1904

Species
- Torulaspora delbrueckii; Torulaspora franciscae; Torulaspora globosa; Torulaspora pretoriensis

Genus of fungi

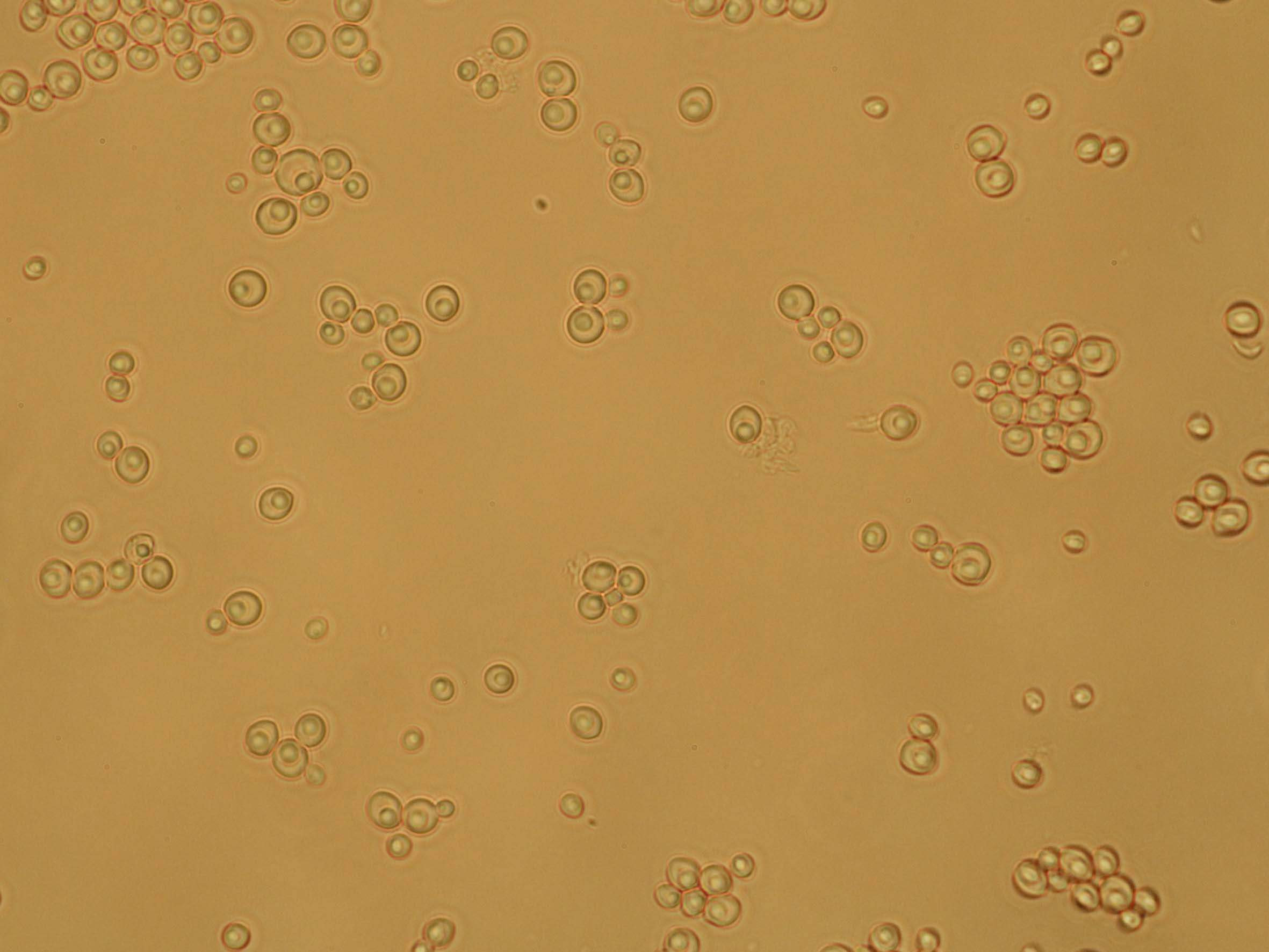
Spores of Torulaspora delbrueckii

Torulaspora is a genus of ascomycetous yeasts in the family Saccharomycetaceae.

== See also ==
- Yeast in winemaking
