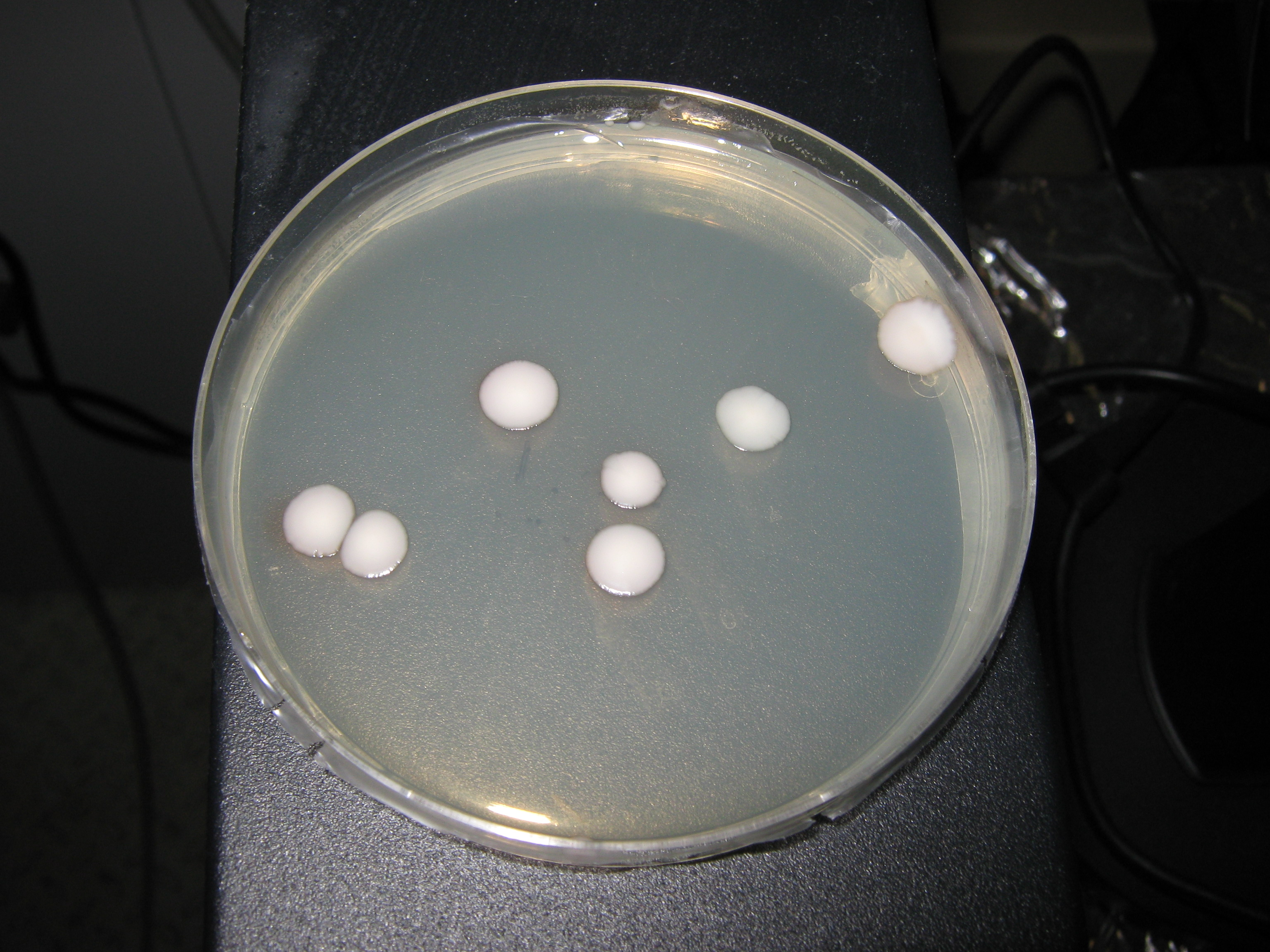

Scientific classification
- Kingdom: Fungi
- Division: Ascomycota
- Class: Saccharomycetes
- Order: Saccharomycetales
- Family: Saccharomycetaceae
- Genus: Kluyveromyces; Van der Walt, 1956

Species
- K. aestuarii; K. dobzhanskii; K. lactis; K. marxianus; K. nonfermentans; K. wickerhamii

= Kluyveromyces =

Genus of fungi

Kluyveromyces is a genus of ascomycetous yeasts in the family Saccharomycetaceae. Some of the species, such as K. marxianus, are the teleomorphs of Candida species.

The genus name of Kluyveromyces is in honour of Albert Jan Kluyver ForMemRS (1888-1956), who was a Dutch microbiologist and biochemist.

The genus was circumscribed by Johannes P. Van der Walt in Antonie van Leeuwenhoek vol.22 on pages 268–271 in 1956.

Mating and sporulation in Kluyveromyces are co-induced by poor environments and most often occur in succession without intervening diploid mitotic cell divisions.

A RAD52 gene homolog from Kluyveromyces lactis was cloned and characterized. This gene, which has a central role in recombinational repair of DNA, can complement S. cerevisiae rad52 mutants.

== Species ==
Kluyveromyces is widely cultured for microbiological and genetic research. Some important species include:

- Kluyveromyces lactis
- Kluyveromyces marxianus
- Kluyveromyces thermotolerans

== See also ==
- Yeast in winemaking
