= Arxiozyma heterogenica =

Scientific classification
- Kingdom: Fungi
- Division: Ascomycota
- Class: Saccharomycetes
- Order: Saccharomycetales
- Family: Saccharomycetaceae
- Genus: Arxiozyma
- Species: A. heterogenica

Binomial name
- Arxiozyma heterogenica (Kurtzman & Robnett) Q.M. Wang, Yurkov & Boekhout 2024

Subspecies
- Kazachstania heterogenica var. weizmannii or Kazachstania weizmannii

Synonyms
- Kazachstania heterogenica

Species of yeast

Arxiozyma heterogenica is a species of yeast from the family Saccharomycetaceae. In 2024, a commensal strain dubbed K. heterogenica var. weizmannii, isolated from mouse feces, was reported to potentially prevent opportunistic infections by Candida albicans, a main causing agent of candidiasis in humans.

== Taxonomy ==
Arxiozyma heterogenica was first described as 2005 as Kazachstania heterogenica and was found to be closely related to the species in the Kazachstania telluris Complex, which was formed from several former Candida species.

== Ecology ==
In contrast to other species in the former K. telluris Complex which are usually pathogenic, commensal strains of A. heterogenica have been reported from rodents. The presence of one commensal strain in the intestine of mice, originally described as K. heterogenica var. weizmannii, was shown to prevent the colonization by Candida albicans, with several press reports commenting on its potential to combat infections by C. albicans ascribing these findings to a novel species named Kazachstania weizmannii. Other complex members of K. telluris Complex are K.telluris, K.bovina, K.slooffiae, and K.pintolopesii.

== Subspecies ==
=== Kazachstania heterogenica var. weizmannii ===
Kazachstania heterogenica var. weizmannii often shortened to K.weizmannii is a member of the K.telluris complex and is thought to be a commencial strain of the K.telluris complex where most strains are usually pathogenic and is shown to prevent the colonization by Candida albicans. It was isolated from murine intestines and is shown to be beneficial to mice infected by C. albicans. Due to this K.weizmannii has the potential to combat diseases like candidiasis caused by C. albicans.
