= K. exigua =

K. exigua may refer to:

- Kazachstania exigua, a yeast used in the production of sourdough
- Kyllinga exigua, a flowering plant
