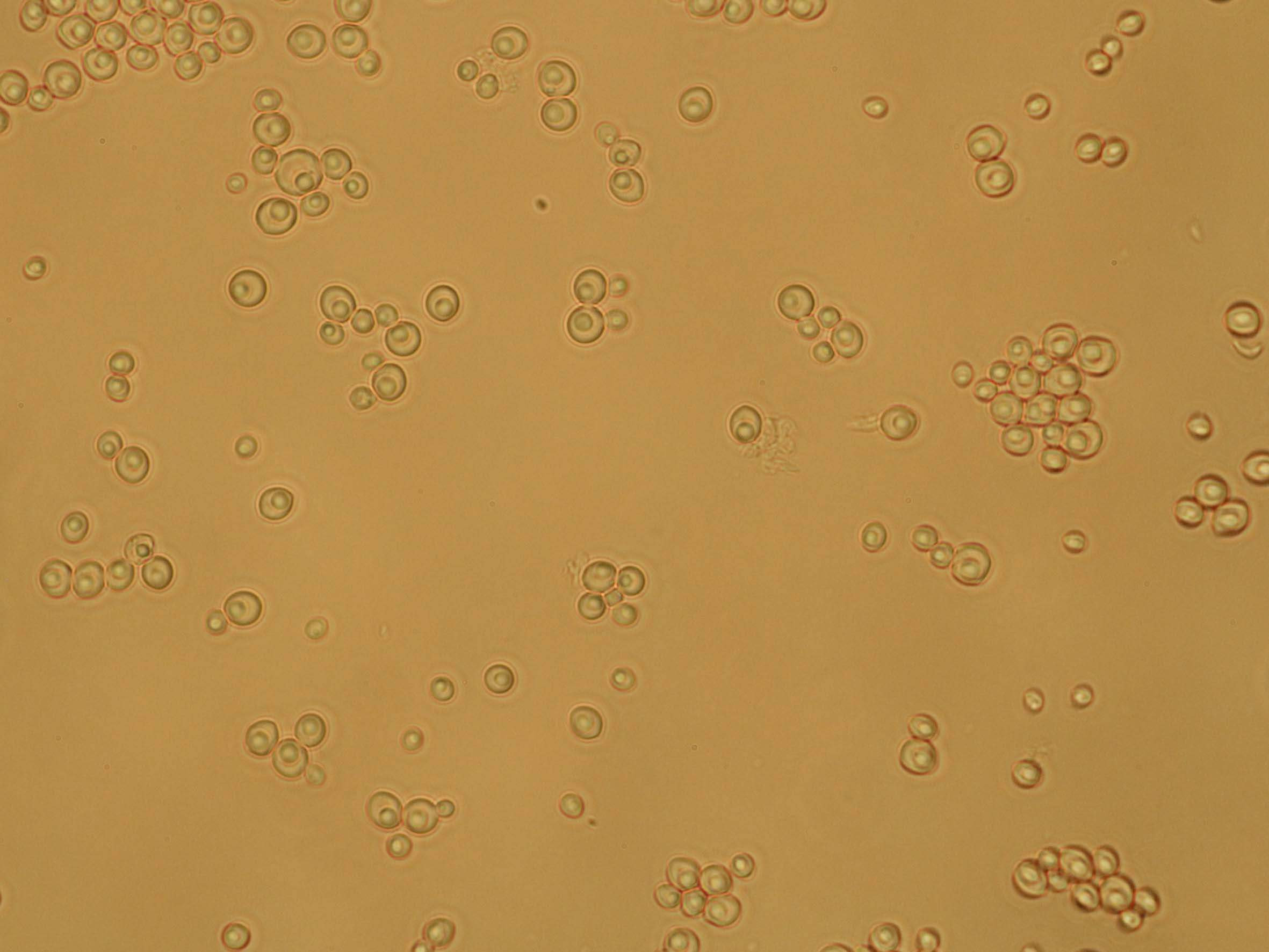

Scientific classification
- Kingdom: Fungi
- Division: Ascomycota
- Class: Saccharomycetes
- Order: Saccharomycetales
- Family: Saccharomycetaceae
- Genus: Torulaspora
- Species: T. delbrueckii

Binomial name
- Torulaspora delbrueckii (Lindner) Lindner

Synonyms
- Candida colliculosa; Cryptococcus colliculosus; Debaryomyces delbrueckii; Debaryomyces rosei; Eutorula colliculosa; Saccharomyces delbrueckii; Saccharomyces fermentati Saito; Saccharomyces florenzanoi Balloni et al.; Saccharomyces inconspicuus van der Walt; Saccharomyces microellipsoides var. osmophilus van der Walt; Saccharomyces rosei; Saccharomyces saitoanus var. mongolicus van der Walt; Saccharomyces torulosus Osterwalder; Saccharomyces vafer van der Walt; Schwanniomyces hominis Batista et al.; Torula colliculosa Hartmann; Torulaspora benedictae Capriotti; Torulaspora fermentati Saito; Torulaspora mongolica; Torulaspora nilssoni Capriotti; Torulaspora rosei Guilliermond; Torulopsis colliculosa; Torulopsis stellata var. cambresieri Lodder & Kreger-van Rij; Torulopsis taboadae; Zygosaccharomyces delbrueckii; Zygosaccharomyces fermentati; Zygosaccharomyces mongolicus Saito; Zymodebaryomyces delbrueckii; Zymodebaryomyces rosei

= Torulaspora delbrueckii =

Species of fungus

Torulaspora delbrueckii is a ubiquitous yeast species with both wild and anthropic habitats. The type strain of T. delbrueckii is CBS 1146^{T}, equivalent to CLIB 230 or ATCC 10662, etc.. The type strain of T. delbrueckii CBS 1146 ^{T} was sequenced in 2009, and is composed of 8 chromosomes in addition to a mitochondrial genome.

Torulaspora delbrueckii was formerly known as Saccharomyces delbrueckii or Saccharomyces rosei or Saccharomyces roseus, and the anamorph is called Candida colliculosa (for a complete list of synonyms, see CBS's website).

Torulaspora delbrueckii is the most studied species of the genus Torulaspora that comprises eight species to date, including T. franciscae, T. pretoriensis, T. microellipsoides, T. globosa, T. indica, T. maleeae, and T. quercuum. The taxonomy of the genus Torulaspora is evolving rapidly, and the availability of molecular tools to discriminate Torulaspora species will help correcting errors in species assignments.

== Habitats ==
Torulaspora delbrueckii is isolated from several human bioprocesses, including the bread industry where some T. delbrueckii strains are commercialized for frozen dough applications. Other applications include food fermentations of silage, cocoa, olive or cucumber; distilled and traditional fermented beverage production including mescal, colonche, tequila, cider, strawberry tree fruits juice, sugarcane juice or kefir; dairy products' fermentations like traditional cheeses and fermented milk. Torulaspora delbrueckii can be an opportunistic spoilage yeast for dairy products or soft drinks (fruit juices, etc.). Torulaspora delbrueckii colonizes several natural environments, ranging from soils, to plants, fruits and insects. T.delbrueckii is occasionally found as a clinical isolate, although not considered to be a human pathogen, a state described as opportunistic pathogen.

== Winemaking ==
Torulaspora delbrueckii has been associated with winemaking for decades and isolated either from grape, must or wine. Torulaspora delbrueckii is now proposed as starter culture (to be associated with S. cerevisiae in mixed cultures) for certain applications, particularly to reduce volatile acidity in high-sugar fermentations like in Sauternes wines. Recent findings show that T. delbrueckii species has been domesticated for winemaking and other human uses about 1900 and 4000 years ago respectively.

== Life-cycle ==
The life-cycle of T. delbrueckii remains unclear. Some authors consider T. delbrueckii to be a haploid species, while more recent findings suggest T. delbrueckii have a mostly diploid homothallic life. To date, the life-cycle of the species is not formally elucidated.
