= Torulaspora globosa =

Scientific classification
- Kingdom: Fungi
- Division: Ascomycota
- Class: Saccharomycetes
- Order: Saccharomycetales
- Family: Saccharomycetaceae
- Genus: Torulaspora
- Species: T. globosa

Binomial name
- Torulaspora globosa Van der Walt & Johannsen (1975)

Species of fungus

Torulaspora globosa is a yeast fungus in the genus Torulaspora. This species can be found in the rhizosphere and is beneficial for agricultural activities. Considered a plant growth promoting rhizobacteria, this species helps with plant health maintenance. It is important for biofuel production and is a promising biocontrol agent.

== Description ==
T. globosa can use glucose, ethanol, sucrose, and other carbon sources for growth. It has a round-oval shape, arranges in pairs, and has a creamy and shiny appearance on agar. It has a range of size of about 1-7 micrometers n breadth and 2-8 micrometers in length. It divides by multipolar budding. It can utilize ammonia as a nitrogen source. No spores are present, asexual nor sexual. It displays no filamentous growth.

== Lipid and ethanol generation ==
Biodiesel is a mixture of mono-alkyl esters of long chain fatty acids that can be used instead of regular diesel with superior performance. Recently there has been a search for new ways of producing biodiesel that is not made from food. Yeast strains including Torulaspora produce lipids that are similar in composition to the vegetable oils we use now to synthesize biodiesel. Torulaspora globosa was found to produce around 3.12g/L of usable lipids for days. After nitrogen and sugar sources deplete the yield decreases, Zinc seems to play a role in its produced lipids along with nutritional elements. Alongside lipids, T. globosa can undergo fermentation to produce ethanol, another compound that can be used as biofuel. It was found to be able to ferment effectively up to 40 degrees Celsius and could tolerate the increased ethanol levels.

== Biocontrol ==
Studies have shown that Torulaspora globosa is a good mycelial growth inhibitor, specifically against Colletotrichum. In vitro tests showed that T. globosa has an antagonistic effect on mycelial growth against the phytopathogenic mold Colletotrichum sublineolum. Results showed hyphal damage caused by the yeast on the agar dishes. T. globosa is considered mycocinogenic, despite not producing any volatile compounds, siderophores, or hydrolytic enzymes.

== Plant growth promotion ==
T. globosa has been shown to decrease root length while increasing biomass of lettuce. This study found that the root length was decreased but the roots exhibited greater branching than before. Shoot biomass was also increased, along with wider and longer leaves.

T. globosa reduces indole acetic acid which promotes growth of most plants and can solubilize minerals used by the plants.
