= Saccharomyces telluris =

Scientific classification
- Kingdom: Fungi
- Division: Ascomycota
- Class: Saccharomycetes
- Order: Saccharomycetales
- Family: Saccharomycetaceae
- Genus: Saccharomyces
- Species: S. telluris

Binomial name
- Saccharomyces telluris van der Walt 1957

Species of fungus

Saccharomyces telluris is a species of yeast also known as Kazachstania telluris. Strains of the species have been isolated from microbiota colonizing birds, though the serotype of a particular strain may differ by species.
