= Vanderwaltozyma =

Scientific classification
- Kingdom: Fungi
- Division: Ascomycota
- Class: Saccharomycetes
- Order: Saccharomycetales
- Family: Saccharomycetaceae
- Genus: Vanderwaltozyma; Kurtzman 2003

Type species
- Vanderwaltozyma polyspora

Genus of fungi

Vanderwaltozyma is a genus of ascomycetous yeasts in the family Saccharomycetaceae.

The genus name is in honour of Johannes P. van der Walt (1925-2011), a South African mycologist who first described Vanderwaltozyma polyspora and Vanderwaltozyma yarrowii (in the Kluyveromyces genus). The genus was circumscribed by Cletus P. Kurtzman in 2003.

Vanderwaltozyma species are characterized by the fermentation of glucose and galactose, the assimilation of nitrogen sources like ethylamine, nitrate, lysine, and cadaverine, and spores shaped spheroidal, oblong, or reniform.

== Species ==
According to Catalogue of Life (as of May 2023), the genus has 7 accepted species:

- Vanderwaltozyma huisunica C.F. Lee & Chin F. Chang
- Vanderwaltozyma meishanica C.F. Lee & Chin F. Chang
- Vanderwaltozyma molinica C.F. Lee & Chin F. Chang
- Vanderwaltozyma polyspora (Van der Walt) Kurtzman
- Vanderwaltozyma tropicalis Nakase, Jindam., Kenji Tanaka, Ninomiya, Limtong, H. Kawas. & C.F. Lee
- Vanderwaltozyma verrucispora C.F. Lee, Chun H. Liu, Ninomiya, H. Kawas. & Nakase
- Vanderwaltozyma yarrowii (Van der Walt) Kurtzman
