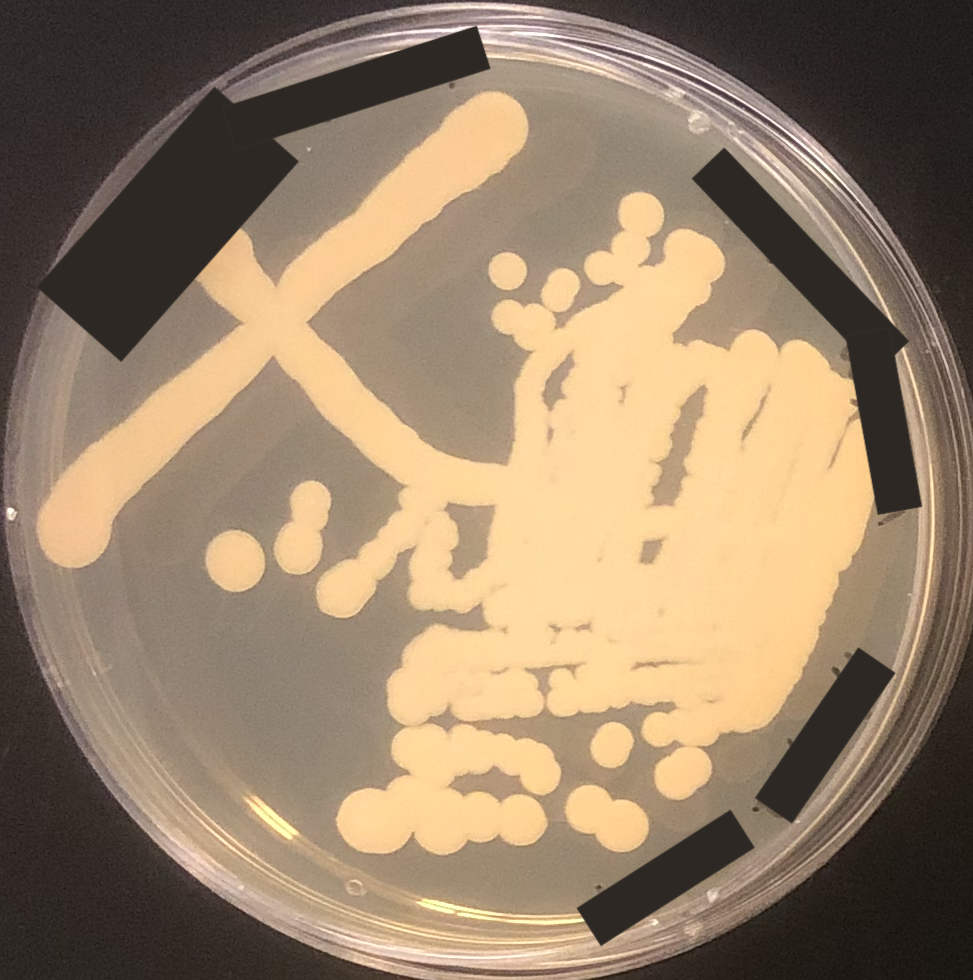
- Kluyveromyces lactis yeast culture on a plate

Scientific classification
- Kingdom: Fungi
- Division: Ascomycota
- Subdivision: Saccharomycotina
- Class: Saccharomycetes
- Order: Saccharomycetales
- Family: Saccharomycetaceae
- Genus: Kluyveromyces
- Species: K. lactis

Binomial name
- Kluyveromyces lactis (Stell.-Dekk.) Van der Walt

= Kluyveromyces lactis =

Species of fungus

Kluyveromyces lactis is a Kluyveromyces yeast commonly used for genetic studies and industrial applications. Its name comes from the ability to assimilate lactose and convert it into lactic acid.

Kluyveromyces lactis (formerly Saccharomyces lactis) is a yeast which has the ability to assimilate lactose and convert it into lactic acid. K. lactis and other organisms i.e., Aspergillus niger var awamori and Escherichia coli K-12 are grown in fermenters to produce chymosin (rennet) on a commercial scale; this rennet, which replaces the conventional form obtained from slaughtered animals, is now widely used in cheese production.

Yeasts and fungi are ideal organisms for comparative genomic studies in eukaryotes because of their small and compact genomes and because they include a number of species such as Neurospora crassa, Saccharomyces cerevisiae and Schizosaccharomyces pombe, that have been, and continue to be, used extensively in genetic studies. However, the divergence between these three species is ancient (estimated to be at least 300 million years old) and the organization of their genomes is quite different. The diversity of the hemiascomycetes, a group of ascomycetes that contains most of the known yeast species, was first explored in 2000.

Complete sequencing and comparison of four hemiascomycetous yeasts has been undertaken for Nakaseomyces glabratus, Kluyveromyces lactis, Debaryomyces hansenii, and Yarrowia lipolytica. They were selected on the basis of their phylogenetic positions and their specific interest as human pathogens, or as industrially or environmentally important yeasts. This work, which represents the first multispecies exploration of genome evolution across an entire eukaryotic phylum, reveals the variety of events and mechanisms that have taken place, and should allow useful comparisons with other phyla of multicellular organisms when more genome sequences are determined.

K. lactis is a heterothallic species with a predominantly haplontic cycle, in contrast to S. cerevisiae in which the predominantly diplobiontic cycle is pseudo-heterothallic due to mating-type switching.

== Genomics analysis ==
In the 1990s, few genes were known and analysed by scientists until the first genomic analysis was performed by a team of the Pasteur Institute of Paris. Random exploration of the Kluyveromyces lactis genome and comparison with that of Saccharomyces cerevisiae</ref> The genome Kluyveromyces lactis was explored by sequencing 588 short tags from two random genomic libraries (random sequenced tags, or RSTs). 296 K. lactis genes were identified of which 292 were new.

The complete genome of K. lactis was sequenced in 2004.

This species has roughly 5,300 genes spread out over six nuclear chromosomess and its mitochondrial genome. The six chromosomes are labeled A-F.
