= Kazachstania =

Kazachstania may refer to:

- Kazachstania (trilobite), an arthropod genus in the family Dalmanitidae
- Kazachstania (fungus), a yeast genus in the family Saccharomycetaceae
  - Kazachstania exigua
  - Kazachstania yasuniensis
  - Kazachstania servazii

== See also ==
- Kazakhstania, a geological terrane, block or craton in Central Asia.
