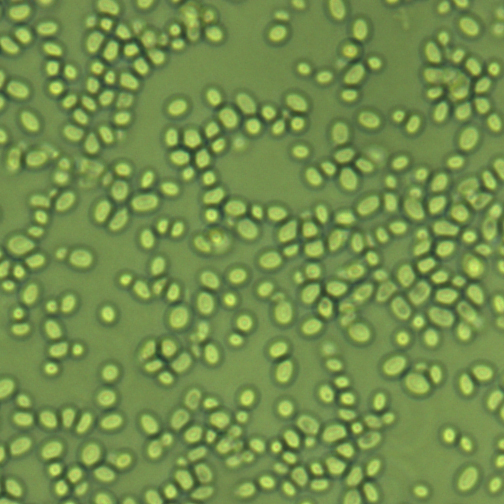
- Nakaseomyces glabratus 1600x

Scientific classification
- Kingdom: Fungi
- Division: Ascomycota
- Class: Saccharomycetes
- Order: Saccharomycetales
- Family: Saccharomycetaceae
- Genus: Nakaseomyces
- Species: N. glabratus

Binomial name
- Nakaseomyces glabratus (H. W. Anderson) Sugita & Takashima (2022)

Synonyms
- Cryptococcus glabratus H.W.Anderson (1917); Torulopsis glabrata (H.W.Anderson) Lodder & N.F.de Vries (1938); Candida glabrata (H.W. Anderson) S.A. Mey. & Yarrow (1978)

= Nakaseomyces glabratus =

Species of fungus

Nakaseomyces glabratus is a species of haploid yeast of the genus Nakaseomyces, previously known as Candida glabrata. Despite the fact that no sexual life cycle has been documented for this species, N. glabratus strains of both mating types are commonly found. N. glabrata is generally a commensal of human mucosal tissues, but in today's era of wider human immunodeficiency from various causes (for example, therapeutic immunomodulation, longer survival with various comorbidities such as diabetes, and HIV infection), N. glabratus is often the second or third most common cause of candidiasis as an opportunistic pathogen. Infections caused by N. glabratus can affect the urogenital tract or even cause systemic infections by entrance of the fungal cells in the bloodstream (Candidemia), especially prevalent in immunocompromised patients.

== Clinical relevance ==
N. glabratus is of special relevance in nosocomial infections due to its innately high resistance to antifungal agents, specifically the azoles. Besides its innate tolerance to antifungal drugs, other potential virulence factors contribute to N. glabratus pathogenicity. One of them is the expression of a series of adhesins genes. These genes, which in N. glabratus are mostly encoded in the subtelomeric region of the chromosome, have their expression highly activated by environmental cues, so that the organism can adhere to biotic and abiotic surfaces in microbial mats. Adhesin expression is the suspected first mechanism by which N. glabratus forms fungal biofilms, proved to be more resistant to antifungals than the planktonic cells.

N. glabratus genome frequently undergoes rearrangements that are hypothesized to contribute to the improvement of this yeast's fitness towards exposure to stressful conditions, and some authors consider that this property is connected to the virulence potential of this yeast.

== Diagnosis ==
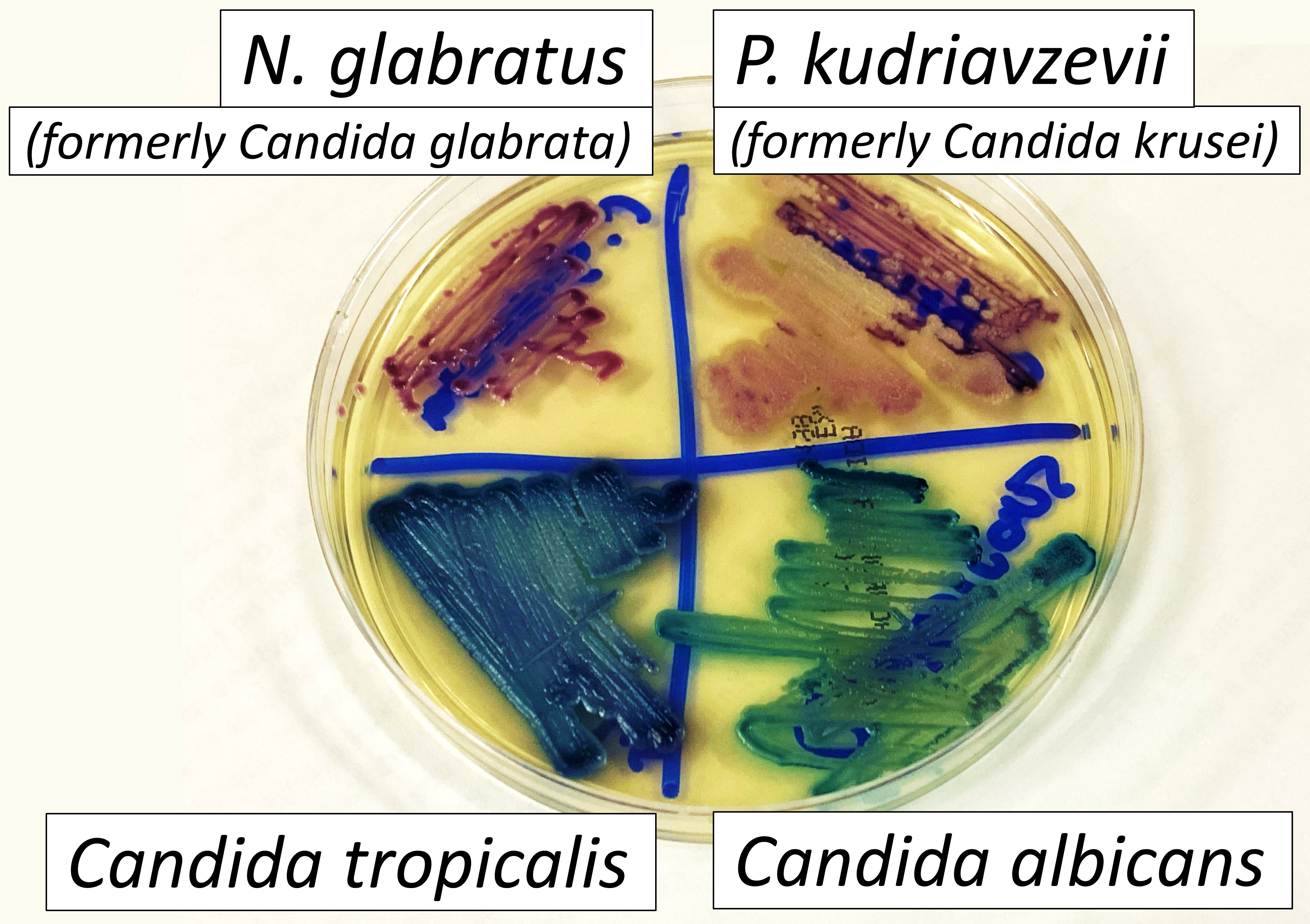
Chromogenic agar can help in indicating N. glabratus infection versus some similar fungi. (CHROMAgar shown)

Cultures are an effective method for identifying non-albicans vaginal infections. Urinalyses are less accurate in this process. The culture may take several days to grow, but the identification of the yeast species is quick once the yeast is isolated. Skin disease diagnosis is difficult, as cultures collected from swabs and biopsies will test negative for fungus and a special assessment is required. Listed under the 'Rare Diseases' database on the NIH web site, Torulopsis glabrata, or N. glabratus can also be found on the CDC's web site. Although listed as the second most virulent yeast after Candida albicans, the fungus is becoming more and more resistant to common treatments like fluconazole. N. glabratus resistance to Echinocandin is also increasing, leaving expensive and toxic antifungal treatments available for those infected. Although high mortality rates are listed, assessment of the critical nature of a glabrata infection is a gray area.

N. glabratus ferments and assimilates only glucose and trehalose, opposing to Candida species and this repertoire of sugar utilization is used by several commercially available kits for identification.

== Treatment ==
A major phenotype and potential virulence factor that N. glabratus possesses is low-level intrinsic resistance to the azole medications, which are the most commonly prescribed antifungal (antimycotic) medications. These medications, including fluconazole and ketoconazole, are "not effective in 15–20% of cases" against N. glabratus. It is still highly vulnerable to polyene medications such as amphotericin B and nystatin, along with variable vulnerability to flucytosine and caspofungin. However, intravenous amphotericin B is a medication of last resort, causing among other side effects, chronic kidney failure. Amphotericin B vaginal suppositories are used as an effective form of treatment in combination with boric acid capsules as they are not absorbed into the bloodstream.

A first-line treatment for vaginal infections may be the use of terconazole 7-day cream. Several courses may be needed. The cure-rate for this treatment is approximately 40%. Recurrences are common, causing chronic infections and spread to other areas such as skin and scalp. Blood infections might be best assessed per symptoms if other areas are involved.

An experimental, but effective second-line treatment for chronic infections, is the use of boric acid. Compounding pharmacies can create boric acid vaginal suppositories. Use of vitamin E oil may be used in conjunction to combat irritation. Amphotericin B vaginal suppositories have also been used in case studies to treat chronic infections, both symptomatic and asymptomatic. Borax and boric acid may be used for persistent scalp and skin infections.

== Phylogenetic relationship ==
N. glabratus is more closely related to Saccharomyces cerevisiae than to Candida species. In fact, N. glabratus belongs to the group of Nakaseomyces inside the whole genome duplication clade within Saccharomycetaceae. The whole genome duplication event occurred about 90 million years ago, whereas phylogenetic studies indicate that the common ancestor between N. glabratus and C. albicans is dated between 200 and 300 million years ago. The largest phylogenetic study to date about Saccharomycotina, also known as budding yeasts, indicated in 2018 that the (currently construed) genus Candida is found in Pichiaceae, CUG-Ser1 clade, Phaffomycetaceae and Saccharomycetaceae. Consequently, despite the name Candida evoking a unitary notion of candidiasis, the pathogenic power of some budding yeasts is a paraphyletic trait shared by several subphyla with different kinds of metabolism.
