= Kazachstania yasuniensis =

Scientific classification
- Kingdom: Fungi
- Division: Ascomycota
- Class: Saccharomycetes
- Order: Saccharomycetales
- Family: Saccharomycetaceae
- Genus: Kazachstania
- Species: K. yasuniensis

Binomial name
- Kazachstania yasuniensis S.A. James, E.J. Carvajal Barriga, P. Portero Barahona, C. Nueno-Palop, C.J. Bond & I.N. Roberts 2015

Species of yeast

Kazachstania yasuniensis is a yeast organism in the genus Kazachstania which can be found in a large variety of habitats such as fermented foods, animals, and wastewater.

== Isolation ==
Kazachstania yasuniensis was isolated on Ecuador and the Galápagos archipelago in arboreal regions. Seven strains of the genus Kazachstania were isolated in order to provide a thorough taxonomy for the novel species. These samples were cultured on 7.6% ethanol medium (Sniegowski et al. 2002). They were isolated either from rotten wood, soil, or decaying fruits. Based upon where these species were isolated, researchers concluded that K. yasuniensis most likely resides in an arboreal habitat. The strains were collected from the Ecuadorian Amazon, as well as the Scalesia forest of Santa Cruz Island in the Galápagos islands.

Although no gram staining was performed, K. yasuniensis cells were found to be ovoid and either single, paired, or in short chains or groups of cells using a scanning electron microscope.

== Characteristics ==
Morphologically, standard methods such as growth temperature testing using yeast extract-malt extract agar cultivation and sporulation tests on various agars were used. As far as physiological characterization goes, the novel species differed from its close relatives in that it absorbed trehalose and ethanol, while growing on ethylamine hydrogen chloride and sodium chloride. It was also unable to grow at 37 °C and absorb glucose, and could absorb sucrose, all of which are physiological aspects that differ from its close relatives.

The Si value was calculated for the species as well. A higher Si value indicates a more specialized species. The value for K. yasuniensis was 0.62, and therefore characterized with the majority of yeast species found in highly specialized environments.

Kazachstania yasuniensis was found to absorb and metabolize glucose, sucrose, raffinose, galactose, trehalose, cadaverine, ethylamine hydrochloride, and ethanol. It could not grow on inulin, melibiose, lactose, maltose, melezitose, methyl α- d-glucoside, starch, cellobiose, salicin, l-sorbose, l-rhamnose, d-xylose, l-arabinose, d-arabinose, d-ribose, methanol, glycerol, erythritol, ribitol, galactitol, d-mannitol, d-glucitol, inositol, dl-lactate, succinate, citrate, d-glucosamine, glucono- d-lactone, ysine, nitrate, xylitol, or 50% glucose/yeast extract. The organism proliferated at 30 °C, but there was no growth at 37 °C.

Multigene sequencing needs to be performed in order to establish clearer boundaries between yeast species. This is a very novel species and there is still much to be discovered.
