= Arxiozyma =

Scientific classification
- Kingdom: Fungi
- Division: Ascomycota
- Class: Saccharomycetes
- Order: Saccharomycetales
- Family: Saccharomycetaceae
- Genus: Arxiozyma; Van der Walt & Yarrow 1984

Type species
- Arxiozyma telluris

Species
- A. bovina A. heterogenica A. pintolopesii A. slooffiae A. telluris

Genus of yeast

Arxiozyma is a genus of yeast in the family Saccharomycetaceae.

== Taxonomy ==
The genus Arxiozyma was first introduced in 1984 with the reclassification of the type species Arxiozyma telluris from Saccharomyces. A. telluris was merged into the genus Kazachstania based on multigene phylogenetic analyses in 2003, where it formed the K. telluris species complex with several other reclassified species. By 2022, the K. telluris species complex contained the five species K. bovina, K. heterogenica, K. pintolopesii, K. slooffiae and K. telluris. The phylogenetic relation of these species was corroborated in further phylogenetic studies, including whole genome sequencing, and eventually led to the reinstatement of the original genus name Arxiozyma in 2024, encompassing the members of the K. telluris complex.
