= Kazachstania exigua =

Scientific classification
- Kingdom: Fungi
- Division: Ascomycota
- Class: Saccharomycetes
- Order: Saccharomycetales
- Family: Saccharomycetaceae
- Genus: Kazachstania
- Species: K. exigua

Binomial name
- Kazachstania exigua Kurtzman

Species of fungus

Kazachstania exigua is a yeast species that commonly occurs in olive brine and in some kefir cultures. It is one of the yeast species used in the production of sourdough. It is acid-tolerant and maltose-negative.
