= WHI3 =

WHI3 is a developmental regulator in budding yeast. It influences cell size and the cell cycle by binding CLN3 mRNA and inhibiting its translation. This, in turn, inhibits the G1/S transition.

== Function ==
WHI3 mediates many, often vital, processes such as the cell cycle, meiosis, filamentous growth and mating.

Regulation of the cell cycle is done by acting on the cyclin CLN3, a protein crucial to the G1/S transition in budding yeast. WHI3 acts by binding CLN3 mRNA, and then co-localizes, to form cytoplasmic foci. This locally restricts synthesis of the short-lived CLN3 protein, thus limiting its range. During G1, yeast has the ability to choose from a multitude of developmental options: meiosis, filamentation and mating. This is possible only when the cell arrests in G1, allowing it to continue down a different pathway.

It is also known that WHI3 directly interacts with Cdc28, and is needed to localize it to the cytoplasm during early G1. WHI3 forms a complex with the CLN3 protein, which is needed for the accumulation of Cdc28. In late G1, however, Cdc28 has been observed to localize to the nucleus.

Another, more recently discovered function of WHI3 is encoding for memory in budding yeast cells. Budding yeast is capable of both sexual and asexual reproduction. During sexual reproduction, two yeast cells signal their presence by diffusing pheromones, and it has been shown that when a cell is exposed to mating pheromones but does not perform mating, it "remembers" the event and is less likely to undergo mating afterwards. When exposed to pheromones, yeast will undergo cell-cycle arrest and attempt to mate, however, within the first three hours it will escape the arrest, and the previously inhibited CLN3 will resume activity. The WHI3 protein then aggregate and form a super-assembly, which is inactive and partially insoluble. This then forces the cell to continue with budding, since it is now conditioned against cell-cycle arrest. The daughter cells obtained from this budding, however, are not conditioned against mating, unlike the mother: the WHI3 aggregates have been shown to localize within the mother cell. This results in a mother cell retaining the memory of the previous encounter over multiple generations, while the new daughter cells are still responsive to mating cues.

== Structure ==
Using the WHI3 sequence, the protein is predicted to have a mass of 71,257 kD, an isoelectric point of 8.65, and a codon bias of 0.13. It also has been shown to have an RNA binding motif, similar to RNP-1 and RNP-2.

Its Cdc28-recruitment region has been shown to be on its N-terminal, spanning amino acids 121–220.
