= Nakaseomyces =

Scientific classification
- Kingdom: Fungi
- Division: Ascomycota
- Class: Saccharomycetes
- Order: Saccharomycetales
- Family: Saccharomycetaceae
- Genus: Nakaseomyces; Kurtzman, 2003

Genus of fungi

Nakaseomyces is a genus of yeasts in the family Saccharomycetaceae.
