= Thermotolerance =

Ability of organisms to survive high temperature

Thermotolerance is the ability of an organism to survive high temperatures. An organism's natural tolerance of heat is their basal thermotolerance. Meanwhile, acquired thermotolerance is defined as an enhanced level of thermotolerance after exposure to a heat stress.

== In plants ==
Multiple factors contribute to thermotolerance including signaling molecules like abscisic acid, salicylic acid, and pathways like the ethylene signaling pathway and heat stress response pathway.

The various heat stress response pathways enhance thermotolerance. The heat stress response in plants is mediated by heat shock transcription factors (HSF) and is well conserved across eukaryotes. HSFs are essential in plants’ ability to both sense and respond to stress. The HSFs, which are divided into three families (A, B, and C), encode the expression of heat shock proteins (HSP). Past studies have found that transcriptional activators HsfA1 and HsfB1 are the main positive regulators of heat stress response genes in Arabidopsis thaliana. The general pathway to thermotolerance is characterized by sensing of heat stress, activation of HSFs, upregulation of heat response, and return to the non-stressed state.

In 2011, while studying heat stress A. thaliana, Ikeda et al. concluded that the early response is regulated by HsfA1 and the extended response is regulated by HsfA2. They used RT-PCR to analyze the expression of HS-inducible genes of mutant (ectopic and nonfunctional HsfB1) and wild type plants. Plants with mutant HsfB1 had lower acquired thermotolerance, based on both lower expression of heat stress genes and visibly altered phenotypes. With these results they concluded that class A HSFs positively regulated the heat stress response while class B HSFs repressed the expression of HSF genes. Therefore, both were necessary for plants to return to non-stressed conditions and acquired thermotolerance.

== In bacteria ==
In bacteria, thermotolerance is the resistance of cells to the lethal effects of higher temperatures. Escherichia coli bacteria can be induced to undergo thermotolerance by exposure to a brief period of heat shock, i.e. 15 minutes at 42 degrees. As a result of such exposure the E. coli cells become resistant to the lethal effects of higher temperatures, such as 50 degrees. Thermotolerance in E. coli depends on the expression of the gene dnaK (that encodes a heat shock protein) so that thermotolerance does not develop in dnaK mutant cells.
