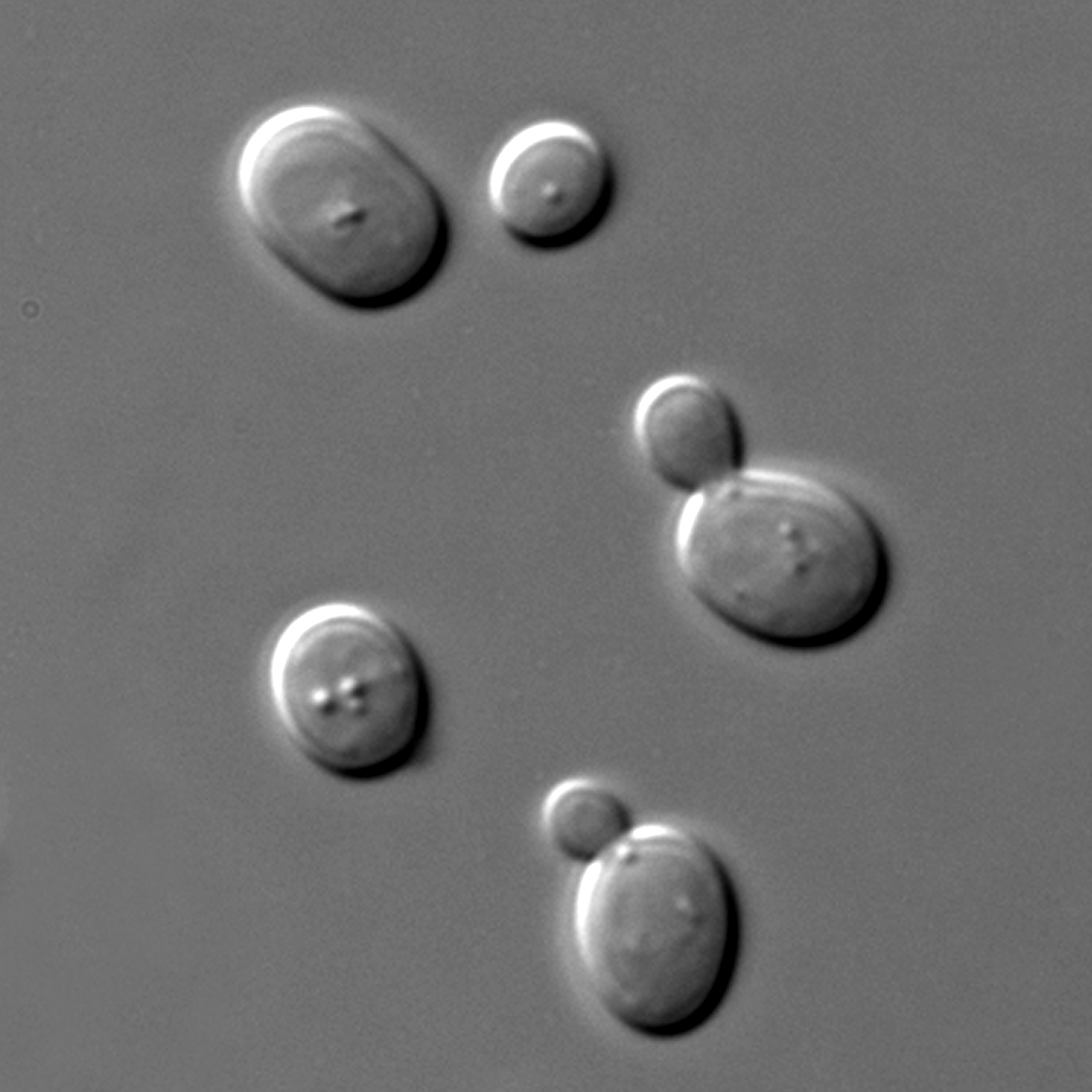
- Saccharomyces cerevisiae, a species of yeast
- Cross-sectional labelled diagram of a typical yeast cell

Scientific classification
- Kingdom: Fungi

Phyla and subphyla with yeast species
- Ascomycota p. p.: Saccharomycotina (true yeasts); Taphrinomycotina p. p.; Schizosaccharomycetes (fission yeasts); Basidiomycota p. p.: Agaricomycotina p. p.; Tremellomycetes; Pucciniomycotina p. p.; Microbotryomycetes

= Yeast =

Informal group of fungi

A yeast is any species of fungus that grows primarily in a unicellular form and reproduces via budding or fission. Yeasts are eukaryotic microorganisms that originated hundreds of millions of years ago, with at least 1,500 species currently recognized. They constitute about 1% of all described fungal species.

Some yeast species have the ability to develop multicellular characteristics by forming strings of connected budding cells known as pseudohyphae or false hyphae or in some cases true hyphae, or quickly evolve into a multicellular cluster with specialised cell organelle functions. Yeast sizes vary greatly, depending on species and environment, typically measuring 3–4 μm in diameter, although some yeasts can grow to 40 μm in size. Most yeasts reproduce asexually by mitosis, and many do so by the asymmetric division process known as budding. With their single-celled growth habit, yeasts can be contrasted with molds, which grow hyphae. Fungal species that can take both forms (depending on temperature or other conditions) are called dimorphic fungi.

The yeast species Saccharomyces cerevisiae converts carbohydrates to carbon dioxide and alcohols through the process of fermentation. The products of this reaction have been used in baking and the production of alcoholic beverages for thousands of years. S. cerevisiae is also an important model organism in modern cell biology research, and is one of the most thoroughly studied eukaryotic microorganisms. Researchers have cultured it in order to understand the biology of the eukaryotic cell and ultimately human biology in great detail. Other species of yeasts, such as Candida albicans, are opportunistic pathogens and can cause infections in humans. Yeasts have recently been used to generate electricity in microbial fuel cells and to produce ethanol for the biofuel industry.

Yeasts do not form a single taxonomic or phylogenetic grouping. The term "yeast" is often taken as a synonym for Saccharomyces cerevisiae, but the phylogenetic diversity of yeasts is shown by their placement in two separate phyla: the Ascomycota and the Basidiomycota. The budding yeasts, or "true yeasts", are classified in the order Saccharomycetales, within the phylum Ascomycota.

== History ==
The word yeast comes from Old English gist, gyst, and from the Indo-European root *yes-, meaning "boil", "foam", or "bubble". Yeast microbes are probably one of the earliest domesticated organisms. Archaeologists digging in Egyptian ruins found early grinding stones and baking chambers for yeast-raised bread, as well as drawings of 4,000-year-old bakeries and breweries. Vessels studied from several archaeological sites in Israel (dating to around 5,000, 3,000 and 2,500 years ago), which were believed to have contained alcoholic beverages (beer and mead), were found to contain yeast colonies that had survived over the millennia, providing the first direct biological evidence of yeast use in early cultures. In 1680, Dutch naturalist Anton van Leeuwenhoek first microscopically observed yeast, but at the time did not consider them to be living organisms, but rather globular structures as researchers were doubtful whether yeasts were algae or fungi. Theodor Schwann recognized them as fungi in 1837.

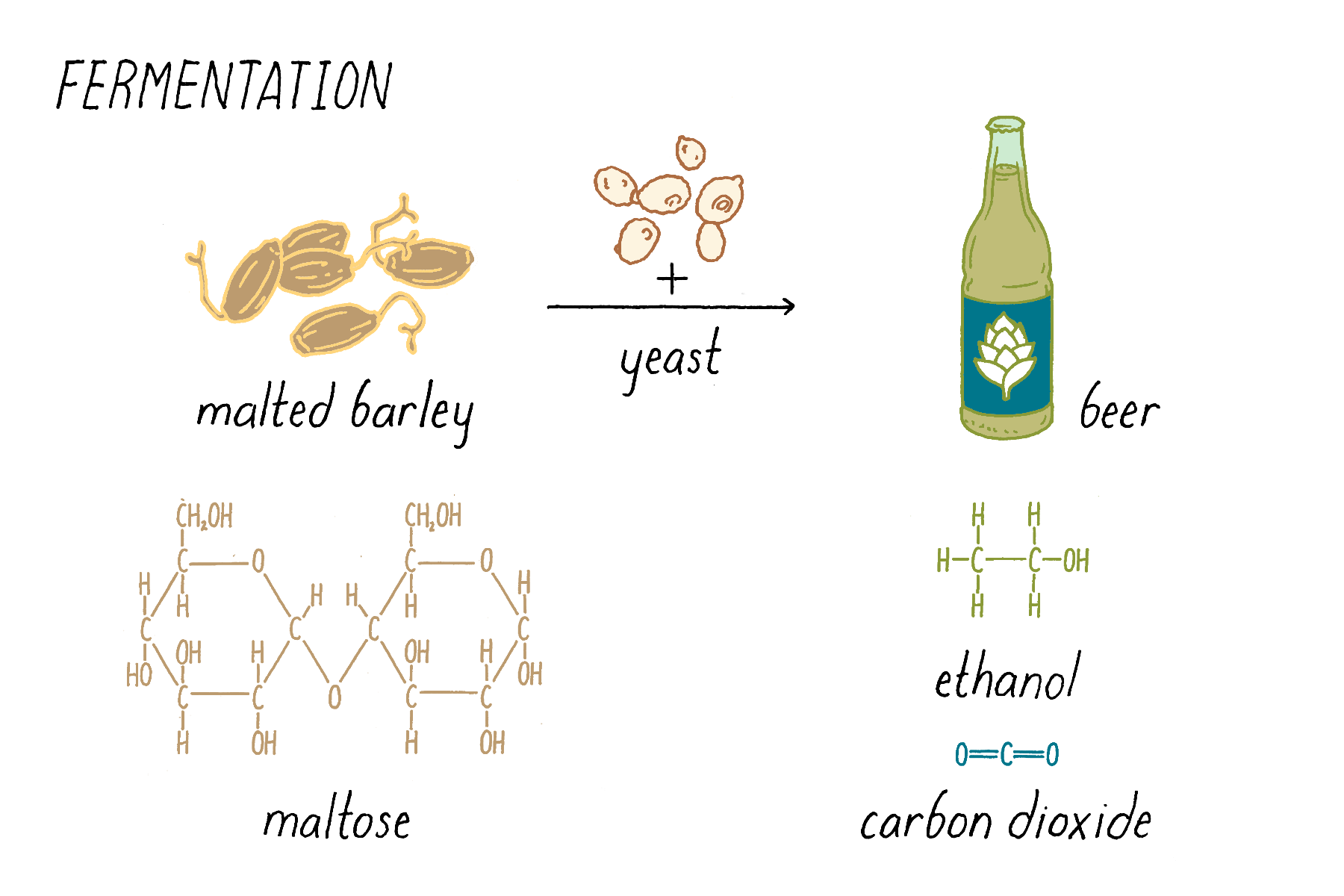
A biochemical process used to produce energy from the breakdown of carbohydrates (such as the sugar maltose) to simpler molecules such as ethanol. Fermentation by yeast produces beverages such as beer and wine.

In 1857, French microbiologist Louis Pasteur proved that bubbling oxygen into a yeast broth increased cell growth, but inhibited fermentation – an observation later called the "Pasteur effect". In the paper "Mémoire sur la fermentation alcoolique," Pasteur proved that alcoholic fermentation was conducted by living yeasts and not by a chemical catalyst.

By the late 18th century two yeast strains used in brewing had been identified: Saccharomyces cerevisiae (top-fermenting yeast) and S. pastorianus (bottom-fermenting yeast). S. cerevisiae has been sold commercially by the Dutch for bread-making since 1780; while, around 1800, the Germans started producing S. cerevisiae in the form of cream. In 1825, a method was developed to remove the liquid so the yeast could be prepared as solid blocks. The industrial production of yeast blocks was enhanced by the introduction of the filter press in 1867. In 1872, Baron Max de Springer developed a manufacturing process to create granulated yeast from beetroot molasses, a technique that was used until the first World War. In the United States, naturally occurring airborne yeasts were used almost exclusively until commercial yeast was marketed at the Centennial Exposition in 1876 in Philadelphia, where Charles L. Fleischmann exhibited the product and a process to use it, as well as serving the resultant baked bread.

The mechanical refrigerator (first patented in the 1850s in Europe) liberated brewers and winemakers from seasonal constraints for the first time and allowed them to exit cellars and other earthen environments. For John Molson, who made his livelihood in Montreal prior to the development of the refrigerator, the brewing season lasted from September through to May. The same seasonal restrictions formerly governed the distiller's art.

== Nutrition and growth ==
Yeasts are chemoorganotrophs, as they use organic compounds as a source of energy and do not require sunlight to grow. Carbon is obtained mostly from hexose sugars, such as glucose and fructose, or disaccharides such as sucrose and maltose. Some species can metabolize pentose sugars such as ribose, alcohols, and organic acids. Yeast species either require oxygen for aerobic cellular respiration (obligate aerobes) or are anaerobic, but also have aerobic methods of energy production (facultative anaerobes). Unlike bacteria, no known yeast species grow only anaerobically (obligate anaerobes). Most yeasts grow best in a neutral or slightly acidic pH environment.

Yeasts vary in regard to the temperature range in which they grow best. For example, Leucosporidium frigidum grows at −2 to 20 °C (28 to 68 °F), Saccharomyces telluris at 5 to 35 °C (41 to 95 °F), and Candida slooffi at 28 to 45 °C (82 to 113 °F). The cells can survive freezing under certain conditions, with viability decreasing over time.

In general, yeasts are grown in the laboratory on solid growth media or in liquid broths. Common media used for the cultivation of yeasts include potato dextrose agar or potato dextrose broth, Wallerstein Laboratories nutrient agar, yeast peptone dextrose agar, and yeast mould agar or broth. Home brewers who cultivate yeast frequently use dried malt extract and agar as a solid growth medium. The fungicide cycloheximide is sometimes added to yeast growth media to inhibit the growth of Saccharomyces yeasts and select for wild/indigenous yeast species. This will change the yeast process.

The appearance of a white, thready yeast, commonly known as kahm yeast, is often a byproduct of the lactofermentation (or pickling) of certain vegetables. It is usually the result of exposure to air. Although harmless, it can give pickled vegetables a bad flavor and must be removed regularly during fermentation.

== Ecology ==
Yeasts are very common in the environment, and are often isolated from sugar-rich materials. Examples include naturally occurring yeasts on the skins of fruits and berries (such as grapes, apples, or peaches), and exudates from plants (such as plant saps or cacti). Some yeasts are found in association with soil and insects. Yeasts from the soil and from the skins of fruits and berries have been shown to dominate fungal succession during fruit decay. The ecological function and biodiversity of yeasts are relatively unknown compared to those of other microorganisms. Yeasts, including Candida albicans, Rhodotorula rubra, Torulopsis and Trichosporon cutaneum, have been found living in between people's toes as part of their skin flora. Yeasts are also present in the gut flora of mammals and some insects and even deep-sea environments host an array of yeasts.

An Indian study of seven bee species and nine plant species found 45 species from 16 genera colonize the nectaries of flowers and honey stomachs of bees. Most were members of the genus Candida; the most common species in honey stomachs was Dekkera intermedia and in flower nectaries, Candida blankii. Yeast colonising nectaries of the stinking hellebore have been found to raise the temperature of the flower, which may aid in attracting pollinators by increasing the evaporation of volatile organic compounds. A black yeast has been recorded as a partner in a complex relationship between ants, their mutualistic fungus, a fungal parasite of the fungus and a bacterium that kills the parasite. The yeast has a negative effect on the bacteria that normally produce antibiotics to kill the parasite, so may affect the ants' health by allowing the parasite to spread. A different yeast species is grown by fungus-growing ants of the genus Cyphomyrmex.

Certain strains of some species of yeasts produce proteins called yeast killer toxins that allow them to eliminate competing strains. (See main article on killer yeast.) This can cause problems for winemaking but could potentially also be used to advantage by using killer toxin-producing strains to make the wine. Yeast killer toxins may also have medical applications in treating yeast infections (see "Pathogenic yeasts" section below).

Marine yeasts, defined as the yeasts that are isolated from marine environments, are able to grow better on a medium prepared using seawater rather than freshwater. The first marine yeasts were isolated by Bernhard Fischer in 1894 from the Atlantic Ocean, and those were identified as Torula sp. and Mycoderma sp. Following this discovery, various other marine yeasts have been isolated from around the world from different sources, including seawater, seaweeds, marine fish and mammals. Among these isolates, some marine yeasts originated from terrestrial habitats (grouped as facultative marine yeast), which were brought to and survived in marine environments. The other marine yeasts were grouped as obligate or indigenous marine yeasts, which are confined to marine habitats. However, no sufficient evidence has been found to explain the indispensability of seawater for obligate marine yeasts. It has been reported that marine yeasts are able to produce many bioactive substances, such as amino acids, glucans, glutathione, toxins, enzymes, phytase, and vitamins with potential applications in the food, pharmaceutical, cosmetic, and chemical industries as well as for marine culture and environmental protection. Marine yeast was successfully used to produce bioethanol using seawater-based media which will potentially reduce the water footprint of bioethanol.

== Reproduction ==
The yeast cell's life cycle: 1. Budding; 2. Conjugation; 3. Spore

Yeasts, like all fungi, may have asexual and sexual reproductive cycles. The most common mode of vegetative growth in yeast is asexual reproduction by budding, where a small bud (also known as a bleb or daughter cell) is formed on the parent cell. The nucleus of the parent cell splits, producing a daughter nucleus that migrates into the daughter cell. The bud then continues to grow until it separates from the parent cell, forming a new cell. The daughter cell produced during the budding process is generally smaller than the mother cell. Some yeasts, including Schizosaccharomyces pombe, reproduce by fission instead of budding, and thereby creating two identically sized daughter cells.

In general, under high-stress conditions such as nutrient starvation, haploid cells will die; under the same conditions, however, diploid cells can undergo sporulation, entering sexual reproduction (meiosis) and producing a variety of haploid spores, which can go on to mate (conjugate), reforming the diploid.

The haploid fission yeast Schizosaccharomyces pombe is a facultative sexual microorganism that can undergo mating when nutrients are limited. Exposure of S. pombe to hydrogen peroxide, an agent that causes oxidative stress leading to oxidative DNA damage, strongly induces mating and the formation of meiotic spores. The budding yeast Saccharomyces cerevisiae reproduces by mitosis as diploid cells when nutrients are abundant, but when starved, this yeast undergoes meiosis to form haploid spores. Haploid cells may then reproduce asexually by mitosis. Katz Ezov et al. presented evidence that in natural S. cerevisiae populations clonal reproduction and selfing (in the form of intratetrad mating) predominate. In nature, the mating of haploid cells to form diploid cells is most often between members of the same clonal population and out-crossing is uncommon. Analysis of the ancestry of natural S. cerevisiae strains led to the conclusion that out-crossing occurs only about once every 50,000 cell divisions. These observations suggest that the possible long-term benefits of outcrossing (e.g. generation of diversity) are likely to be insufficient for generally maintaining sex from one generation to the next. Rather, a short-term benefit, such as recombinational repair during meiosis, may be the key to the maintenance of sex in S. cerevisiae.

Some pucciniomycete yeasts, in particular species of Sporidiobolus and Sporobolomyces, produce aerially dispersed, asexual ballistoconidia.

== Uses ==
The useful physiological properties of yeast have led to their use in the field of biotechnology. Fermentation of sugars by yeast is the oldest and largest application of this technology. Many types of yeasts are used for making many foods: baker's yeast in bread production, brewer's yeast in beer fermentation, and yeast in wine fermentation and for xylitol production. So-called red rice yeast is actually a mold, Monascus purpureus. Yeasts include some of the most widely used model organisms for genetics and cell biology.

=== Alcoholic beverages ===
Alcoholic beverages are defined as beverages that contain ethanol (C_{2}H_{5}OH). This ethanol is almost always produced by fermentation – the metabolism of carbohydrates by certain species of yeasts under anaerobic or low-oxygen conditions. Beverages such as mead, wine, beer, or distilled spirits all use yeast at some stage of their production. A distilled beverage is a beverage containing ethanol that has been purified by distillation. Carbohydrate-containing plant material is fermented by yeast, producing a dilute solution of ethanol in the process. Spirits such as whiskey and rum are prepared by distilling these dilute solutions of ethanol. Components other than ethanol are collected in the condensate, including water, esters, and other alcohols, which (in addition to that provided by the oak in which it may be aged) account for the flavour of the beverage.

==== Beer ====
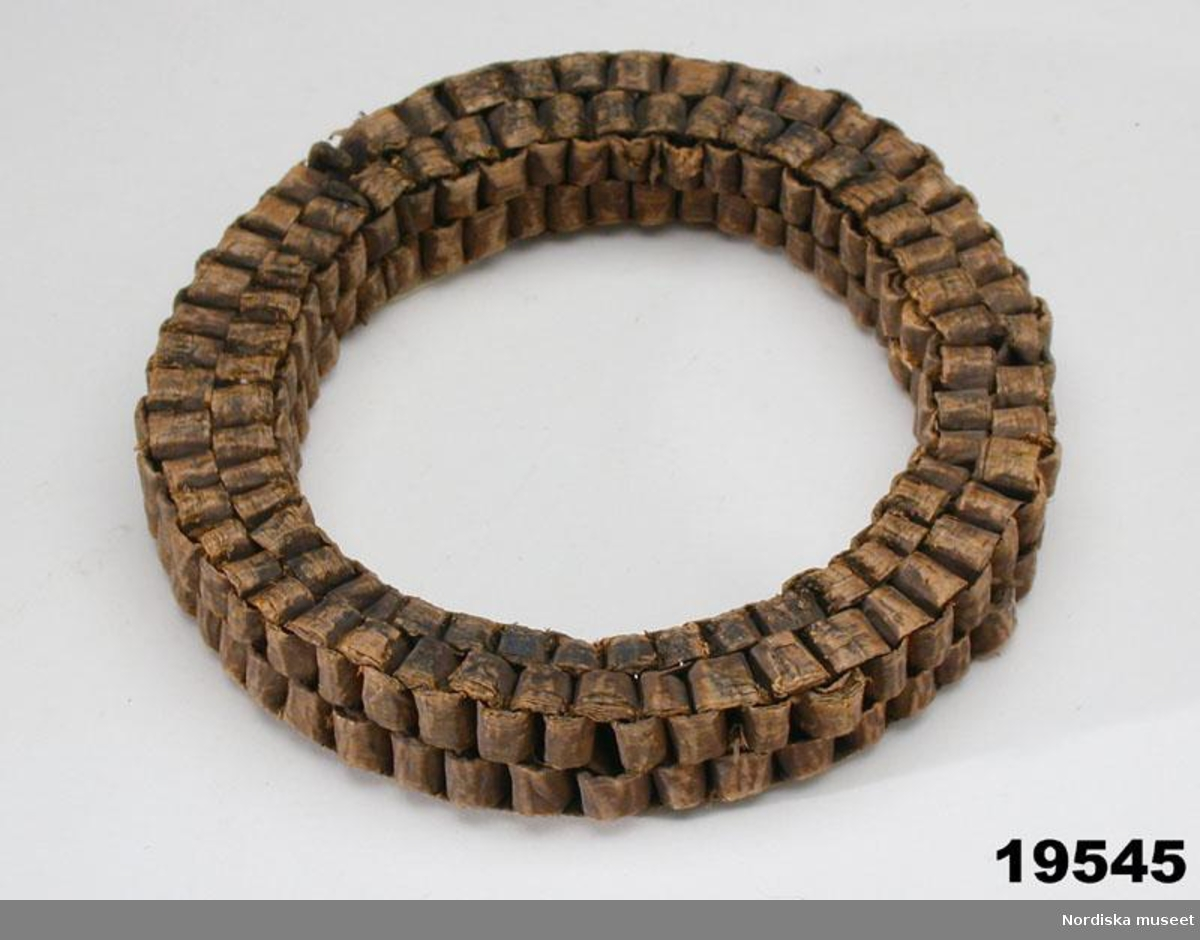
Yeast ring used by Swedish farmhouse brewers in the 19th century to preserve yeast between brewing sessions

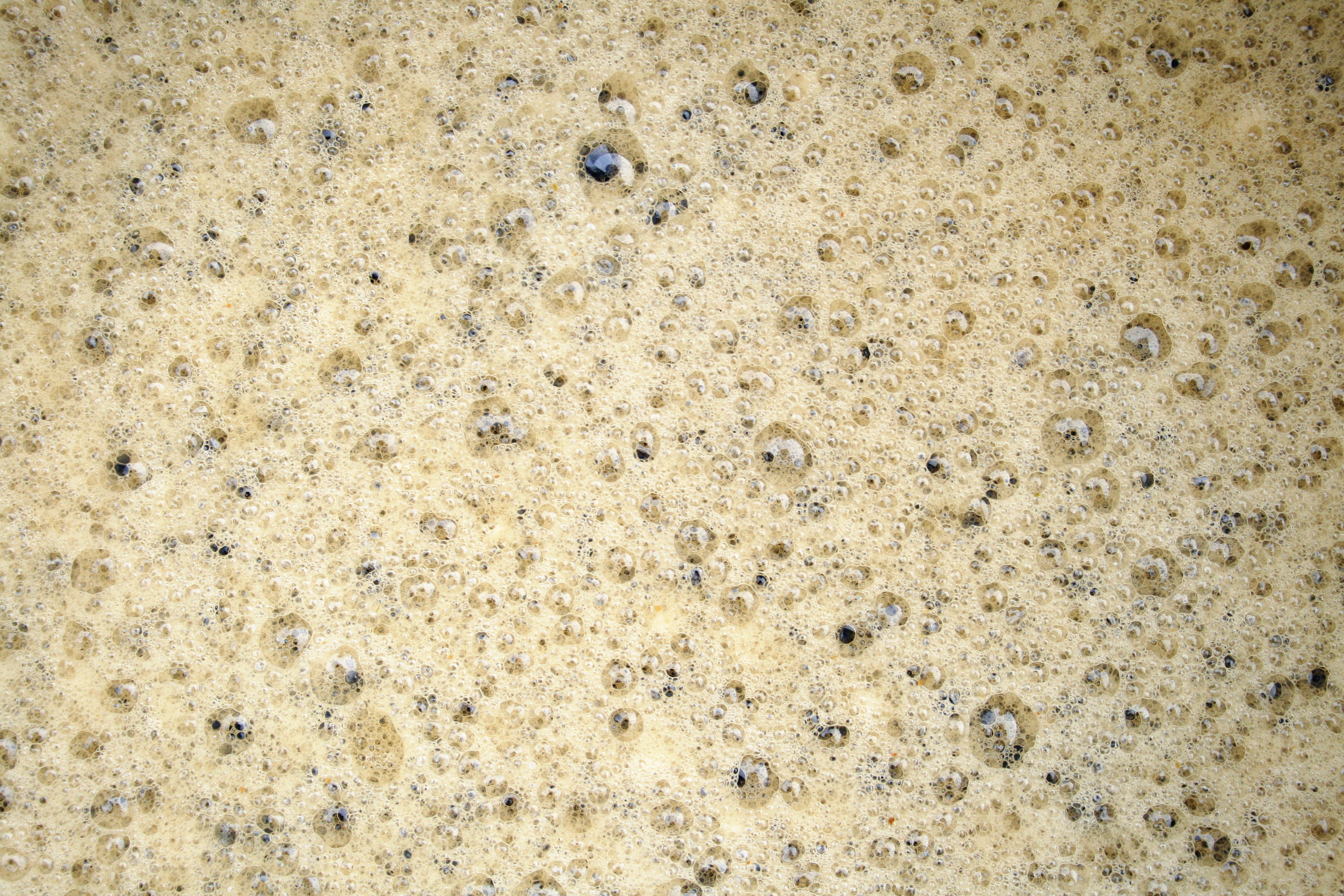
Bubbles of carbon dioxide forming during beer-brewing

Brewing yeasts may be classed as "top-cropping" (or "top-fermenting") and "bottom-cropping" (or "bottom-fermenting"). Top-cropping yeasts are so called because they form a foam at the top of the wort during fermentation. An example of a top-cropping yeast is Saccharomyces cerevisiae, sometimes called an "ale yeast". Bottom-cropping yeasts are typically used to produce lager-type beers, though they can also produce ale-type beers. These yeasts ferment well at low temperatures. An example of bottom-cropping yeast is Saccharomyces pastorianus, formerly known as S. carlsbergensis.

Decades ago, taxonomists reclassified S. carlsbergensis (uvarum) as a member of S. cerevisiae, noting that the only distinct difference between the two is metabolic. Lager strains of Saccharomyces secrete an enzyme called melibiase, allowing them to hydrolyse melibiose, a disaccharide, into more fermentable monosaccharides. Top- and bottom-cropping and cold- and warm-fermenting distinctions are largely generalizations used by laypersons to communicate to the general public.

The most common top-cropping brewer's yeast, S. cerevisiae, is the same species as the common baking yeast. Brewer's yeast is also very rich in essential minerals and the B vitamins (except B_{12}), a feature exploited in food products made from leftover (by-product) yeast from brewing. However, baking and brewing yeasts typically belong to different strains, cultivated to favour different characteristics: baking yeast strains are more aggressive, to carbonate dough in the shortest amount of time possible; brewing yeast strains act more slowly but tend to produce fewer off-flavours and tolerate higher alcohol concentrations (with some strains, up to 22%).

Dekkera/Brettanomyces is a genus of yeast known for its important role in the production of 'lambic' and specialty sour ales, along with the secondary conditioning of a particular Belgian Trappist beer. The taxonomy of the genus Brettanomyces has been debated since its early discovery and has seen many reclassifications over the years. Early classification was based on a few species that reproduced asexually (anamorph form) through multipolar budding. Shortly after, the formation of ascospores was observed and the genus Dekkera, which reproduces sexually (teleomorph form), was introduced as part of the taxonomy. The current taxonomy includes five species within the genera of Dekkera/Brettanomyces. Those are the anamorphs Brettanomyces bruxellensis, Brettanomyces anomalus, Brettanomyces custersianus, Brettanomyces naardenensis, and Brettanomyces nanus, with teleomorphs existing for the first two species, Dekkera bruxellensis and Dekkera anomala. The distinction between Dekkera and Brettanomyces is arguable, with Oelofse et al. (2008) citing Loureiro and Malfeito-Ferreira from 2006 when they affirmed that current molecular DNA detection techniques have uncovered no variance between the anamorph and teleomorph states. Over the past decade, Brettanomyces spp. have seen an increasing use in the craft-brewing sector of the industry, with a handful of breweries having produced beers that were primarily fermented with pure cultures of Brettanomyces spp. This has occurred out of experimentation, as very little information exists regarding pure culture fermentative capabilities and the aromatic compounds produced by various strains. Dekkera/Brettanomyces spp. have been the subjects of numerous studies conducted over the past century, although a majority of the recent research has focused on enhancing the knowledge of the wine industry. Recent research on eight Brettanomyces strains available in the brewing industry focused on strain-specific fermentations and identified the major compounds produced during pure culture anaerobic fermentation in wort.

==== Wine ====
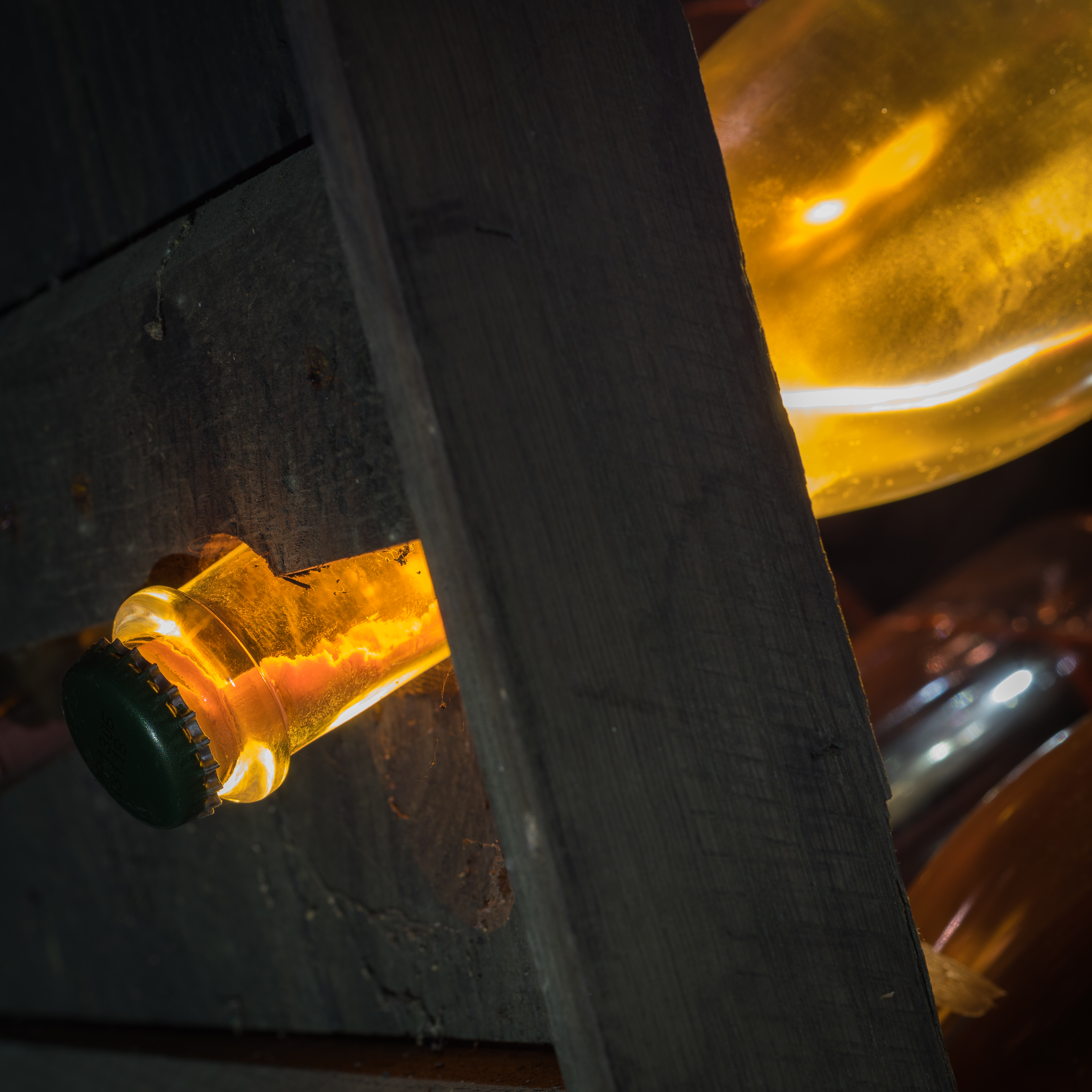
Yeast in a bottle during sparkling wine production at Schramsberg Vineyards, Napa

Yeast is used in winemaking, where it converts the sugars present (glucose and fructose) in grape juice (must) into ethanol. Yeast is normally already present on grape skins. Fermentation can be done with this endogenous "wild yeast", but this procedure gives unpredictable results, which depend upon the exact types of yeast species present. For this reason, a pure yeast culture is usually added to the must; this yeast quickly dominates the fermentation. The wild yeasts are repressed, which ensures a reliable and predictable fermentation.

Most added wine yeasts are strains of S. cerevisiae, though not all strains of the species are suitable. Different S. cerevisiae yeast strains have differing physiological and fermentative properties, therefore the actual strain of yeast selected can have a direct impact on the finished wine. Significant research has been undertaken into the development of novel wine yeast strains that produce atypical flavour profiles or increased complexity in wines.

The growth of some yeasts, such as Zygosaccharomyces and Brettanomyces, in wine can result in wine faults and subsequent spoilage. Brettanomyces produces an array of metabolites when growing in wine, some of which are volatile phenolic compounds. Together, these compounds are often referred to as "Brettanomyces character", and are often described as "antiseptic" or "barnyard" type aromas. Brettanomyces is a significant contributor to wine faults within the wine industry.

Researchers from the University of British Columbia, Canada, have found a new strain of yeast that has reduced amines. The amines in red wine and Chardonnay produce off-flavors and cause headaches and hypertension in some people. About 30% of people are sensitive to biogenic amines, such as histamines.

=== Baking ===
Yeast, most commonly S. cerevisiae, is used in baking as a leavening agent, converting the fermentable sugars present in dough into carbon dioxide. This causes the dough to expand or rise as gas forms pockets or bubbles. When the dough is baked, the yeast dies and the air pockets "set", giving the baked product a soft and spongy texture. The use of potatoes, water from potato boiling, eggs, or sugar in a bread dough accelerates the growth of yeast. Most yeasts used in baking are of the same species common in alcoholic fermentation. In addition, Saccharomyces exiguus (also known as S. minor), a wild yeast found on plants, fruits, and grains, is occasionally used for baking. In breadmaking, the yeast initially respires aerobically, producing carbon dioxide and water. When the oxygen is depleted, fermentation begins, producing ethanol as a waste product; however, this evaporates during baking.

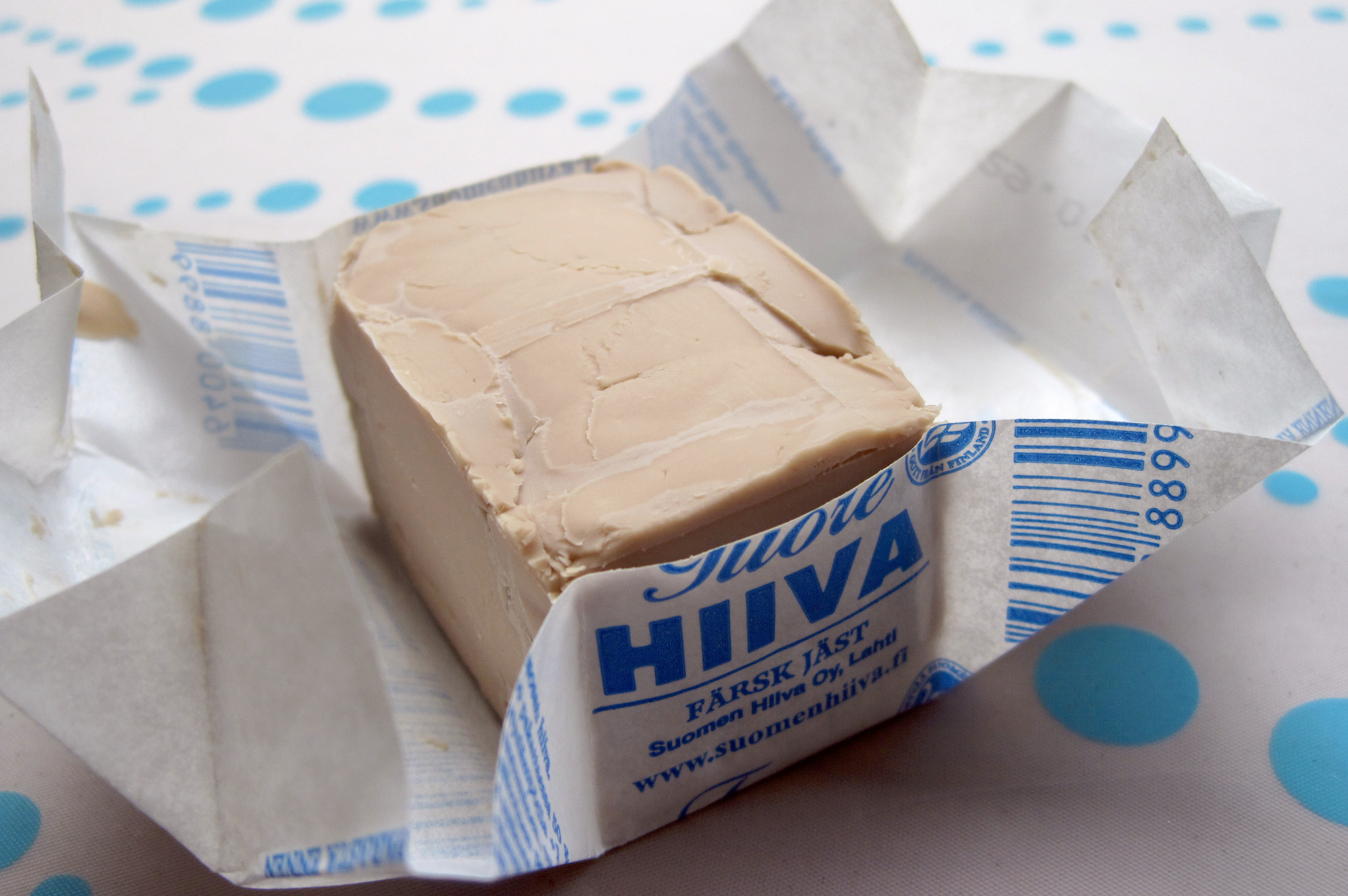
A block of compressed fresh yeast

It is not known when yeast was first used to bake bread. The first records that show this use came from Ancient Egypt. Researchers speculate a mixture of flour meal and water was left longer than usual on a warm day and the yeasts that occur in natural contaminants of the flour caused it to ferment before baking. The resulting bread would have been lighter and tastier than the normal flat, hard cake.

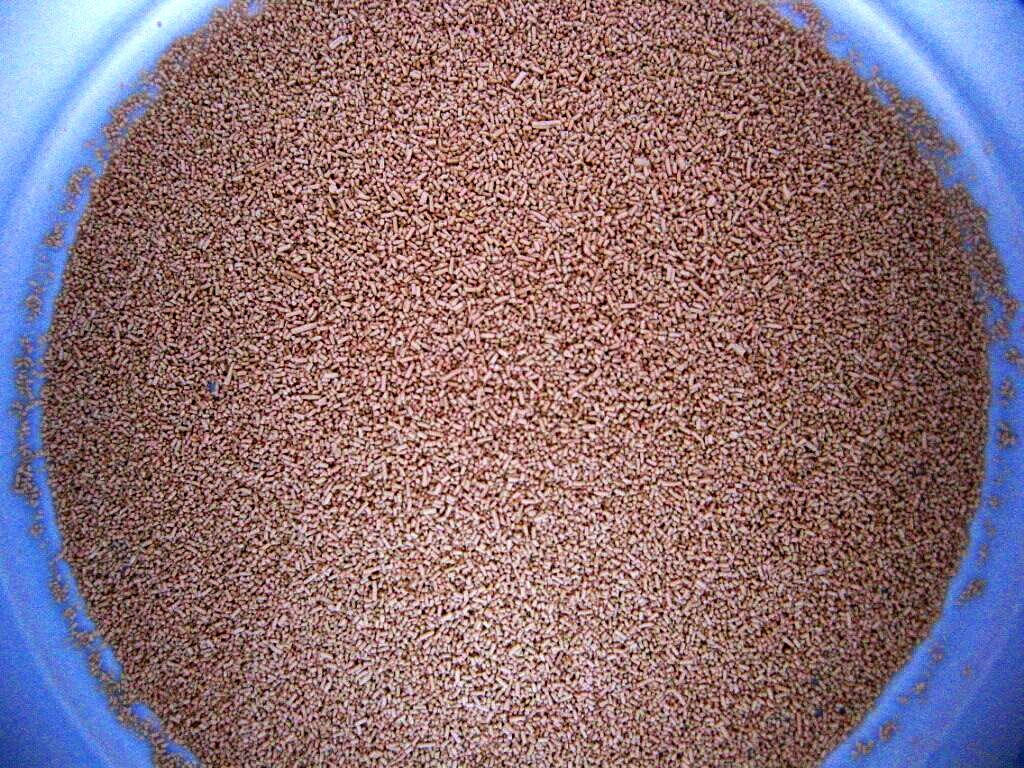
Active dried yeast, a granulated form in which yeast is commercially sold

Today, there are several retailers of baker's yeast; one of the earlier developments in North America is Fleischmann's Yeast, in 1868. During World War II, Fleischmann's developed a granulated active dry yeast which did not require refrigeration, had a longer shelf life than fresh yeast, and rose twice as fast. Baker's yeast is also sold as a fresh yeast compressed into a square "cake". This form perishes quickly, so must be used soon after production. A weak solution of water and sugar can be used to determine whether yeast is expired. In the solution, active yeast will foam and bubble as it ferments the sugar into ethanol and carbon dioxide. Some recipes refer to this as proofing the yeast, as it "proves" (tests) the viability of the yeast before the other ingredients are added. When a sourdough starter is used, flour and water are added instead of sugar; this is referred to as proofing the sponge.

When yeast is used for making bread, it is mixed with flour, salt, and warm water or milk. The dough is kneaded until it is smooth, and then left to rise, sometimes until it has doubled in size. The dough is then shaped into loaves. Some bread doughs are knocked back after one rising and left to rise again (this is called dough proofing) and then baked. A longer rising time gives a better flavor, but the yeast can fail to raise the bread in the final stages if it is left for too long initially.

=== Bioremediation ===
Some yeasts can find potential application in the field of bioremediation. One such yeast, Yarrowia lipolytica, is known to degrade palm oil mill effluent, TNT (an explosive material), and other hydrocarbons, such as alkanes, fatty acids, fats and oils. It can also tolerate high concentrations of salt and heavy metals, and is being investigated for its potential as a heavy metal biosorbent. Saccharomyces cerevisiae has potential to bioremediate toxic pollutants like arsenic from industrial effluent. Bronze statues are known to be degraded by certain species of yeast. Different yeasts from Brazilian gold mines bioaccumulate free and complexed silver ions.

=== Industrial ethanol production ===
The ability of yeast to convert sugar into ethanol has been harnessed by the biotechnology industry to produce ethanol fuel. The process starts by milling a feedstock, such as sugar cane, field corn, or other cereal grains, and then adding dilute sulfuric acid, or fungal alpha amylase enzymes, to break down the starches into complex sugars. A glucoamylase is then added to break the complex sugars down into simple sugars. After this, yeasts are added to convert the simple sugars to ethanol, which is then distilled off to obtain ethanol up to 96% in purity.

Saccharomyces yeasts have been genetically engineered to ferment xylose, one of the major fermentable sugars present in cellulosic biomasses, such as agriculture residues, paper wastes, and wood chips. Such a development means ethanol can be efficiently produced from more inexpensive feedstocks, making cellulosic ethanol fuel a more competitively priced alternative to gasoline fuels.

=== Nonalcoholic beverages ===
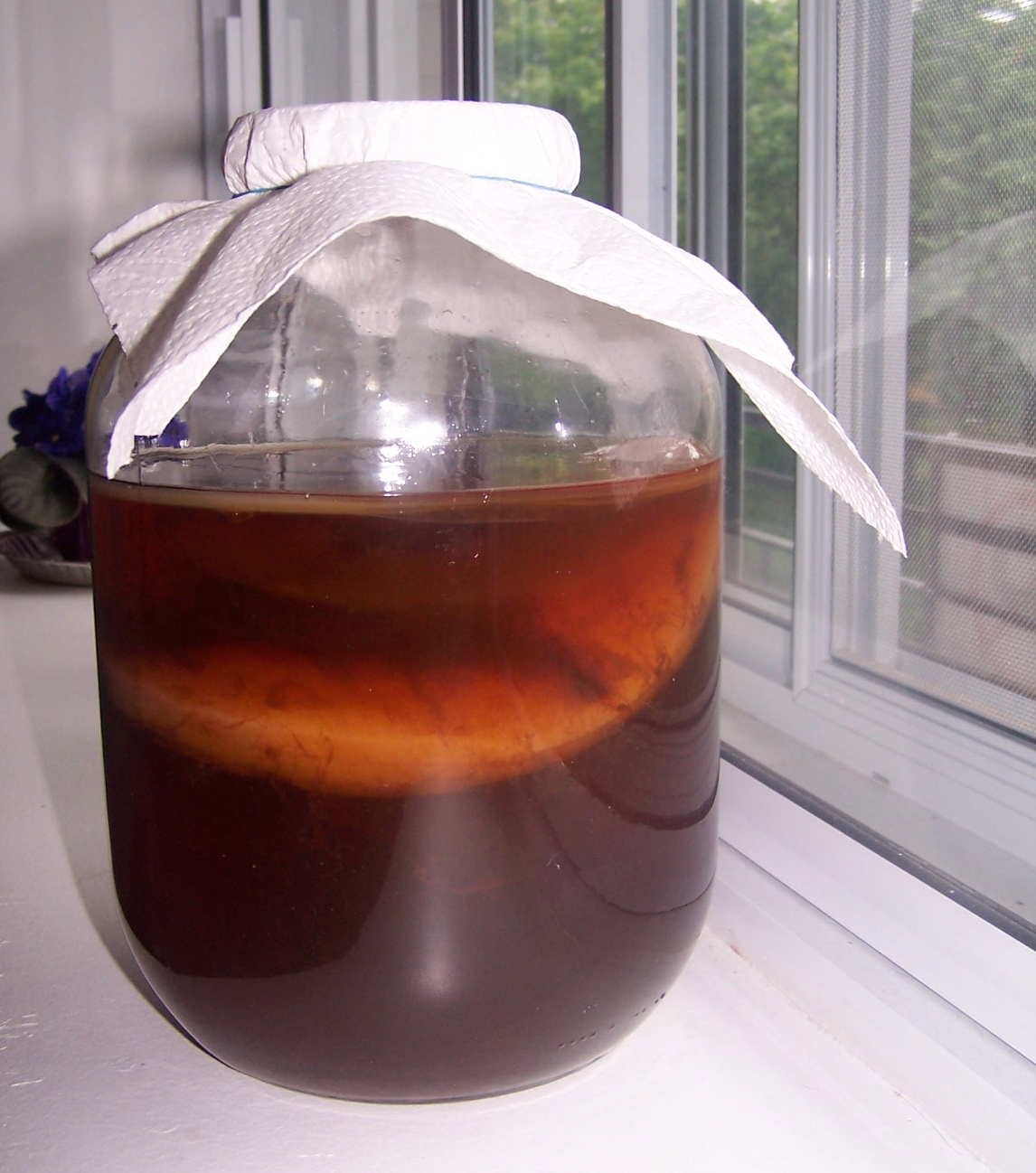
A kombucha culture fermenting in a jar

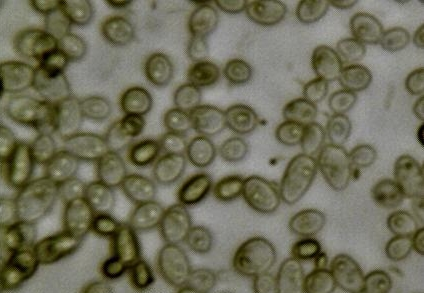
Yeast and bacteria in kombucha at 400×

A number of sweet carbonated beverages can be produced by the same methods as beer, except the fermentation is stopped sooner, producing carbon dioxide, but only trace amounts of alcohol, leaving a significant amount of residual sugar in the drink.

- Root beer, originally made by Native Americans, commercialized in the United States by Charles Elmer Hires and especially popular during Prohibition
- Kvass, a fermented drink made from rye, popular in Eastern Europe. It has a recognizable, but low alcoholic content.
- Kombucha, a fermented sweetened tea. Yeast in symbiosis with acetic acid bacteria is used in its preparation. Species of yeasts found in the tea can vary, and may include: Brettanomyces bruxellensis, Candida stellata, Schizosaccharomyces pombe, Torulaspora delbrueckii and Zygosaccharomyces bailii. Also popular in Eastern Europe and some former Soviet republics under the name chajnyj grib (Russian: Чайный гриб), which means "tea mushroom".
- Kefir and kumis are made by fermenting milk with yeast and bacteria.
- Mauby (Spanish: mabí), made by fermenting sugar with the wild yeasts naturally present on the bark of the Colubrina elliptica tree, popular in the Caribbean

=== Foods and nutritional supplements ===
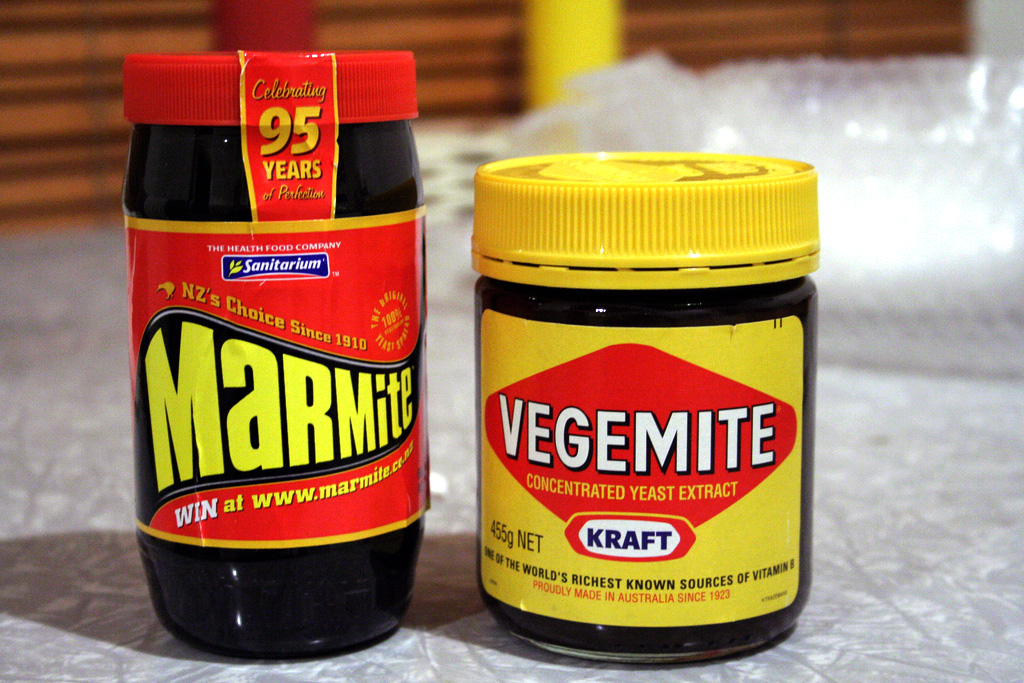
Marmite and Vegemite, products made from yeast extract

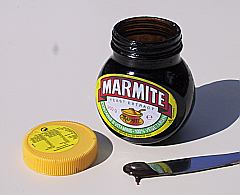
Marmite and Vegemite are dark in colour

Yeast is used as an ingredient in foods for its umami flavor, in much of the same way that monosodium glutamate (MSG) is used and, like MSG, yeast often contains free glutamic acid. Examples include:

- Yeast extract, made from the intracellular contents of yeast and used as food additives or flavours. The general method for making yeast extract for food products such as Vegemite and Marmite on a commercial scale is heat autolysis, i.e. to add salt to a suspension of yeast, making the solution hypertonic, which leads to the cells' shrivelling up. This triggers autolysis, wherein the yeast's digestive enzymes break their own proteins down into simpler compounds, a process of self-destruction. The dying yeast cells are then heated to complete their breakdown, after which the husks (yeast with thick cell walls that would give poor texture) are removed. Yeast autolysates are used in Vegemite and Promite (Australia); Marmite (the United Kingdom); the unrelated Marmite (New Zealand); Vitam-R (Germany); and Cenovis (Switzerland).
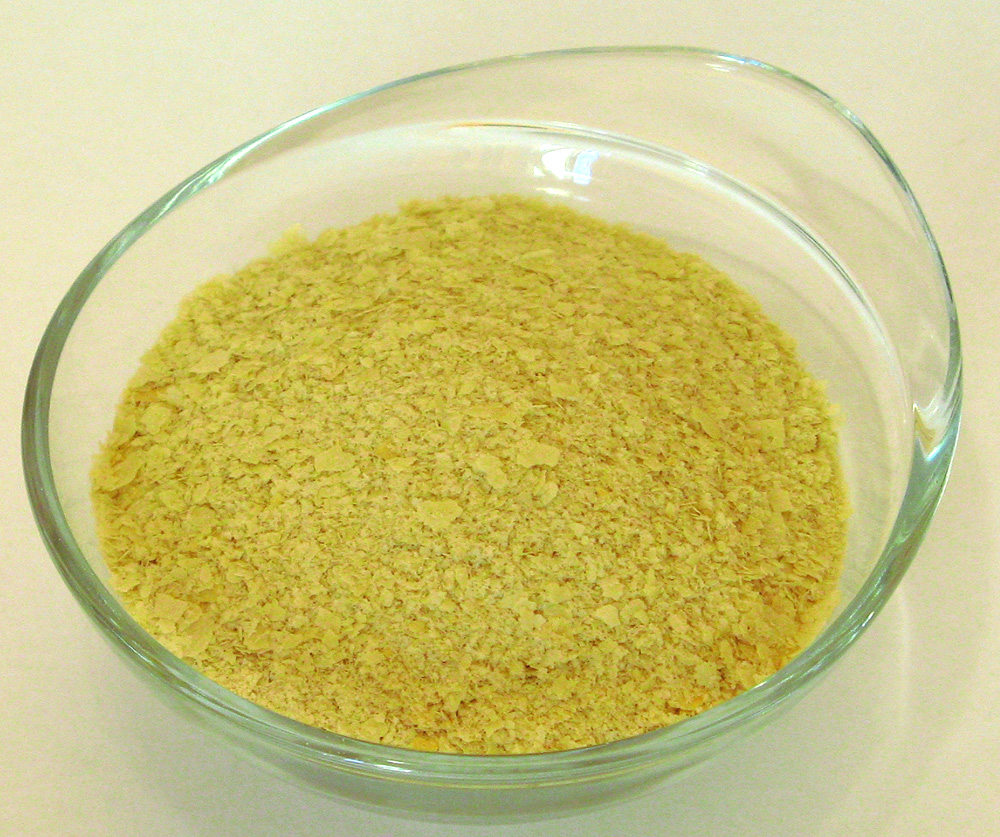
- Nutritional yeast flakes are yellow in colour
  Nutritional yeast, which is whole dried, deactivated yeast cells, usually S. cerevisiae. Usually in the form of yellow flake or powder, its nutty and umami flavor makes it a vegan substitute for cheese powder. Another popular use is as a topping for popcorn. It can also be used in mashed and fried potatoes, as well as in scrambled eggs. It comes in the form of flakes, or as a yellow powder similar in texture to cornmeal. In Australia, it is sometimes sold as "savoury yeast flakes".

Both types of yeast foods above are rich in B-complex vitamins (besides vitamin B_{12} unless fortified), making them an attractive nutritional supplement to vegans. The same vitamins are also found in some yeast-fermented products mentioned above, such as kvass. Nutritional yeast in particular is naturally low in fat and sodium and a source of protein and vitamins as well as other minerals and cofactors required for growth. Many brands of nutritional yeast and yeast extract spreads, though not all, are fortified with vitamin B_{12}, which is produced separately by bacteria.

In 1920, the Fleischmann Yeast Company began to promote yeast cakes in a "Yeast for Health" campaign. They initially emphasized yeast as a source of vitamins, good for skin and digestion. Their later advertising claimed a much broader range of health benefits, and was censured as misleading by the Federal Trade Commission. The fad for yeast cakes lasted until the late 1930s.

Yeast cell walls are used as a source of dietary fiber. Specifically, the glucan part is marketed as "yeast β-glucan" and the mannan part is further processed into mannan-oligosaccharide (MOS).

=== Probiotics ===
Some probiotic supplements use the yeast S. boulardii to maintain and restore the natural flora in the gastrointestinal tract. S. boulardii has been shown to reduce the symptoms of acute diarrhea, reduce the chance of infection by Clostridium difficile (often identified simply as C. difficile or C. diff), reduce bowel movements in diarrhea-predominant IBS patients, and reduce the incidence of antibiotic-, traveler's-, and HIV/AIDS-associated diarrheas.

=== Aquarium hobby ===
Yeast is often used by aquarium hobbyists to generate carbon dioxide (CO_{2}) to nourish plants in planted aquaria. CO_{2} levels from yeast are more difficult to regulate than those from pressurized CO_{2} systems. However, the low cost of yeast makes it a widely used alternative.

=== Scientific research ===
Diagram showing a yeast cell

Several yeasts, in particular S. cerevisiae and S. pombe, have been widely used in genetics and cell biology, largely because they are simple eukaryotic cells, serving as a model for all eukaryotes, including humans, for the study of fundamental cellular processes such as the cell cycle, DNA replication, recombination, cell division, and metabolism. Also, yeasts are easily manipulated and cultured in the laboratory, which has allowed for the development of powerful standard techniques, such as yeast two-hybrid, synthetic genetic array analysis, and tetrad analysis. Many proteins important in human biology were first discovered by studying their homologues in yeast; these proteins include cell cycle proteins, signaling proteins, and protein-processing enzymes.

On 24 April 1996, S. cerevisiae was announced to be the first eukaryote to have its genome, consisting of 12 million base pairs, fully sequenced as part of the Genome Project. At the time, it was the most complex organism to have its full genome sequenced, and the work of seven years and the involvement of more than 100 laboratories to accomplish. The second yeast species to have its genome sequenced was Schizosaccharomyces pombe, which was completed in 2002. It was the sixth eukaryotic genome sequenced and consists of 13.8 million base pairs. As of 2014, over 50 yeast species have had their genomes sequenced and published.

Genomic and functional gene annotation of the two major yeast models can be accessed via their respective model organism databases: SGD and PomBase.

=== Genetically engineered biofactories ===
Various yeast species have been genetically engineered to efficiently produce various drugs, a technique called metabolic engineering. S. cerevisiae is easy to genetically engineer; its physiology, metabolism and genetics are well known, and it is amenable for use in harsh industrial conditions. A wide variety of chemical in different classes can be produced by engineered yeast, including phenolics, isoprenoids, alkaloids, and polyketides. About 20% of biopharmaceuticals are produced in S. cerevisiae, including insulin, vaccines for hepatitis, and human serum albumin.

== Pathogenic yeasts ==
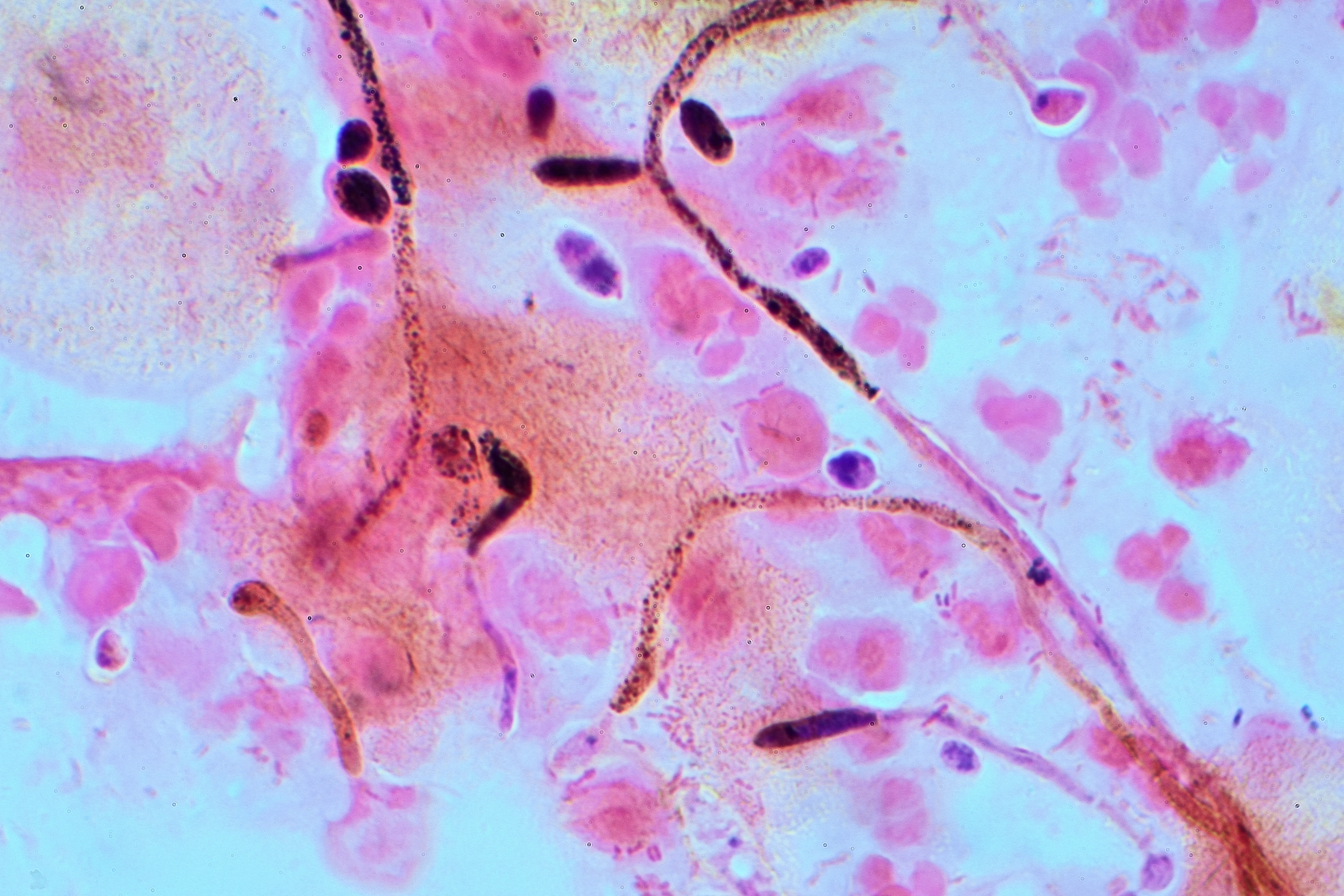
Gram stain of Candida albicans from a vaginal swab. The small oval chlamydospores are 2–4 μm in diameter.

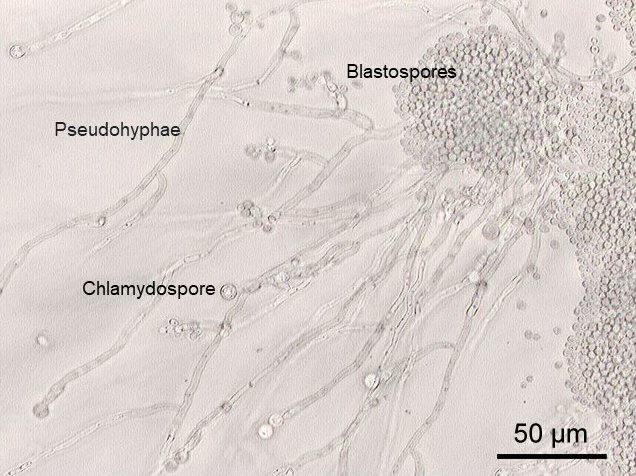
A photomicrograph of Candida albicans showing hyphal outgrowth and other morphological characteristics

Some species of yeast are opportunistic pathogens that can cause infection in people with compromised immune systems. Cryptococcus neoformans and Cryptococcus gattii are significant pathogens of immunocompromised people. They are the species primarily responsible for cryptococcosis, a fungal infection that occurs in about one million HIV/AIDS patients, causing over 600,000 deaths annually. The cells of these yeast are surrounded by a rigid polysaccharide capsule, which helps to prevent them from being recognised and engulfed by white blood cells in the human body.

Yeasts of the genus Candida, another group of opportunistic pathogens, cause oral and vaginal infections in humans, known as candidiasis. Candida is commonly found as a commensal yeast in the mucous membranes of humans and other warm-blooded animals. However, sometimes these same strains can become pathogenic. The yeast cells sprout a hyphal outgrowth, which locally penetrates the mucosal membrane, causing irritation and shedding of the tissues. A book from the 1980s listed the pathogenic yeasts of candidiasis in probable descending order of virulence for humans as: C. albicans, C. tropicalis, C. stellatoidea, C. glabrata, C. krusei, C. parapsilosis, C. guilliermondii, C. viswanathii, C. lusitaniae, and Rhodotorula mucilaginosa. Candida glabrata is the second most common Candida pathogen after C. albicans, causing infections of the urogenital tract, and of the bloodstream (candidemia). C. auris has been more recently identified.

=== Dimorphic fungi ===
Some species of fungi live most of their life cycles as molds in soil, but upon entering a host animal, they transition to a yeast form, along with expression of virulence factors that convert them into effective and dangerous pathogens. These are known as dimorphic fungi and are typically capable of reproduction in the typical yeast fashion, including via budding. In these organisms, the yeast form transition is required for pathogenicity; if the transition is stopped somehow, the mold form does not cause disease. The rounded and separated forms of yeasts help them to spread through the bloodstream to organ systems. In some infections caused by dimorphic fungi, such as emergomycosis, respiratory symptoms are uncommon, even though the fungus initially enters through the lungs.

Most molds are not dimorphic, and only a very small number of species cause dimorphic fungal disease in humans.

== Food spoilage ==
Yeasts are able to grow in foods with a low pH (5.0 or lower) and in the presence of sugars, organic acids, and other easily metabolized carbon sources. During their growth, yeasts metabolize some food components and produce metabolic end products. This causes the physical, chemical, and sensible properties of a food to change, and the food is spoiled. The growth of yeast within food products is often seen on their surfaces, as in cheeses or meats, or by the fermentation of sugars in beverages, such as juices, and semiliquid products, such as syrups and jams. The yeast of the genus Zygosaccharomyces have had a long history as spoilage yeasts within the food industry. This is mainly because these species can grow in the presence of high sucrose, ethanol, acetic acid, sorbic acid, benzoic acid, and sulfur dioxide concentrations, representing some of the commonly used food preservation methods. Methylene blue is used to test for the presence of live yeast cells. In oenology, the major spoilage yeast is Brettanomyces bruxellensis.

Candida blankii has been detected in Iberian ham and meat.

== Symbiosis ==
An Indian study of seven bee species and nine plant species found 45 yeast species from 16 genera colonise the nectaries of flowers and honey stomachs of bees. Most were members of the genus Candida; the most common species in honey bee stomachs was Dekkera intermedia, while the most common species colonising flower nectaries was Candida blankii. Although the mechanism is not fully understood, it was found that A. indica flowers more if Candida blankii is present.

In another example, Spathaspora passalidarum, found in the digestive tract of bess beetles, aids the digestion of plant cells by fermenting xylose.

Many fruits produce different types of sugars that attract yeasts, which ferment the sugar and turns it into alcohol. Fruit eating mammals find the scent of alcohol attractive as it indicates a ripe, sugary fruit which provides more nutrition. In turn, the mammals helps disperse both the fruit's seeds and the yeast's spores.

Yeast and small hive beetle have mutualistic relationship. While small hive beetle is attracted by the pheromone released by the host honeybee, yeast can produce a similar pheromone which have the same attractive effect to the small hive beetle. Therefore, yeast facilitates SHB's infestation if the beehive contains yeast inside.

== See also ==
- Baker's yeast
- Bioaerosol
- Ethanol fermentation
- Evolution of aerobic fermentation
- Kazachstania yasuniensis – a yeast isolated in 2015
- Mycosis (fungal infection in animals)
- Start point (yeast)
- WHI3
- Yeast plasmids
- Zymology
