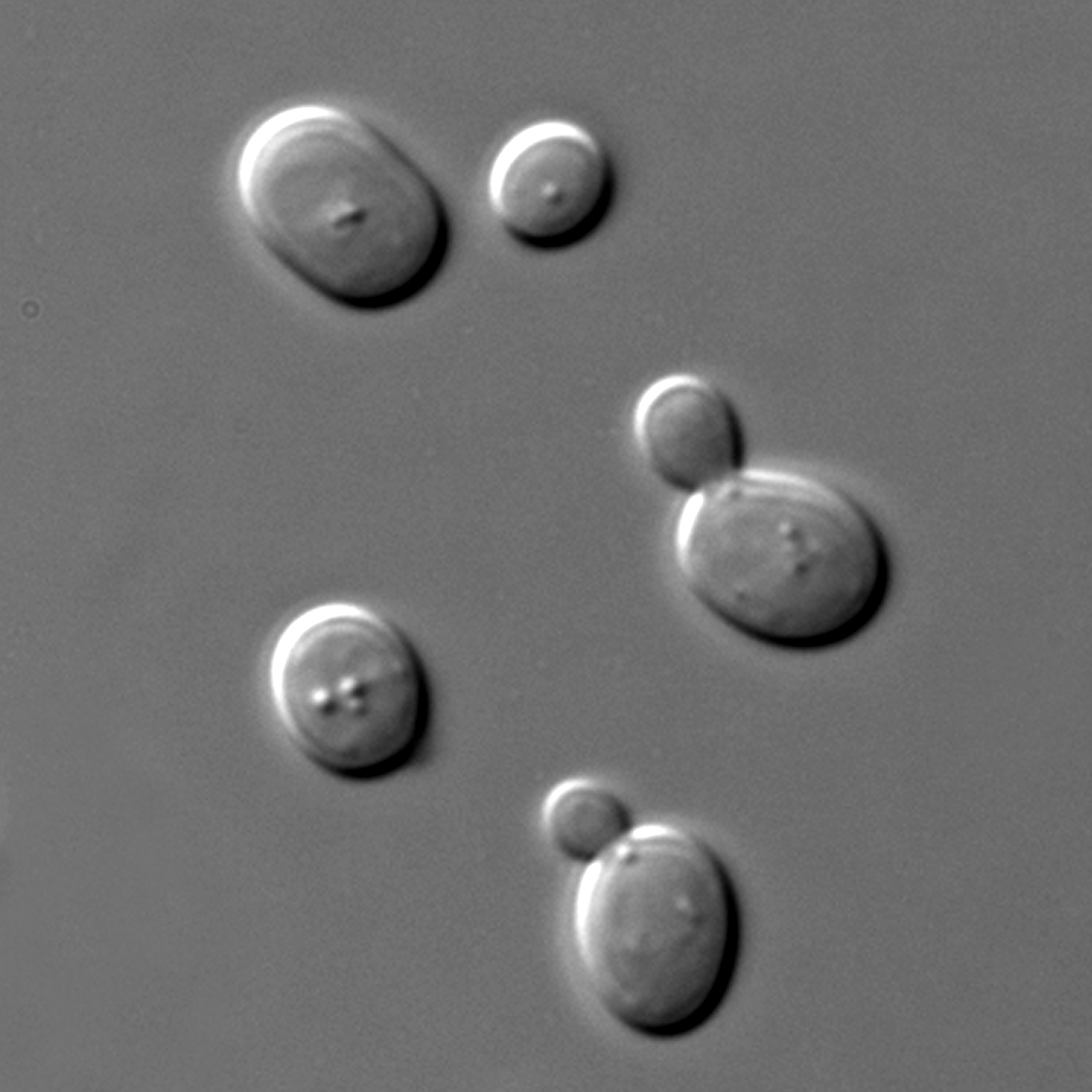
- Saccharomyces cerevisiae under DIC microscopy

Scientific classification
- Kingdom: Fungi
- Division: Ascomycota
- Subdivision: Saccharomycotina
- Class: Saccharomycetes
- Order: Saccharomycetales
- Family: Saccharomycetaceae; G.Winter (1881)

Type genus
- Saccharomyces Meyen ex E.C.Hansen (1883)

= Saccharomycetaceae =

Family of fungi

The Saccharomycetaceae are a family of yeasts in the order Saccharomycetales that reproduce by budding. Species in the family have a cosmopolitan distribution, and are present in a wide variety of habitats, especially those with a plentiful supply of carbohydrate sources. The family contains the species Saccharomyces cerevisiae, perhaps the most economically important fungus.

== Genera ==
The 2023 phylogenomic classification lists

- Cyniclomyces
- Eremothecium/Ashbya
- Grigorovia
- Hagleromyces
- Kazachstania (see Kazachstania)
- Kluyveromyces
- Lachancea
- Nakaseomyces
- Naumovozyma
- Saccharomyces
- Savitreea
- Tetrapisispora
- Torulaspora
- Vanderwaltozyma
- Yueomyces
- Zygosaccharomyces
- Zygotorulaspora

According to the 2007 Outline of Ascomycota, 20 genera are within the family, although for several of these (marked with a question mark below), the placement is uncertain and requires more study.

Brettanomyces: to Pichiaceae in '23
Candida: to Debaryomycetaceae
?Citeromyces: to Pichiaceae in '23
?Cyniclomyces
?Debaryomyces: to Debaryomycetaceae in '23
?Issatchenkia: not in '23
Kazachstania (synonymous with Arxiozyma)
Kluyveromyces
Komagataella: to Pichiaceae in '23
Kuraishia: to Pichiaceae in '23
Lachancea
?Lodderomyces: to Debaryomycetaceae in '23
Nakaseomyces
?Pachysolen: to Pachysolenaceae in '23
Pichia: to Pichiaceae in '23
Saccharomyces
Spathaspora: to Debaryomycetaceae in '23
Tetrapisispora
Vanderwaltozyma
Torulaspora
?Williopsis: not in '23
Zygosaccharomyces
Zygotorulaspora

Species Fungorum also has Schwanniomyces in the family.
