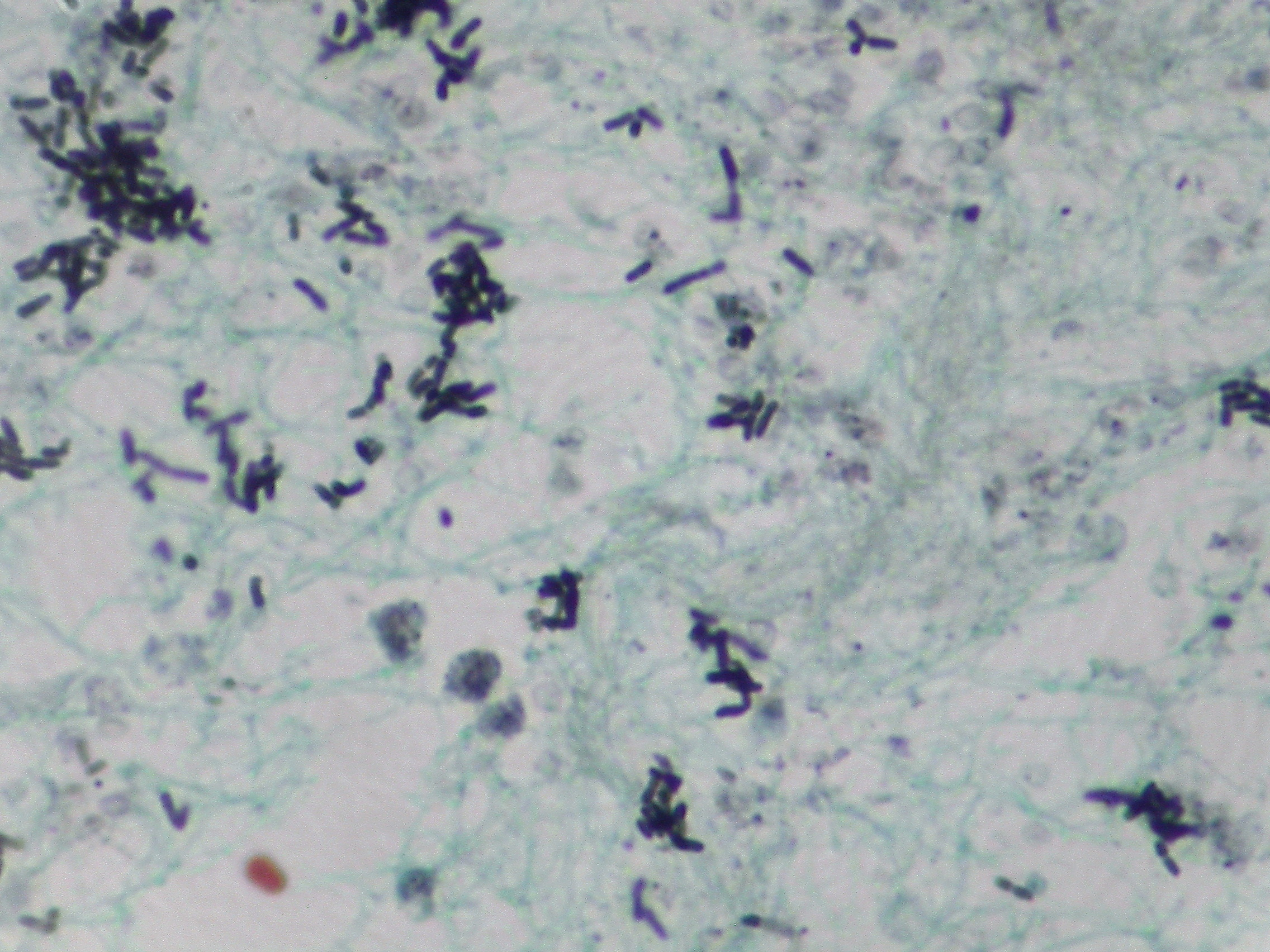
- Geotrichum candidum reproduces by segmentation of hyphae into arthrospores with straight or rounded ends as seen here with the GMS stain.

Scientific classification
- Kingdom: Fungi
- Division: Ascomycota
- Class: Saccharomycetes
- Order: Saccharomycetales
- Family: Endomycetaceae; J. Schröt., 1893

Type genus
- Endomyces Reess

Genera
- Ascocephalophora; Endomyces; Kloeckera/Hanseniaspora; Geotrichum; Phialoascus; Trichomonascus

= Endomycetaceae =

Family of fungi

The Endomycetaceae are a family of yeasts in the order Saccharomycetales. According to the 2007 Outline of Ascomycota, the family contains three genera; however, the placement of the genus Phialoascus is uncertain. Species in this poorly understood family have cosmopolitan distributions, and typically grow in association with other fungi, perhaps parasitically.
