= Galactomyces =

Scientific classification
- Kingdom: Fungi
- Division: Ascomycota
- Class: Dipodascomycetes
- Order: Dipodascales
- Family: Dipodascaceae
- Genus: Galactomyces; Redhead & Malloch

Type species
- Galactomyces geotrichum (E.E. Butler & L.J. Petersen) Redhead & Malloch

Species
- See article

Genus of fungi

Galactomyces is a former genus of fungi in the family Dipodascaceae. It consisted of several species names for teleomorph states of species now mostly placed in the genus Geotrichum

== Taxonomy ==
The genus contained the species Galactomyces candidus, Galactomyces geotrichum, Galactomyces pseudocandidus, Galactomyces reessii and G. citri-aurantii, all now placed in Geotrichum, while the genus name itself is now considered a synonym to Dipodascus. As of 2026 Galactomyces britannicus has not yet been reassinged to an accepted genus.

== Applications ==
Galactomyces Ferment Filtrate is a nutrient dense yeast and a byproduct of fermented sake. In cosmetics, it is used as a moisturizing agent and has antioxidant effects. It improves the skin's moisture barrier, helping to protect the skin from environmental stress.

In a study submitted to the Asian Journal of Beauty and Cosmetology, researchers evaluated the effects of essence-formed cosmetic ingredients containing the galactomyces ferment filtrate on human skin improvements in keratinization, pores, sebum excretion, brightness, and acne. For analyzing the effects, twenty volunteers participated and each results was determined by using the essence containing 97% of galactomyces ferment filtrate on their faces in three times. The results showed that the number of the enlarged pores and blackheads on the volunteer's faces were significantly reduced more than 15.66 and 21.84% respectively by using the essence, as compared to the number of enlarged and clogged pores on the untreated control faces. Also, the amount of sebum and keratin in faces were meaningfully reduced by 64.17% and 16.47%, respectively. They further demonstrated that the levels of skin brightness were improved after treatment of the reagent by 2.49%. Moreover, the number of comedones were decreased 9.59%. Survey analysis showed that the volunteers had high personal satisfaction levels after using the reagents. Collectively, the results indicated that the galactomyces containing essence-formed cosmetics have an improved effect on facial skin.
