= Trichosporon austroamericanum =

Scientific classification
- Kingdom: Fungi
- Division: Basidiomycota
- Class: Tremellomycetes
- Order: Trichosporonales
- Family: Trichosporonaceae
- Genus: Trichosporon
- Species: T. austroamericanum

Binomial name
- Trichosporon austroamericanum Francisco et al., 2024

Species of yeast

Trichosporon austroamericanum is an anamorphic basidiomycetous yeast species with opportunistic pathogenic potential, formally described in 2024. It was long confused with Trichosporon inkin due to their close phylogenetic relationship, but is now recognized as the second most frequently implicated Trichosporon species in invasive trichosporonosis in France.

== Etymology ==
The species name austroamericanum derives from the Latin austro- ("southern") and americanum ("American"), referring to South America, where the first identified strain originated.

== History ==
=== Discovery ===
The first strain of T. austroamericanum was isolated in 2013 in Brazil from the urine of a 15-year-old renal transplant patient undergoing surgery for a urinary fistula. The isolate was initially identified as Trichosporon inkin due to strong phenotypic and molecular similarity between the two species.

=== Recognition as a distinct species ===
In 2024, Francisco et al. formally described T. austroamericanum as a new species based on detailed phylogenetic analysis. The historical confusion with T. inkin is explained by their genetic proximity, which makes differentiation difficult using routine molecular tools.

In 2025, the first complete genome sequencing of T. austroamericanum (type strain CBS 17435) was performed using long-read Nanopore sequencing technology. Average Nucleotide Identity (ANI) between T. austroamericanum and T. inkin was 84.64%, well below the 95% threshold commonly used for species delimitation, confirming that they are distinct species. These findings were supported by comparative genomic analysis of three Japanese clinical isolates.

== Description ==
=== Morphology ===
T. austroamericanum is an anamorphic (asexual) fungus that presents as a yeast. Like other species of Trichosporon, it produces arthroconidia through hyphal fragmentation. Its morphology is very similar to that of T. inkin, making differentiation difficult using conventional microscopic or macroscopic examination.

=== Differentiation from T. inkin ===
Differentiation relies mainly on molecular methods, including sequencing of the IGS1 (Intergenic Spacer 1) region and multilocus phylogenetic analysis. Phenotypic differences include thermotolerance (growth at 45 °C), absence of growth in media containing 50% glucose, and inability to utilize succinate or citrate.

== Ecology ==
The environmental reservoir of T. austroamericanum remains unknown. Like other Trichosporon species, it is part of the transient human microbiota and may colonize the skin and gastrointestinal tract without causing disease in immunocompetent individuals.

== Epidemiology ==
=== Global distribution ===
Strains of T. austroamericanum—initially misidentified as T. inkin—have been reported worldwide, suggesting a cosmopolitan distribution:

- Brazil (blood cultures)
- China (invasive infections)
- Thailand (urinary isolates)
- India (superficial mycoses)
- France and Argentina (various clinical cases)

=== Prevalence in France ===
A French study (2002–2022) found that T. austroamericanum accounted for 22.8% of Trichosporon isolates, making it the second most frequently identified species in the country.

Another study reidentified 17 isolates initially classified as T. inkin as T. austroamericanum using IGS1 sequencing.

== Clinical characteristics ==
=== At-risk populations ===
Invasive infections mainly occur in immunocompromised patients or those undergoing major surgery. In a French cohort (21 cases):

- 86.4% were male
- 36.4% had recent surgery
- 36.4% were solid organ transplant recipients

=== Clinical manifestations ===
Reported infection sites include:

- fungemia: 68.2%
- bone infections: 18.2%
- cutaneous infections: 4.5%

=== Prognosis ===
The 30-day mortality rate was 22.7% in the studied cohort.

=== European surgical context ===
A fatal case following heart transplantation has been reported, initially misidentified as T. inkin. Literature review highlights similar invasive infections after major thoracic surgeries in Europe.

Persistent fever in immunocompromised patients receiving echinocandin therapy may suggest infection with resistant Trichosporon species.

== Virulence factors ==
Identified virulence factors include:

- biofilm formation and protease production
- presence of a Zn(II)_{2}Cys_{6} transcription factor gene (also found in Trichosporon asahii)
- high virulence in Galleria mellonella models, comparable to T. asahii

== Diagnosis ==
Identification is challenging due to frequent confusion with T. inkin. Reliable methods include:

- IGS1 region sequencing (reference method)
- updated MALDI-TOF databases including reference spectra
- whole-genome sequencing (Nanopore), confirming species distinction via ANI

== Antifungal susceptibility ==
Antifungal susceptibility (EUCAST, 21 isolates):

Antifungal	MIC50 (mg/L)	MIC90 (mg/L)	Range (mg/L)
Voriconazole	0.03	0.06	<0.015–0.125
Posaconazole	0.06	0.25	<0.015–0.25
Amphotericin B	0.25	1	0.06–2
Flucytosine	>64	>64	64–>64
Fluconazole	0.5	4	0.25–4

T. austroamericanum is intrinsically resistant to echinocandins. New-generation triazoles (voriconazole, posaconazole, isavuconazole) show the best in vitro activity.

Voriconazole is the recommended first-line treatment.
