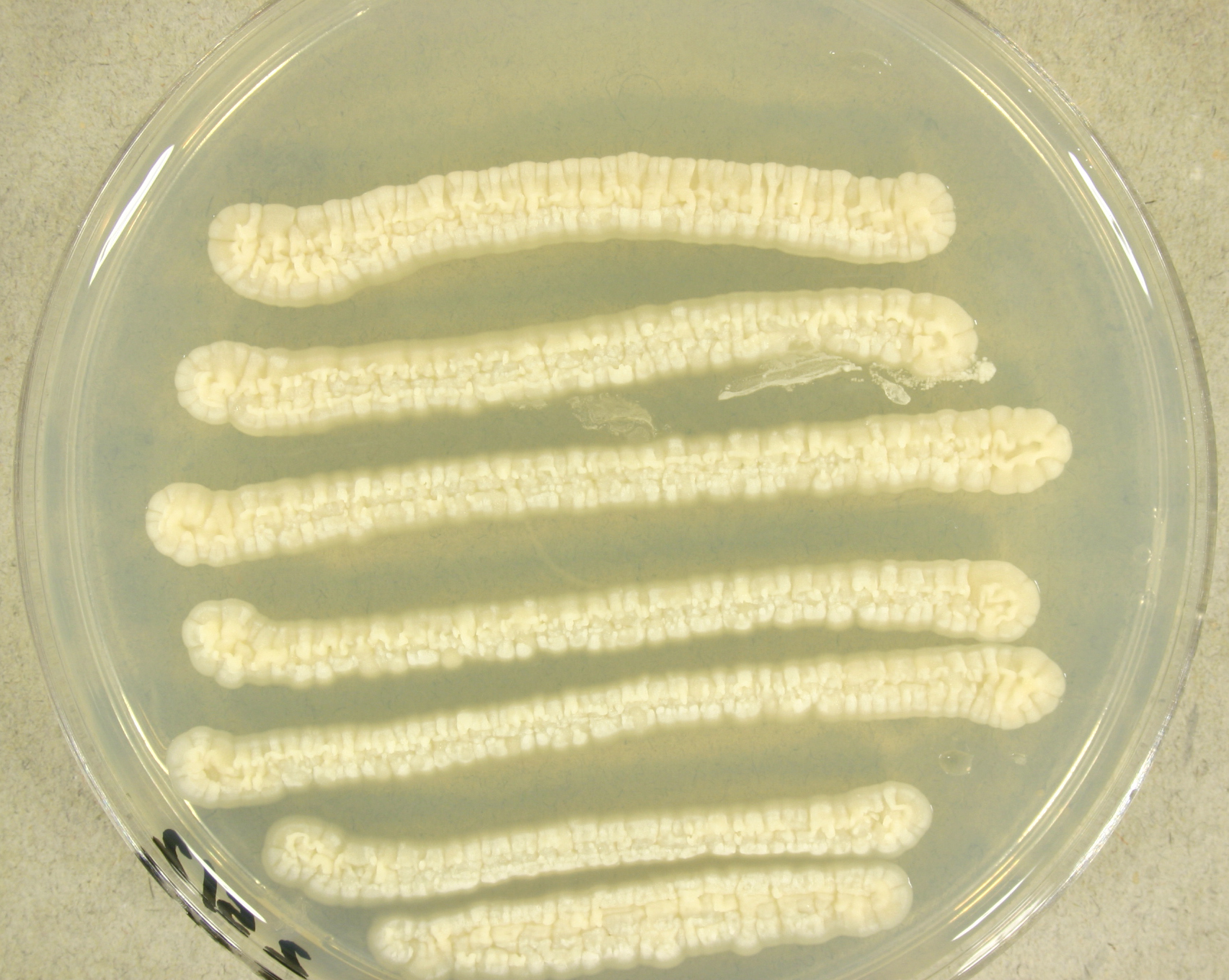

Scientific classification
- Kingdom: Fungi
- Division: Basidiomycota
- Class: Tremellomycetes
- Order: Trichosporonales
- Family: Trichosporonaceae
- Genus: Trichosporon
- Species: T. asteroides

Binomial name
- Trichosporon asteroides M. Ota (1926)

Synonyms
- Parendomyces asteroides Rischin (1921); Geotrichoides asteroides (Rischin) Langeron & Talice (1932); Proteomyces asteroides (Rischin) C.W. Dodge (1935); Prototheca filamenta P. Arnold & Ahearn (1972); Fissuricella filamenta (P. Arnold & Ahearn) Pore, D'Amatao & Ajello (1977)

= Trichosporon asteroides =

Species of fungus

Trichosporon asteroides is an asexual basidiomycetous fungus first described from human skin but now mainly isolated from blood and urine. T. asteroides is a hyphal fungus with a characteristically yeast-like appearance due to the presence of slimy arthroconidia. Infections by this species usually respond to treatment with azoles and amphotericin B.

== History and taxonomy ==
Trichosporon asteroides was isolated from lesion of male chin skin by Rinchin in Bern in 1926 and named in the genus, Parendomyces. T. asteroides was later reevaluated by Masao Ota and transferred to the genus Trichosporon as T. asteroides. Ota noted that its hyphae were more sparsely branched than other species in Trichosporon, and it lacked the ability to ferment glucose, maltose, sucrose and fructose. Molecular phylogenetic study has since supported the placement of T. asteroides in the genus Trichsporon. T. asteroides was determined to be conspecific with Fissuricella filamenta on the basis of DNA/DNA reassociation. Modern classifications support the placement of this species within the order Trichosporonales.

== Growth and morphology ==
Trichosporon asteroides grows in a range of media including in the presence of the antifungal agent, cycloheximide. Colonies of T. asteroides grown on Sabouraud agar appear white with a brain-like texture, reaching a diameter of 10 mm after 10 days growth at 25 °C (77 °F). Colonies have a radially furrowed outer zone and matt appearance that is not powdery like the related species, T. asahii. Antibodies produced by infected patients can also be used to differentiate T. asahii and T. asteroides in disease. Weak growth is seen at 37 °C (99 °F) but is absent at higher temperatures. T. asteroides can be distinguished from related Trichosporon species by its ability to utilize D-galactose, L-rhamnose, erythritol and L-arabinitol.

== Physiology and pathogenesis ==
Trichosporon asteroides does not ferment glucose, maltose, sucrose or fructose, a feature common to all Trichosporon species. T. asteroides causes trichosporonosis, causing deep-seated, mucosa-associated, superficial, and systematic infections including blood. This species is one of the three most common Trichosporon species isolated in clinical settings. The fungus is sometimes recovered from specimens of blood, urine, and aspiration fluid, vaginal mucosa, male perigenital skin area, and catheters. The first record of this agent in a systemic infection involved a bloodstream infection. Main types of latent infection include fungemia, urinary tract infections, peritonitis, endocarditis, arthritis, esophagitis, meningitis, brain abscess, splenic abscess, and uterine infections. Allergies and systemic infections can also be caused by this fungus particularly in immunosuppressed people. Recently, T. asteroides was implicated in a case of kerion celsi, a rare, highly inflammatory scalp infection seen mainly in children.

This fungus is rarely encountered in zoonotic infections and has never been shown to cause disease in insects. However, T. asteroides was isolated from multifocal, irregularly raised skin lesions on a female bottle-nosed dolphin, Tursiops truncatus, in Japan. In the absence of cultures and molecular biological analysis, the agent was initially suspected to be Paracoccidioides ceti, a worldwide causative agent of Paracoccidioidomycosis in dolphins.

== Treatment ==
Azole antifungals are often used as a front-line therapy in trichosporonosis. Resistance to amphotericin, flucytosine, fluconazole, and itraconazole have been described. Echinocandins, as a group, are ineffective against Trichosporon species. Triazoles show better in vitro and in vivo antifungal activity than amphotericin B, while voriconazole also has excellent in vitro activity against Trichosporon asteroides. Combination therapy regimens such as voriconazole and amphotericin B are also effective in serious infections. Fluconazole has been used successfully in subcutaneous and deep infections.
