= Apiotrichum mycotoxinivorans =

Scientific classification
- Kingdom: Fungi
- Division: Basidiomycota
- Class: Tremellomycetes
- Order: Trichosporonales
- Family: Trichosporonaceae
- Genus: Apiotrichum
- Species: A. mycotoxinivorans

Binomial name
- Apiotrichum mycotoxinivorans (O. Molnár, Schatzm. & Prillinger) A.M. Yurkov & Boekhout (2015)

Synonyms
- Trichosporon mycotoxinivorans O. Molnár, Schatzm. & Prillinger (2004)

Species of fungus

Apiotrichum mycotoxinivorans (synonym Trichosporon mycotoxinivorans) is a yeast species purportedly useful in the detoxification of various mycotoxins. It was first isolated from the hindgut of the termite Mastotermes darwiniensis. It has been shown to detoxify mycotoxins such as ochratoxin A and zearalenone. It can occasionally become a human pathogen.
