= Apiotrichum =

Scientific classification
- Kingdom: Fungi
- Division: Basidiomycota
- Class: Tremellomycetes
- Order: Trichosporonales
- Family: Trichosporonaceae
- Genus: Apiotrichum; Stautz (1931)

Type species
- Apiotrichum porosum Stautz

Synonyms
- Hyalodendron; Protendomycopsis

Genus of fungi

Apiotrichum is a genus of fungi in the family Trichosporonaceae. Species are only known from their yeast states, most of which were formerly referred to the genus Trichosporon. Twenty species have been described worldwide. Apiotrichum mycotoxinivorans is an occasional human pathogen.
