= Dipodascus klebahnii =

Scientific classification
- Kingdom: Fungi
- Division: Ascomycota
- Class: Dipodascomycetes
- Order: Dipodascales
- Family: Dipodascaceae
- Genus: Dipodascus
- Species: D. klebahnii

Binomial name
- Dipodascus klebahnii (Stautz) P.M. Kirk

Synonyms
- Endomyces lactis var. klebahnii Windisch; Geotrichum penicillatum (do Carmo-Sousa) von Arx; Geotrichum klebahnii (Stautz) Morenz; Oospora klebahni Stautz; Oospora klebahnii Stautz; Trichosporon penicillatum do Carmo-Sousa

Species of fungus

Dipodascus klebahnii is a yeast and plant pathogen fungus.
