= Arthrographis kalrae =

Scientific classification
- Kingdom: Fungi
- Division: Ascomycota
- Class: Dothideomycetes
- Family: Eremomycetaceae
- Genus: Arthrographis
- Species: A. kalrae

Binomial name
- Arthrographis kalrae Sigler & J.W. Carmich. (1983)

Synonyms
- Arthrographis kalrai Sigler & J.W. Carmich.; Oidiodendron kalrae R.P. Tewari & Macph. (1963); Arthrographis langeronii G. Cochet (1938)

Ascomycetous fungus

Arthrographis kalrae is an ascomycetous fungus responsible for human nail infections described in 1938 by Cochet as A. langeronii. A. kalrae is considered a weak pathogen of animals including human restricted to the outermost keratinized layers of tissue. Infections caused by this species are normally responsive to commonly used antifungal drugs with only very rare exceptions.

== History and taxonomy ==
Arthrographis kalrae was first discovered from a lesion on nails of a male patient and classified as A. langeronii by Cochet in France in 1938 although a Latin diagnosis was not provided. It was next reported from a lung specimen taken from a patient in India in 1963 by Tewari and Macpherson who, unaware of Cochet's earlier work, treated it in the genus Oidiodendron as O. kalrae. Sigler and Carmichael re-evaluated these records in 1976 and validated Cochet's generic thereby establishing the taxon as A. kalrae where it has since remained.

== Conidiogenesis and morphology ==
Arthrographis kalrae is primarily known as an asexual fungus, producing single-celled arthroconidia with thin, smooth walls. The fungus grows relatively slowly culture with colonies initially yellowish-white in colour and yeast-like, varying from yellowish-brown to tan in color and powdery at maturity. Most sporogenous hyphae are irregularly branched in a tree-like pattern at the apex. Diversity in colonial morphology does not appear to correlate with genotypic diversity. Some strains develop globose cleistothecia may develop. DNA sequencing and PCR-based methods are useful in confirming the identity of this species.

== Ecology and physiology ==
Arthrographis kalrae is widely distributed in air, soil, compost, sputum and skin lesions. A. kalrae infections have been reported from various continents. A. kalrae is saprotrophic and thermotolerant with a range of growth tolerance between 15–45 °C (59–113 °F). A. kalrae can resist antifungal agents such as cycloheximide and cadmium. This species actively degrades keratin and can invade mammalian hair shafts by the formation of solitary, penetrating hyphae. Moderate antifungal activity is observed with itraconazole and ketoconazole. Terbinafine is associated with strong antifungal activity followed by posaconazole, amphotericin B and echinocandins.

== Pathogenicity ==
Arthrographis kalrae is capable of pathogenicity in animals (including humans) but not in plants. Most human isolates of A. kalrae originate from eyes, ears, toes and skin; occasionally, pulmonary infections have been reported; severe infections have been encountered in immunocompromised individuals such as people with chronic diseases, those receiving anti-cancer chemotherapy as well as recipients of allogeneic tissue transplantation. A. kalrae secretes antigens with haemolytic and cytotoxic activity. Additionally, scientists use mice as animal model to study the cellular and humeral responses triggered by A. kalrae. Within the mouse model, brain and kidney lesions have been observed. By analyzing the immune response in the mouse, it appears that lesions arise through inflammatory processes involving elevated IgG and IL-4. T helper cells likely also play an essential role in the promotion of this inflammatory response. Laboratory diagnosis is usually by isolation from diseased tissues (skin scrapes, hair and nails), fluids collected from body (blood, cerebrospinal fluid and urine) and bodily secretions (e.g., pus from lesions and airway secretions).

== Epidemiology ==
Strains isolated from clinical specimens have been recorded from Morocco, Australia, North America, Asia and Europe. A. kalrae is mainly distributed in soil, therefore, frequent contact with soil is thought to be a risk factor for infection in addition to abrogation of the cellular immune system. Hospitalization increases the chance of infection by this species. Prevention of infection is strictly by avoidance of inoculum and restoration of normal host resistance, since no vaccine is currently available. For the patients who undergo hematopoietic stem cell transplantation, antifungal prophylaxis is useful to prevent infection by this species. This species is considered a pathogen of emerging importance. Based on the statistics, the number of immunocompromised individuals and the incidence of fungal infection outbreaks increases rapidly.
