= Tryptophan aminopeptidase =

Tryptophan aminopeptidase may refer to:

- Tryptophanyl aminopeptidase, an enzyme
- Tryptophanamidase, an enzyme
