= Zymolyase =

Enzyme mixture

Zymolyase (also known as lyticase, sometimes misspelled as Zymolase) is an enzyme mixture used to degrade the cell wall of yeast and form spheroplasts. Essential activities of zymolyase include β-1,3-glucan laminaripentao-hydrolase activity and β-1,3-glucanase activity. A common source of zymolyase is the Actinobacteria Arthrobacter luteus. Commercial sources of zymolyase may have some residual protease activity.

Fungi susceptible to zymolyase can be found in the order Saccharomycetales.

Saccharomycetales genera that zymolyase is known to have activity against include:

Eremothecium, Candida, Debaryomyces, Eremothecium, Endomyces, Hansenula, Hanseniaspora, Kloekera, Kluyveromyces, Lipomyces, Metschikowia, Pichia, Pullularia, Saccharomyces, Saccharomycopsis, Schizosaccahromyces, Torulopsis
