= Geotrichum reessii =

Scientific classification
- Kingdom: Fungi
- Division: Ascomycota
- Class: Dipodascomycetes
- Order: Dipodascales
- Family: Dipodascaceae
- Genus: Geotrichum
- Species: G. reessii

Binomial name
- Geotrichum reessii (Van der Walt) H.Y. Zhu, X.Z. Liu & F.Y. Bai

Species of fungus

Geotrichum reessii is a yeast, belonging to the genus Geotrichum, that lives in soil and dissolves pectin. G. reessii was earlier known as Galactomyces reessii.

== Natural Occurrence and Reproduction ==
Geotrichum reessii lives naturally in soil and on decaying vegetable matter. G. reessii does not consume D-mannitol. It cannot ferment glucose. Both D-mannitol and glucose are present in plant matter which impacts G. reessii's ability to digest decaying vegetation.

There are two reproductive states for G. reessii: an asexual and a sexual form. The asexual form is called arthroconidia; and the sexual form is called ascomycetous. Ascomycetous for G. reessii involves the creation of ascospores, which come from a fruit called ascocarp. These fruits are known to have hyphae with pores that include Woronin bodies. These bodies act as plugs when a trauma happens to the hyphal segments. In the asci, there are usually around eight ascospores. The ascospores could be single cellular or multicellular.

== Enzymes and Uses ==
G. reessii contains enzymes that have diverse capabilities including the abilities to dissolve pectin, and remove phenol. G. reessii contains an enzyme that converts 3-methylcrotonic acid to 3-hydroxy-3-methylbutyric acid a.k.a. β-hydroxy β-methylbutyric acid. β-hydroxy β-methylbutyric acid (HMB) produced from Geotrichum reessii, was discovered to be beneficial to people engaging in resistance training.

It can also have an enzyme that dissolves pectin. G. reesii was used in a study for its "propectin-solubilizing enzyme-producing". Its enzyme was purified using chromotography and isolated as a crystalline form. The enzyme is a glycoprotein and catalyzes the highly polymerized pectin release from protopectins. The enzyme also works as a catalyst for the depolymerization of pectic acid oligomers.

Geotrichum reesii was studied as a treatment to remove phenolic contamination from palm oil extraction. G. reessii was isolated from subterranean termites. In this study, it was found that the enzymes, laccase and manganese peroxidase worked to depolymerize lignin, which is rich in phenol. During palm oil extraction, large amounts of water are used and contaminated with phenol. Phenol is dangerous because it's toxic to humans and can work as a corrosive. The results from this study indicated G. reessii could work as a phenol removal strain. This study concluded that this information could be used to make more efficient wastewater treatment systems for the removal of phenol.
