= Cutaneotrichosporon curvatum =

Scientific classification
- Kingdom: Fungi
- Division: Basidiomycota
- Class: Tremellomycetes
- Order: Trichosporonales
- Family: Trichosporonaceae
- Genus: Cutaneotrichosporon
- Species: C. curvatum

Binomial name
- Cutaneotrichosporon curvatum (Diddens & Lodder) Yurkov, Xin Zhan Liu, F.Y.Bai, M.Groenew. & Boekhout

Synonyms
- Candida heveanensis var. curvata; Cryptococcus curvatus

Species of fungus

Cutaneotrichosporon curvatum is a species of fungus in the family Trichosporonaceae. It is an extremophile found in cold-seep sites. It is oleaginous, and uses the sugars in cellulose for the growth and production of storage triglycerides. This species has been extensively studied in relationship to lipids. It can uptake both glucose and xylose simultaneously. When grown in old oil with high levels of polymerized triglycerides, the cell wall transforms from being smooth to having hairy or wart-like protuberances which are believed to assist in lipid uptake.
