= Yarrowia lipolytica =

Scientific classification
- Kingdom: Fungi
- Division: Ascomycota
- Class: Dipodascomycetes
- Order: Dipodascales
- Family: Dipodascaceae
- Genus: Yarrowia
- Species: Y. lipolytica

Binomial name
- Yarrowia lipolytica (Wick., Kurtzman & Herman) Van der Walt & Arx (1980)

Synonyms
- Candida lipolytica (F.C. Harrison) Diddens & Lodder (1942); Candida lipolytica var. thermotolerans Blagod. & Kock.-Krat. (1973); Candida olea; Candida oleae Kreger-van Rij & Verona (1949); Candida paralipolytica K. Yamada & Y. Otani (1963); Candida petrophilum I. Takeda, Iguchi, Tsuzuki & T. Nakano (1972); Candida pseudolipolytica Blagod. & Kock.-Krat. (1973); Endomycopsis lipolytica Wick., Kurtzman & Herman (1970); Monilia cornealis Nann. (1928); Mycotorula lipolytica F.C. Harrison (1928); Proteomyces cornealis (Nann.) C.W. Dodge (1935); Saccharomycopsis lipolytica Yarrow (1972); Saccharomycopsis pseudolipolytica Blagod. (1979)

Species of fungus

Yarrowia lipolytica is a species of fungus in the family Dipodascaceae. It is notable for its use of unusual carbon sources, such as hydrocarbons. This has made it of interest for use in industrial microbiology, especially for the production of specialty lipids.

== Biology ==
=== Habitat ===
Yarrowia lipolytica has been isolated from various locations (e.g. milled corn fiber tailings or Paris sewers). Often these environments contain an excess of lipids, which can be efficiently utilized by Y. lipolytica as a carbon and energy source. This species is strictly aerobic.

=== Oleaginous yeast ===
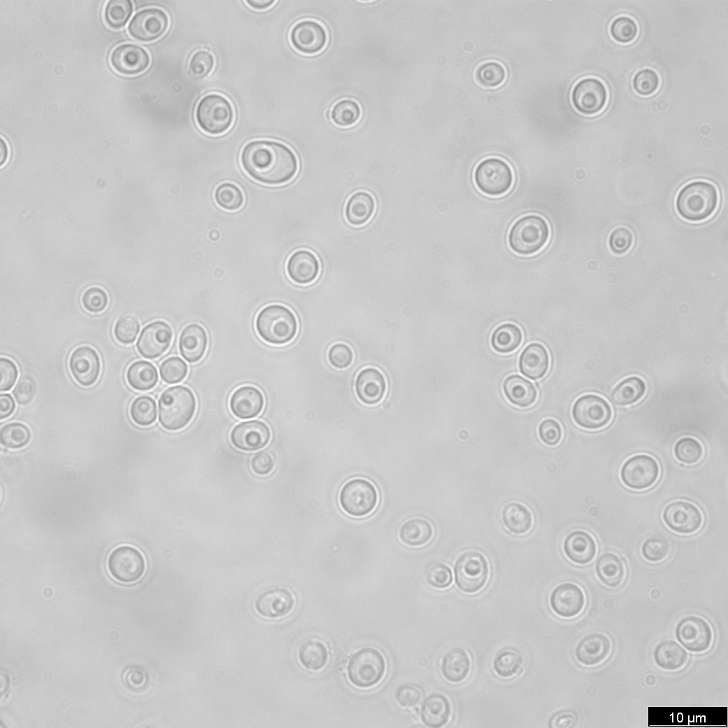
Single cell state of Yarrowia lipolytica under microscope

The cells of Y. lipolytica have over 20% fat content, placing it in the group of oleaginous yeasts. Most lipids are stored as triacylglycerides (TAGs). This physiological trait makes this species especially interesting for producing lipid derivates. For example, genetic engineering and process optimization allow it to produce high amounts of eicosapentaenoic acid (EPA).

=== Dimorphism ===
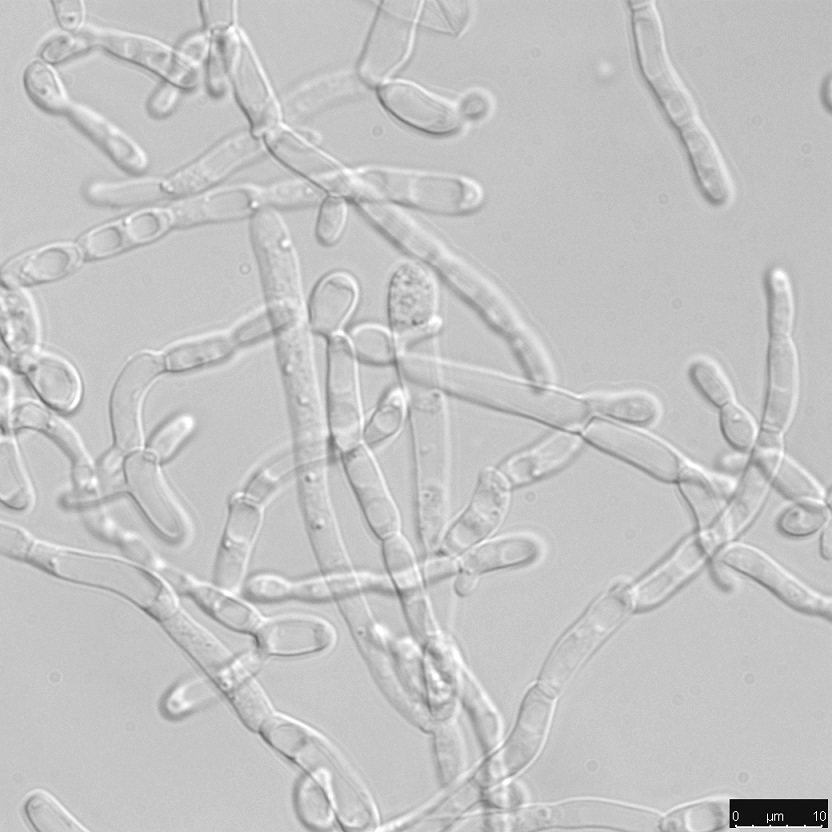
Filamentous cell state of Yarrowia lipolytica

Yarrowia lipolytica has dimorphic growth, which means it can grow in two different phenotypes. The usual form of the cells can be described as round and spherical. When exposed to stressful conditions such as temperature, pH, mechanical or osmotic stress, the cell can switch into a filamentous growth form (also see hyphae).

=== Genome ===
The genome of Y. lipolytica consists of around 20.5 Mbp (mega base pairs), encodes for over 7000 genes and is distributed on six chromosomes (named A to F) and the mitochondrial DNA (M). Naturally, there are small differences in the length of the genomes of different strain isolates. Usually hemiascomycetous yeast have a low number of introns, but Y. lipolytica is an exception with about 15% of genes containing introns.

== Epidemiology ==
Y. lipolytica can occur as a rare cause of opportunistic invasive fungal infections, particularly in immunocompromised humans. In a clinical context, it is sometimes referred by its synonym from the genus Candida, Candida lipolytica.

== Usage ==
In January 2019, Yarrowia lipolytica yeast biomass was defined by the European Food Safety Authority as a safe novel food – dried and heat‐killed – with the underlying qualifications that it is widespread in nature, present in the typical environment, may be used as food for people over three years of age (3 grams per day for children under age 10, and 6 grams per day for teens and adults), and may be manufactured as a dietary supplement.

In April 2025, the EU approved the use of a genetically modified strain of Yarrowia lipolytica for the production of a stevia food additive under the number E 960b(i). The strain is used for the fermentation of Rebaudioside M.
