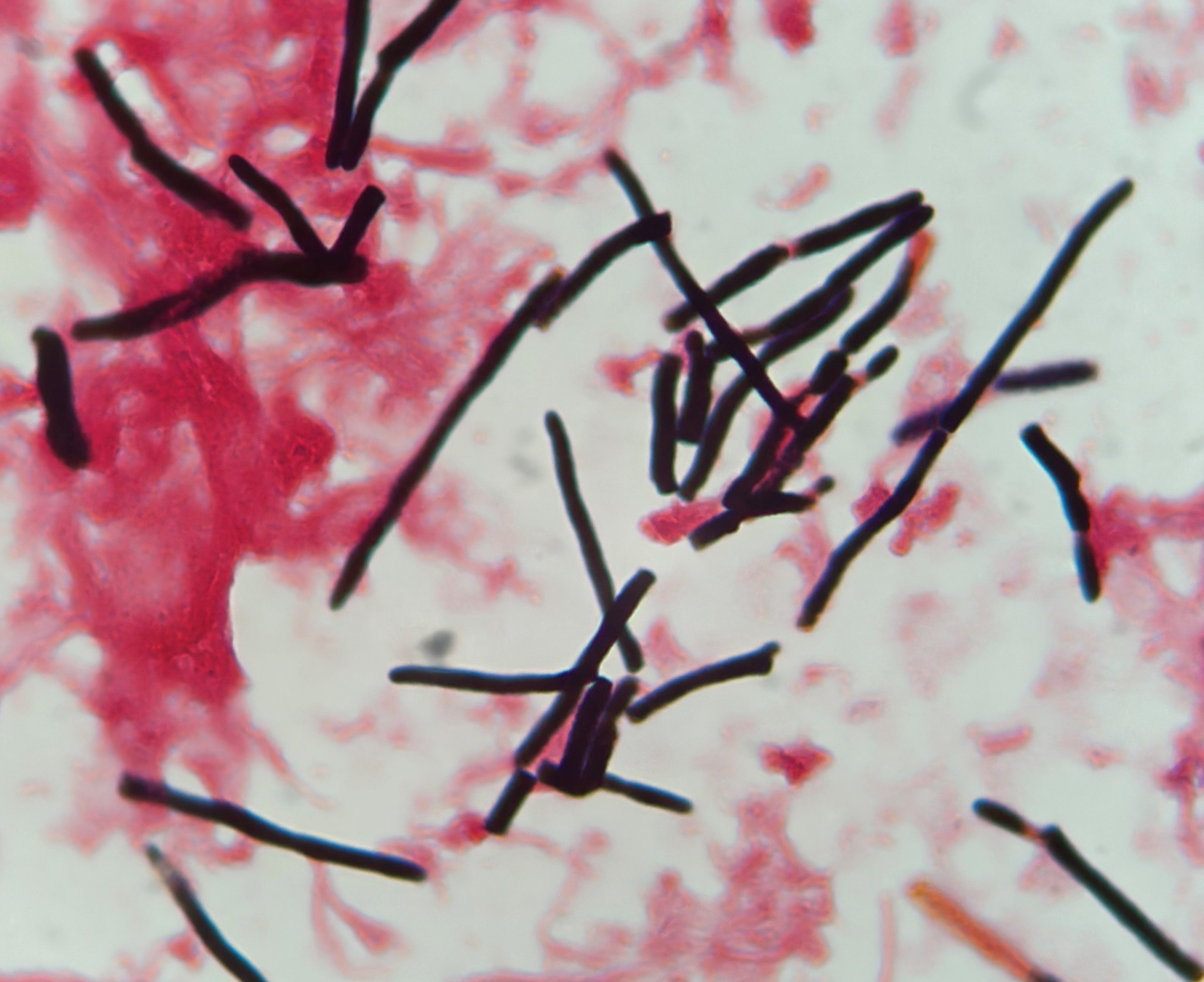
- Gram stain of T. asahii

Scientific classification
- Kingdom: Fungi
- Division: Basidiomycota
- Class: Tremellomycetes
- Order: Trichosporonales
- Family: Trichosporonaceae
- Genus: Trichosporon
- Species: T. asahii

Binomial name
- Trichosporon asahii Akagi ex Sugita, A.Nishikawa & Shinoda

= Trichosporon asahii =

Species of fungus

Trichosporon asahii is a non-Candida yeast that has been reported to cause infections in immunocompromised patients. T. asahii is the most prominent human pathogen in its genus, causing more than half of all Trichosporon infections. First discovered and named in 1929, the currently accepted nomenclature of T. asahii was validated in 1994.

== Disease ==
The clinical manifestations of T. asahii infection are non-specific and vary depending on the site of infection. The most common types of infection were urinary tract infections, fungemia, and disseminated infection. Cutaneous infections have also been reported.

== Identification and culture ==
T. asahii grows readily on routine laboratory media, producing white, yellow, or cream, yeast-like colonies on Sabouraud dextrose agar. This fungus has a rapid growth rate and colonies mature in 5 days. When grown on cornmeal-Tween 80 agar, true hyphae, pseudohyphae, and blastoconidia can be seen under microscopic examination. Arthroconidia can be observed in older cultures. This fungus is able to hydrolyze urea through the production of urease.

== Treatment ==
ESCMID/ECMM guidelines recommend the use of voriconazole for the treatment of invasive T. asahii infections. Patients have also been treated with amphotericin B and triazole therapy.
