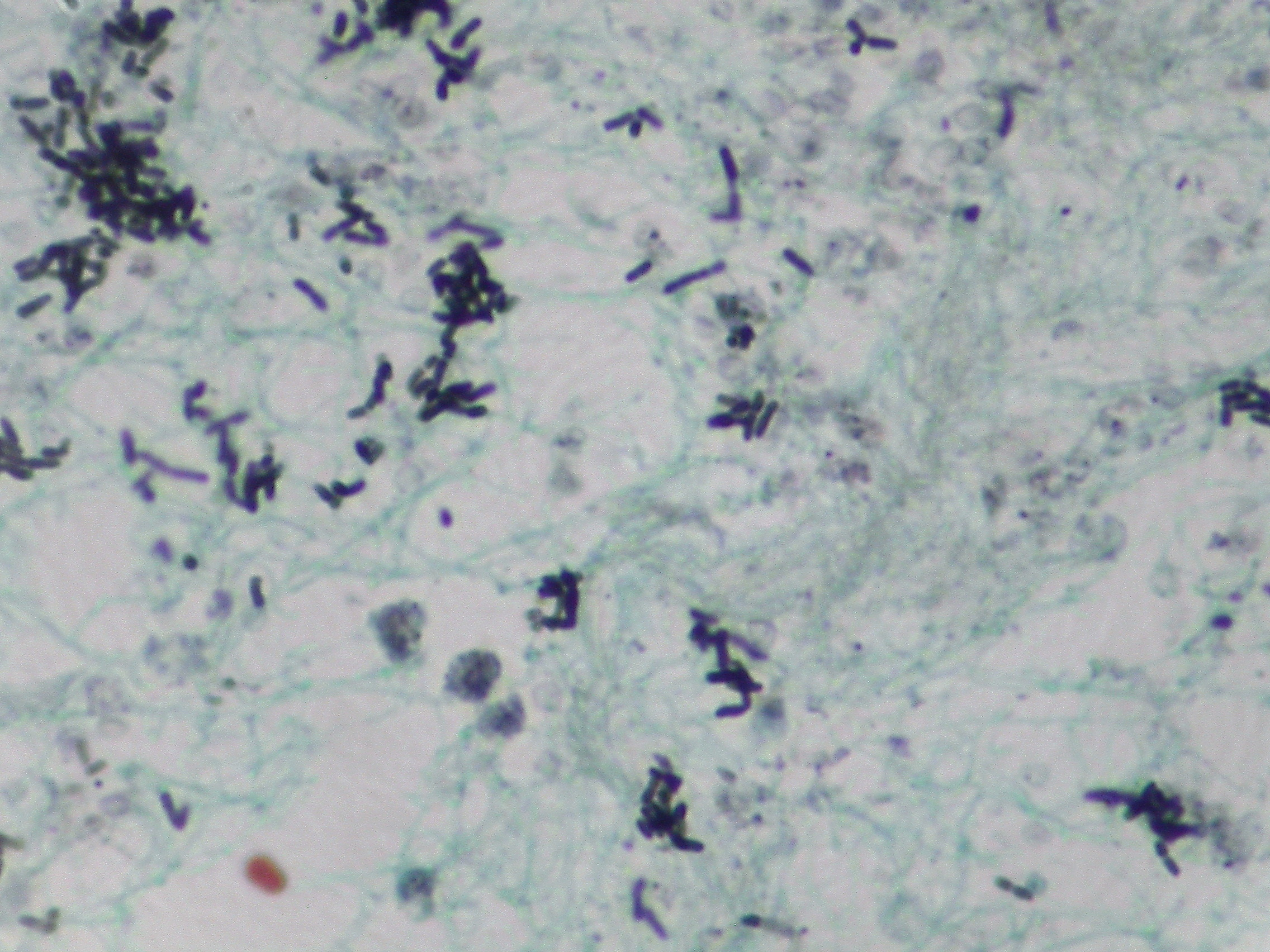
- Geotrichum candidum

Scientific classification
- Kingdom: Fungi
- Division: Ascomycota
- Class: Dipodascomycetes
- Order: Dipodascales
- Family: Dipodascaceae
- Genus: Geotrichum
- Species: G. candidum

Binomial name
- Geotrichum candidum Link (1809)

Synonyms
- Galactomyces candidus, Galactomyces candidum de Hoog & M.T. Sm., (2004)

= Geotrichum candidum =

Species of fungus

Geotrichum candidum is a fungus which is a member of the human microbiome, notably associated with skin, sputum, and faeces where it occurs in 25–30% of specimens. It is common in soil and has been isolated from soil collected around the world, in all continents.

G. candidum is the causative agent of the human disease geotrichosis and the plant disease sour rot which infects citrus fruits, tomatoes, carrots, and other vegetables. It can affect harvested fruit of durians such as Durio graveolens.

G. candidum is used widely in the production of certain dairy products including rind cheeses such as Camembert, Saint-Nectaire, Reblochon, and others. The fungus can also be found in a Nordic yogurt-like product known as viili where it is responsible for the product's velvety texture.

In a 2001 study, G. candidum was found to consume the polycarbonate found in CDs.

== History ==
=== Taxonomy ===
The genus Geotrichum was described by Johann Heinrich Friedrich Link in 1809 to accommodate the species G. candidum found on decaying leaves. Since then, over 130 taxa have been described in the genus, and hundreds of synonyms have been generated. For example, G. candidum was misclassified as the Oidium lactis in much early literature. Species of Geotrichum resemble the genera Trichosporon and Protendomycopsis; however, Geotrichum is of ascomycetous affiliation whereas the latter are members of the Basidiomycota. Species of Geotrichum are occasionally mistaken for fast growing members of the genus Dipodascus, which are characterized by irregularly branched, 10–14 μm wide hyphae and the production of single-spored asci. However, unlike Geotrichum, members of the genus Dipodascus lack dichotomous branching of the peripheral hyphae and their growth rates are generally less than 3 mm per day.

=== Phylogeny ===
Galactomyces candidus, formerly thought to be a distinct taxon, was found to be the sexual state of G. candidum using sequence-based methods Geotrichum candidum in the broad sense comprises 3 clades, corresponding to the species G. candidum, G. clavatum and G. fici, all of which are thought to have pathogenic potential. Species of Geotrichum can be differentiated by sequence analysis of the nuclear ribosomal large subunit (18S ribosomal RNA) or the internal transcribed spacer region of the nuclear ribosomal RNA gene.

== Morphology ==
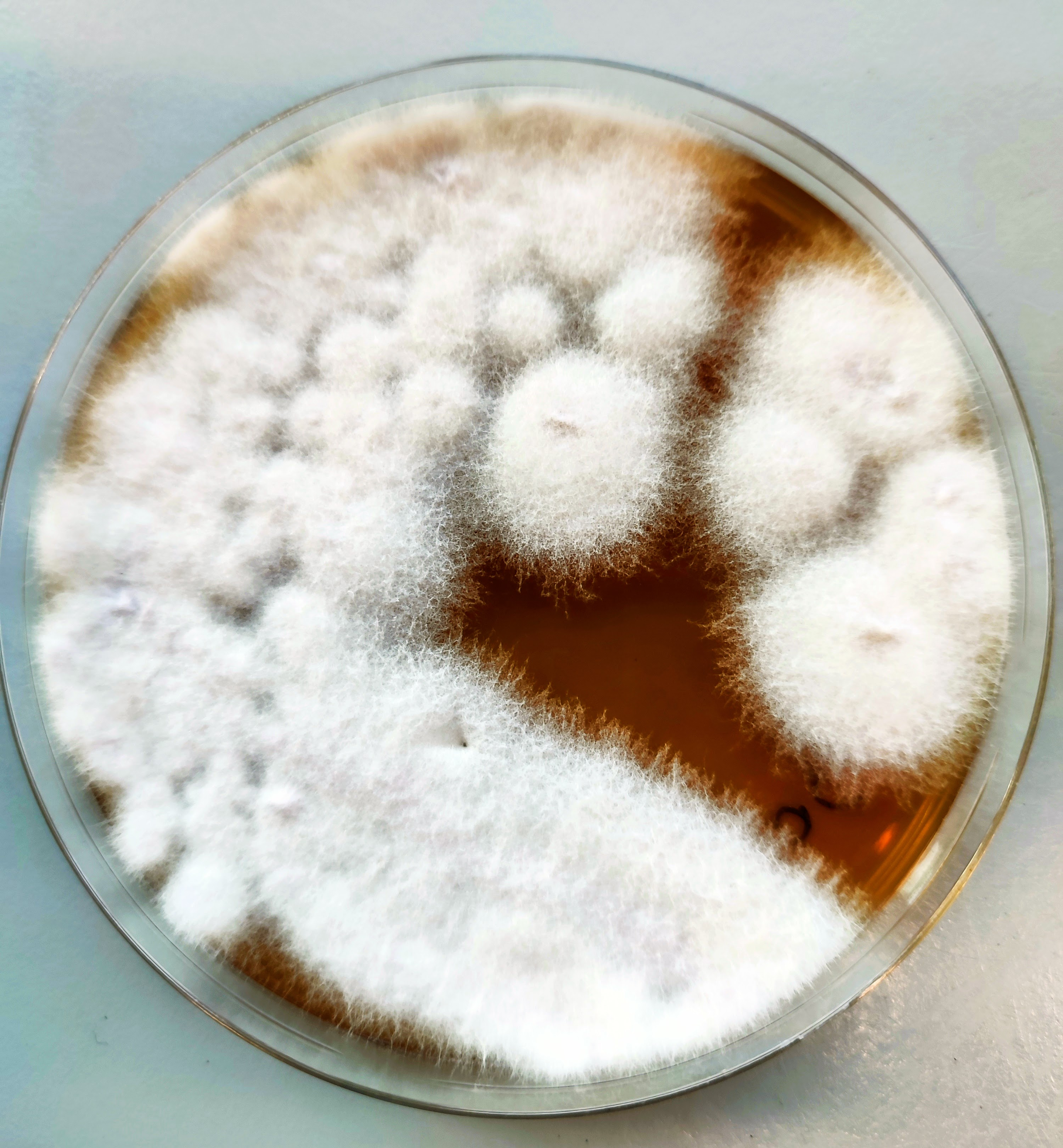
Geotrichum candidum growing on malt-dextrose agar

=== Anamorph ===
G. candidum colonies are thin, spreading, soft, creamy and white in the anamorph state. The fungus G. candidum is characterized by hyphae that appear creeping, mostly submerged and septate. The hyphae colour appears to be hyaline or lightly pigmented. When the hyphae becomes airborne it changes shape from arthroconidia to cylindrical or barrel-shaped or ellipsoidal. Chlamydospores are subglobose, solitary, borne on undifferentiated hyphae. Blastoconidia sometimes develop on hyphae laterally. Conidia appear arthrosporous, terminal or intercalary, aerial on an agar surface. The conidia size ranges from 4.8 to 12.5 μm x 2.4–2.5 μm.

=== Teleomorph ===
G. candidum is thought to be homothallic but most isolates are self-sterile. Sexual reproduction was first observed in strains isolated from soils in Puerto Rico. The fungus produces globose asci that contain a single, thick walled, uninucleated, globose to oval ascospore measuring 6–7 μm by 7–10 μm. The ascospores have a smooth inner wall and a furrowed outer wall. The septa are perforated by microspores, arranged in a ring structure. The colonies appear to be growing faster in the sexual stage than the asexual stage. Colonies grow at a rate of 5–7 mm daily at 24 °C (75 °F).

== Growth ==
Geotrichum candidum forms a fast growing colony that can grow to 5–6 cm diameter at 5 days on Sabouraud-glucose agar, wort agar and synthetic media. Microscopically, the growth is characterized by the production of dichotomously branched hyphae that resemble tuning forks along the colony margin. The condial chains become aerial, erect or decumbent and measure 6–12(−20) x 3–6(−9) μm. The fungus can grow on a variety of citrus fruits and cause Sour Rot. It tends to cause rotting in fruits that are stored at 0–5 °C (32–41 °F). The conidia are colourless and have a slimy coating. G. candidum is also found occasionally in the human gut, feces, sputum and on skin. The fungus grows in soil, water, sewage, various plant substrates, baker's dough, husks of fermentation, bread, milk and milk products The optimal temperature for growth is 25 °C (77 °F) with a pH range of 5.0–5.5. The temperature range changes depending on the surface that the fungus grows on. For example, in plants the optimum temperature ranges from 25–27 °C (77–81 °F). In animals the optimum temperature ranges from 30–31 °C (86–88 °F). The maximum temperature for growth is 35–38 °C (95–100 °F). Fungal growth can be supported by D-glucose, D-mannose, D-xylose, L-sorbose, D-fructose, D-galactose, sucrose, D-mannitol, D-sorbital, ethanol and glycerol. Sporulation often requires a balance of carbon and nitrogen.

== Distribution ==
G. candidum is extremely common in soil and has been isolated from substrates in Canada, United States, Britain, Germany, Austria, India, South Africa, Japan, Brazil and Peru. It is also found as a causal agent in sour rot in citrus fruits— a soft rot associated with the emission of a fruity odour. The fungus is also known as a post-harvest spoilage agent of muskmelon, squash and cucumber. It plays a role in tomato fruit rot when it is stored at 0–5 °C (32–41 °F).

It is a naturally occurring colonist of certain dairy products (particularly cheeses) and is sometimes used to inoculate wash-rind and bloomy rind cheeses.

== Commercial uses ==
G. candidum can be used commercially to inoculate wash-rinds and bloomy rind cheeses. Cultures can be added to milk, brine or sprayed onto cheese surface. The optimum pH range for growth on cheese ranges from 4.4 to 6.7. The fungus colonizes nearly the entire surface of the cheese during the early stages of ripening. It is found on soft cheeses like Camembert cheese and semi-hard cheese Saint-Nectaire and Reblochon. For the Camembert cheese the fungi grows on the outside of the cheese forming a rind. The fungus is responsible for the uniform, white, velvety coat on Saint-Marcellin cheese. Lipases and proteases from G. candidum release fatty acids and peptides that provide the cheese with distinctive flavors. G. candidum reduces the bitterness in Camembert cheese through the activity of the aminopeptidases that hydrolyze low molecular weight hydrophobic peptides. Aminopeptidases also contributes an aroma in traditional Norman Camembert. The fungus also neutralizes the curd by catabolizing lactic acid produced by bacteria. G. candidum prepares the cheese for colonization of other acid sensitive bacteria such as Brevibacterium. The fungus inhibits growth of the bacteria Listeria monocytogenes. Commercial strains of G. candidum are available for cheese ripening.

== Literature ==
- Pahwa, S; Kaur, S; Jain, R; Roy, N (2010). "Structure based design of novel inhibitors for histidinol dehydrogenase from Geotrichum candidum". Bioorg Med Chem Lett. 20 (13): 3972–6. doi:10.1016/j.bmcl.2010.04.116. PMID 20488699.
