= Oligoxyloglucan reducing-end-specific cellobiohydrolase =

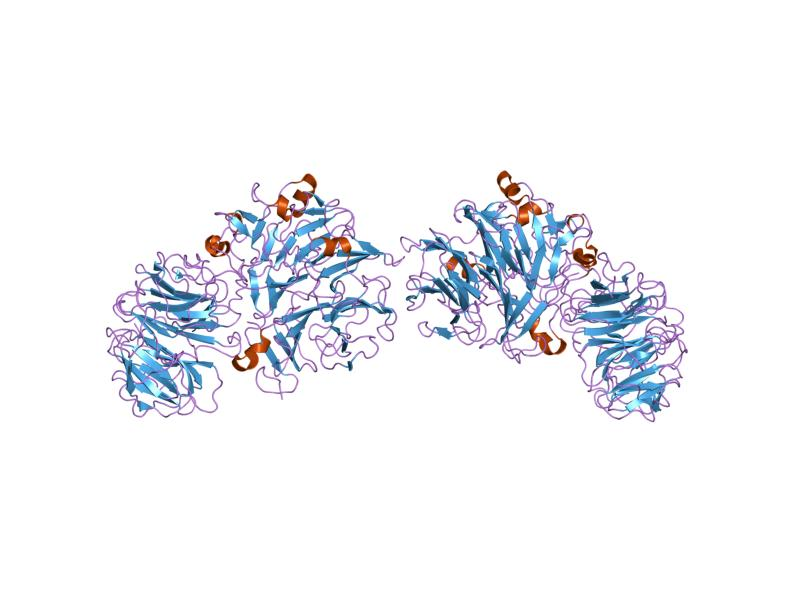

Identifiers
- EC no.: 3.2.1.150
- CAS no.: 753502-07-7

Databases
- IntEnz: IntEnz view
- BRENDA: BRENDA entry
- ExPASy: NiceZyme view
- KEGG: KEGG entry
- MetaCyc: metabolic pathway
- PRIAM: profile
- PDB structures: RCSB PDB PDBe PDBsum
Search
- PMC: articles
- PubMed: articles
- NCBI: proteins

Oligoxyloglucan reducing-end-specific cellobiohydrolase (EC 3.2.1.150) is an enzyme with systematic name oligoxyloglucan reducing-end cellobiohydrolase. This enzyme catalyses the following chemical reaction

Hydrolysis of cellobiose from the reducing end of xyloglucans consisting of a (1->4)-beta-linked glucan carrying alpha-D-xylosyl groups on O-6 of the glucose residues.

The enzyme is found in the fungus Geotrichum sp. M128.
