= Yarrowia =

Scientific classification
- Kingdom: Fungi
- Division: Ascomycota
- Class: Dipodascomycetes
- Order: Dipodascales
- Family: Dipodascaceae
- Genus: Yarrowia an der Walt & Arx (1981)

Type species
- Yarrowia lipolytica (Wick., Kurtzman & Herman) Van der Walt & Arx (1980)

Species
- Yarrowia alimentaria Yarrowia bubula Yarrowia deformans Yarrowia galli Yarrowia hollandica Yarrowia keelungensis Yarrowia lipolytica Yarrowia osloensis Yarrowia parophonii Yarrowia phangngaensis Yarrowia porcina Yarrowia yakushimensis

Genus of fungi

Yarrowia is a fungal genus in the family Dipodascaceae. For a while the genus was monotypic, containing the single species Yarrowia lipolytica, a yeast that can use unusual carbon sources, such as hydrocarbons. Molecular phylogenetics analysis has revealed several other species that have since been added to the genus.
