= Lipomyces arxii =

Scientific classification
- Kingdom: Fungi
- Division: Ascomycota
- Class: Lipomycetes
- Order: Lipomycetales
- Family: Lipomycetaceae
- Genus: Lipomyces
- Species: L. arxii

Binomial name
- Lipomyces arxii (Van der Walt, M.T. Sm. & Y. Yamada) Kurtzman, Albertyn & Bas.-Powers

Genus of fungi

Lipomyces arxii is a species of fungi in the family Lipomycetaceae.
