= Ascocephalophora =

Scientific classification
- Kingdom: Fungi
- Division: Ascomycota
- Class: Dipodascomycetes
- Order: Dipodascales
- Family: Dipodascaceae
- Genus: Ascocephalophora; K. Matsush. & Matsush.

Type species
- Ascocephalophora petasiformis K. Matsush. & Matsush.

Genus of fungi

Ascocephalophora is a genus of fungi in the family Dipodascaceae. A monotypic genus, it contains the single species Ascocephalophora petasiformis.
