= Phialoascus =

Scientific classification
- Kingdom: Fungi
- Division: Ascomycota
- Class: Dipodascomycetes
- Order: Dipodascales
- Family: Dipodascaceae
- Genus: Phialoascus; Redhead & Malloch

Type species
- Phialoascus borealis Redhead & Malloch

Genus of fungi

Phialoascus is a genus of fungi in the family Dipodascaceae. A monotypic genus, it contains the single species Phialoascus borealis.
