= Zygozyma =

Scientific classification
- Kingdom: Fungi
- Division: Ascomycota
- Class: Dipodascomycetes
- Order: Dipodascales
- Family: Dipodascaceae
- Genus: Zygozyma; Van der Walt & Arx

Type species
- Zygozyma oligophaga Van der Walt & Arx

Genus of fungi

Zygozyma is a genus of fungi in the family Dipodascaceae.
