= Lipomycetaceae =

Scientific classification
- Kingdom: Fungi
- Division: Ascomycota
- Class: Lipomycetes
- Order: Lipomycetales
- Family: Lipomycetaceae; E.K. Novák & Zsolt

Type genus
- Lipomyces Lodder & Kreger

Genera
- Dipodascopsis; Babjevia; Lipomyces; Kawasakia; Zygozyma

Family of fungi

The Lipomycetaceae are a family of yeasts in the order Lipomycetales. According to the 2007 Outline of Ascomycota, the family contains five genera; the placement of the genus Kawasakia is uncertain. Species in the family have a widespread distribution, and grow in the soil or in association with insects.
