= Cutaneotrichosporon =

Scientific classification
- Kingdom: Fungi
- Division: Basidiomycota
- Class: Tremellomycetes
- Order: Trichosporonales
- Family: Trichosporonaceae
- Genus: Cutaneotrichosporon; Xin Zhan Liu, F.Y. Bai, M. Groenew. & Boekhout, 2015

Species
- See text

Genus of fungus

Cutaneotrichosporon is a genus of fungus in the family Trichosporonaceae. Species within the genus include:

- Cutaneotrichosporon aggtelekiense (A.Nováková, Savická & M.Kolařík) M.Takash., Manabe, Y.Nishim., Sriswasdi, Ohkuma, W.Iwasaki & Sugita
- Cutaneotrichosporon arboriforme (Sugita, M.Takash., A.Sano, Nishim., Kinebuchi, S.Yamag. & Osanai) Xin Zhan Liu, F.Y.Bai, M.Groenew. & Boekhout
- Cutaneotrichosporon cavernicola M.Takash., Kurakado, O.Cho, K.Kikuchi, Sugiy. & Sugita
- Cutaneotrichosporon curvatum (Diddens & Lodder) Yurkov, Xin Zhan Liu, F.Y.Bai, M.Groenew. & Boekhout
- Cutaneotrichosporon cutaneum (Beurm., Gougerot & Vaucher bis) Xin Zhan Liu, F.Y.Bai, M.Groenew. & Boekhout
- Cutaneotrichosporon cyanovorans (Motaung, Albertyn, Kock & C.H.Pohl) Yurkov, Xin Zhan Liu, F.Y.Bai, M.Groenew. & Boekhout
- Cutaneotrichosporon daszewskae (M.Takash., Sugita, Shinoda & Nakase) Yurkov, Xin Zhan Liu, F.Y.Bai, M.Groenew. & Boekhout
- Cutaneotrichosporon debeurmannianum (Sugita, Takashima, Nakase & Shinoda) X.Z.Liu, F.Y.Bai, Groenewald & Boekhout
- Cutaneotrichosporon dermatis (Sugita, M.Takash., Nakase & Shinoda) Xin Zhan Liu, F.Y.Bai, M.Groenew. & Boekhout
- Cutaneotrichosporon haglerorum (Middelhoven, Á.Fonseca, S.C.Carreiro, Pagnocca & O.C.Bueno) Xin Zhan Liu, F.Y.Bai, M.Groenew. & Boekhout
- Cutaneotrichosporon jirovecii (Frágner) Xin Zhan Liu, F.Y.Bai, M.Groenew. & Boekhout
- Cutaneotrichosporon middelhovenii M.Takash., Kurakado, O.Cho, K.Kikuchi, Sugiy. & Sugita
- Cutaneotrichosporon moniliiforme (E.Guého & M.T.Sm.) Xin Zhan Liu, F.Y.Bai, M.Groenew. & Boekhout
- Cutaneotrichosporon mucoides (E.Guého & M.T.Sm.) Xin Zhan Liu, F.Y.Bai, M.Groenew. & Boekhout
- Cutaneotrichosporon oleaginosum (J.J.Zhou, S.O.Suh & Gujjari) Xin Zhan Liu, F.Y.Bai, M.Groenew. & Boekhout
- Cutaneotrichosporon smithiae (Middelhoven, Scorzetti, Sugita & Fell) Xin Zhan Liu, F.Y.Bai, M.Groenew. & Boekhout
- Cutaneotrichosporon spelunceum (A.Nováková, Savická & M.Kolařík) M.Takash., Manabe, Y.Nishim., Sriswasdi, Ohkuma, W.Iwasaki & Sugita
- Cutaneotrichosporon suis G.Péter, Mounier, L.Garnier & Dlauchy
- Cutaneotrichosporon terricola (Sugita, M.Takash. & Nakase) Xin Zhan Liu, F.Y.Bai, M.Groenew. & Boekhout
