= White piedra =

- Other names: Tinea blanca
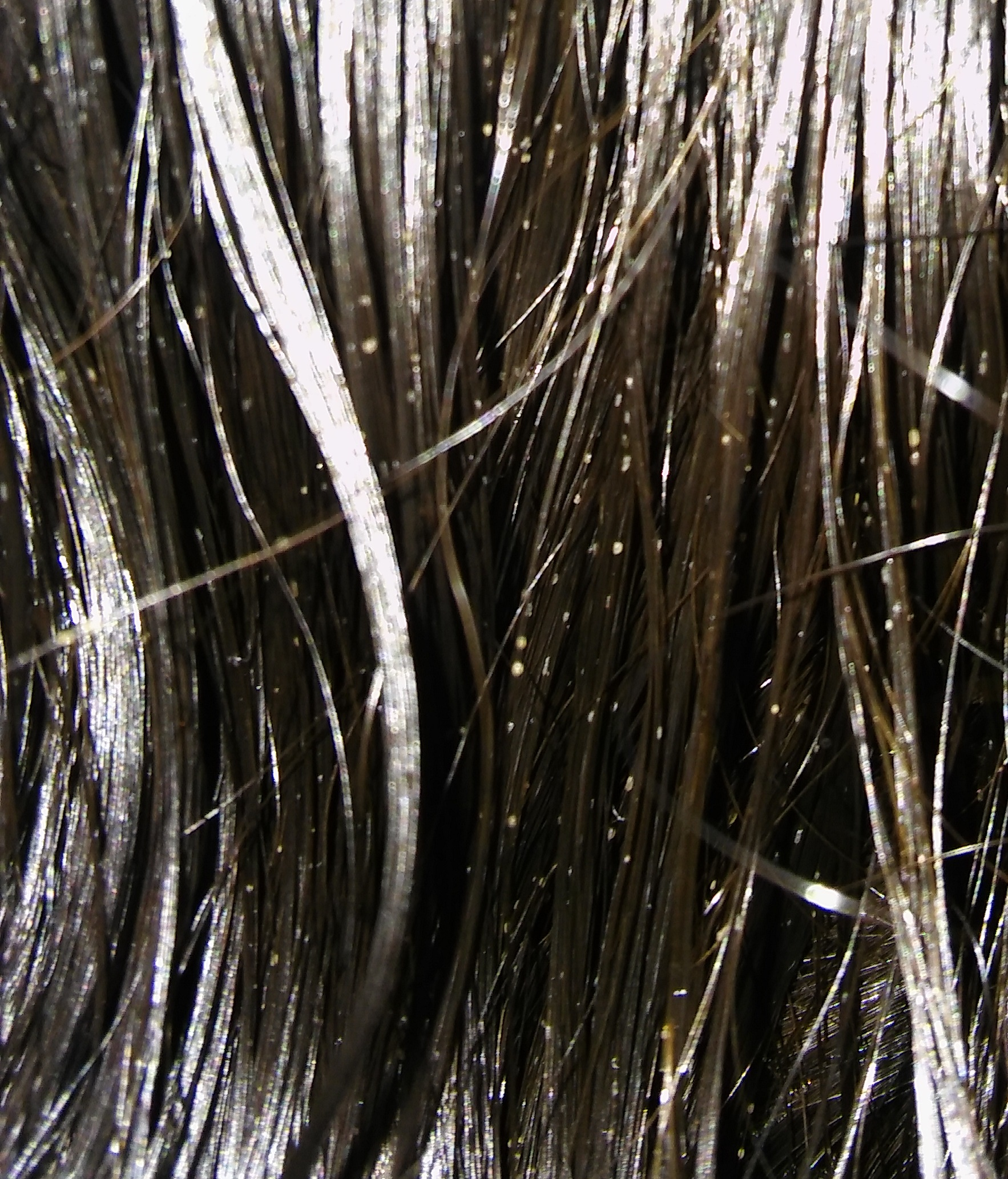
- Specialty: Infectious disease

White piedra (or tinea blanca) is a mycosis of the hair caused by several species of fungi in the genus Trichosporon. It is characterized by soft nodules composed of yeast cells and arthroconidia that encompass hair shafts.

== Signs and symptoms ==
White piedra is asymptomatic.

== Diagnosis ==
White piedra is caused by Trichosporon beigelii. White piedra can occur on the hair of the scalp; Trichosporon ovoides is likely the cause in this case. White piedra on scalp hair is rarely caused by Trichosporon inkin; pubic hair with white piedra is what T. inkin is mainly associated with. White piedra can occur on pubic hair; T. inkin likely causes this.

Trichosporon mucoides can also cause white piedra. In such cases, a periodic acid-Schiff–diastase stain and fungal culture may aid in diagnosis.

== Treatment ==
There are several approaches to treat this infectious disease. One approach involves shaving the affected areas. Another approach involves the use of antifungal medication, such as ketaconazole shampoo.

== See also ==
- Trichobacteriosis axillaris
