= Phenol 2-monooxygenase =

Class of enzymes

Identifiers
- EC no.: 1.14.13.7
- CAS no.: 37256-84-1

Databases
- BRENDA: enzyme data
- ExPASy: NiceZyme view
- KEGG: enzyme entry
- MetaCyc: metabolic pathway
- Rhea: reactions
- PDB structures: RCSB PDB PDBe PDBsum
- Gene Ontology: AmiGO / QuickGO
Search
- PMC: articles
- PubMed: articles
- NCBI: proteins

Phenol 2-monooxygenase (EC 1.14.13.7) is an enzyme that catalyzes the chemical reaction

phenol
+ NADPH + H^{+}
O_{2}
H_{2}O
catechol
+ NADP^{+}

The four substrates of this enzyme are phenol, reduced nicotinamide adenine dinucleotide phosphate (NADPH), oxygen and a proton. Its products are catechol, oxidised NADP^{+}, and water.

The enzyme is a flavin-containing monooxygenase that uses molecular oxygen as oxidant and incorporates one of its atoms into the starting material. The systematic name of this enzyme class is phenol,NADPH:oxygen oxidoreductase (2-hydroxylating). Other names in common use include phenol hydroxylase, and phenol o-hydroxylase. It uses flavin adenine dinucleotide as a cofactor. The enzyme from Trichosporon cutaneum can hydroxylate a range of phenols.

== Structural studies ==
As of late 2007, 3 structures have been solved for this class of enzymes, with PDB accession codes PDB: 1FOH, PDB: 1HQI, and PDB: 1PN0.
