= Bacillus submarinus =

Scientific classification
- Domain: Bacteria
- Kingdom: Bacillati
- Phylum: Bacillota
- Class: Bacilli
- Order: Caryophanales
- Family: Bacillaceae
- Genus: Bacillus
- Species: B. submarinus

Binomial name
- Bacillus submarinus

Species of bacterium

Bacillus submarinus is a species in the genus Bacillus, meaning it is rod shaped while being capable of producing endospores. B. submarinus is Gram +, where there is a thick layer of peptidoglycan in its cell wall.

== Description ==
Bacillus submarinus is a gram positive, aerobic meaning that it requires oxygen for metabolism. B. submarinus is a sporulating bacteria which is when the cell puts its genetic information in a spore during a cell's dormant phase, rod-shaped, bacterium of the genus Bacillus that is commonly found in the ocean at extreme depths and pressures. As with other members of the genus Bacillus, it can form an endospore a bud that contains genetic information in the chance the bacteria cell dies, later when conditions become more hospitable the bacteria returns, surviving extreme conditions.

== Habitat ==
This species is commonly found in the ocean waters, primarily in the Atlantic Ocean. Bacillus submarinus is able to live in oceans at a depth of more than 5000 m, withstanding extreme hydrostatic pressure that is above $1.1x10^8$ Pa or around 15954 Psi. In contrast, the human femur can only withstand a maximum of 1,700 Psi before shattering.

== Reproduction ==
Bacillus submarinus divide symmetrically to make two daughter cells, producing a single endospore that can remain viable for decades and is resistant to unfavourable environmental conditions such as ocean acidification. They do not reproduce like eukaryotic cells by mitosis but, a process known as binary fission. In binary fission the DNA in the prokaryote is not condensed in structures similar to chromosomes, but make a copy of the DNA and the cell divides in half.

== Uses ==
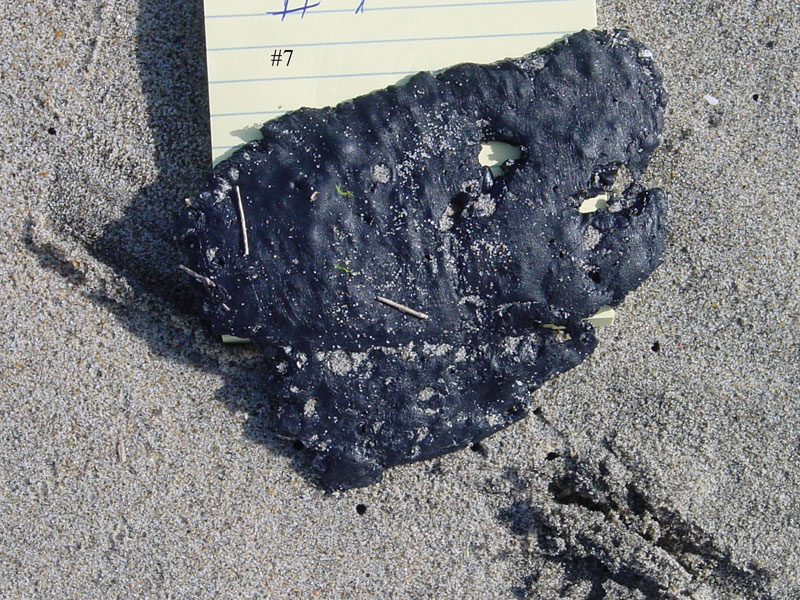
Tarball on the beach in Moss Landing Beach

Bacillus submarinus is proven to decompose oil that is found in the ocean such as after an oil spill. As B. submarinus begins the process of decomposing oil in the ocean they form tarballs. In these tarballs the B. submarinus works with other organisms such as Chromobacterium violaceum and Candida marina to change the chemical structure of the oil by decomposing it and causing the molecules in oil to bond to other materials around organism.
