= Bandonia marina =

Scientific classification
- Kingdom: Fungi
- Division: Basidiomycota
- Class: Tremellomycetes
- Order: Trichosporonales
- Family: Tetragoniomycetaceae
- Genus: Bandonia; Yurkov, Xin Zhan Liu, F.Y. Bai, M. Groenew. & Boekhout (2015)
- Species: B. marina

Binomial name
- Bandonia marina (Uden & Zobell) Yurkov, Xin Zhan Liu, F.Y. Bai, M. Groenew. & Boekhout (2015)

Synonyms
- Candida marina Uden & Zobell (1962); Cryptococcus marinus (Uden & Zobell) Golubev (1981); Vanrija marina (Uden & Zobell) R.T. Moore (1987)

Species of fungus

Bandonia marina is a species of fungus in the family Tetragoniomycetaceae, first described as Candida marina in 1962. It is currently the only species in the monotypic genus Bandonia. The species is a marine yeast and is one of the microorganisms that feed on and decompose tarballs in the ocean.
