= Geotrichosis =

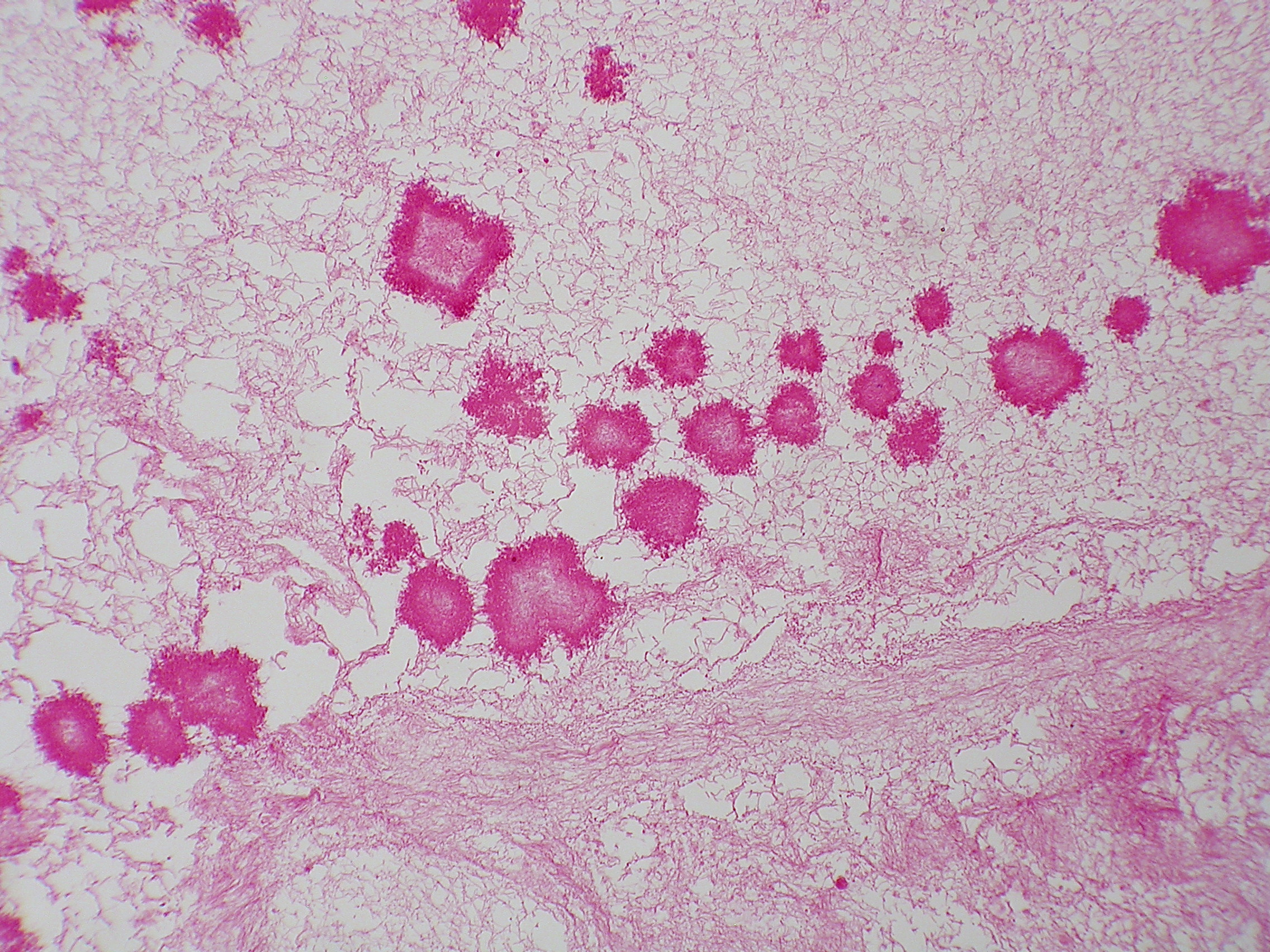
- Specialty: Infectious diseases

Geotrichosis is a mycosis caused by Geotrichum candidum.

== Human colonization and disease ==
Geotrichum candidum is also a frequent member of the human microbiome, notably associated with skin, sputum and feces where it occurs in 25-30% of specimens. The fungus can cause an infection known as geotrichosis, affecting the oral, bronchial, skin and bronchopulmonary epithelia. The inoculum may arise from endogenous or exogenous sources.

In 1847 Bennett described Geotrichum candidum causing a superinfection in the tuberculous cavity. Bennett was able to differentiate infection by Geotrichum candidum from candidiasis, and diagnose the first case of geotrichosis. Other early medical case reports in 1916 and 1928 also described lung infections. Most cases affect the bronchopulmonary tree, although other sites can be involved, such as oral mucosa and vagina. Skin and gut infections are also known. Reported cases of geotrichosis have been characterized with symptoms of chronic or acute bronchitis. Exogenous geotrichosis may arise from contact with contaminated soil, fruits or dairy products.

- Pulmonary geotrichosis is the most frequent form of geotrichosis. The symptoms appear to be secondary symptoms of tuberculosis. This includes symptoms such as light, thick, grey sputum, which in some cases may be blood-tinged. Patients often have a cough that produces clear or yellow sputum. Another symptom of pulmonary geotrichosis includes fine to medium rales. Patients may develop fever, rapid pulse and leukocytosis. The condition appears chronic with the presence of a little debilitation and fever. There is no chest pain and occasional wheezing can occur.
- Bronchial geotrichosis does not involve the lung instead the disease persists within the bronchial. Geotrichum candidum grows in the lumen of the bronchi. The disease is characterized as an endobronchial infection. Bronchial geotrichosis is similar to the allergic reaction of aspergillosis. Symptoms include prominent chronic cough, gelatinous sputum, lack of fever and medium to coarse rales. Patients with the bronchial condition their pulse and respiration are rarely elevated. Fine mottling may be present in the middle or basilar pulmonary region. Colonization of the bronchi can be associated with Candida albicans and usually occur with patients with chronic obstructive lung disease.
- Oral and vaginal geotrichosis is similar to thrush in its appearances and was often confused with this infection. The difference between oral and vaginal geotrichosis can be determined using microscope analysis. The infected area forms a white plaque and patients usually report burning sensation in the affected areas. The vaginal geotrichosis is more common in pregnant women and is often associated with vaginitis.
- Gastrointestinal geotrichosis is enterocolitis associated with glutamic therapy. The symptoms usually stop once the glutamic therapy is discontinued. Establishment of the etiology of the fungi is difficult since G. candidum is found within the gut normal flora. The difference between normal gut flora form and the disease causing form is the production of toxins.
- Cutaneous geotrichosis has two different types of variants which include superficial and deep infection. The superficial form the infection occurs on skin folds including submammary, inguinal, perianal and interdigital folds. The deep form develops nodules, tumours and ulcers on legs, face and hands. Geotrichosis can cause a cystic lesion appears as soft tissue on the skin.

== Diagnosis ==
=== Laboratory culture ===
The diagnoses of geotrichosis cannot be determined without using culture or microscopic measurements. The laboratory diagnosis of geotrichosis involves collected fungi samples areas of infections without contamination. Scraping of the mouth lesions and the ulcers can provide a sample of G. candidum. Samples can also be collected from pus and mucus can be obtained from the feces. Sputum can be searched for the mucoid-like white flakes for further examination. Culturing the cylindrical barrel-shaped or elliptical fungi in considerable numbers in oral lesions is an indicator that a patient may have geotrichosis. Under the microscope the fungi appears yeast-like and septate branching hyphae that can be broken down into chains or individual arthrospores. Arthrospores appear rectangular with flat or rounded ends. Under the microscope the arthroconidia size range from 6-12μm x 3-6μm. Arthroconidia and coarse true hyphae can be observed can be observed under the microscope. Another identification method for G. candidum is selective isolation method. A selection isolation method based on the fungi tolerance to novobiocin and carbon dioxide can determine if G. candidum is the cause of illness.

=== Diagnostic imaging ===
X-rays can be used to examine the lung tissue, however it can not be used to positively diagnose geotrichosis. X-rays may show cavitation that is located the walls of the lungs tissues. The lung tissue resemble the early signs of tuberculosis. The results of an x-ray examination of pulmonary geotrichosis presents smooth, dense patchy infiltrations and some cavities. Bronchial geotrichosis shows peribronchial thickening with fine mottling may be present on middle or basilar pulmonary fields. Bronchial geotrichosis usually present itself as non-specific diffuse peribronchical infiltration.

== Treatment ==
Geotrichosis generally has a good prognosis and patients generally have successful recovery. However, there is not a standard treatment for geotrichosis. There are several types of antimicrobial or antifungal compounds that can be used for geotrichosis treatment. Another method of treatment involves symptomatic care, bed rest, iodine therapy, aerosol nystatin and amphotericin B. Azole drugs including isoconazole and clotrimazole are used for geotrichosis treatment. Associated treatment for pulmonary geotrichosis includes the use of potassium iodide, sulfonamides or colistin. The associated asthma can be treated with desensitization and prednisolone. Amphotericin B, clotrimazole and S-fluorocytosine have become more susceptible to G. candidum. Antimycotic resistance can appear due to repeated treatment.
