= Tryptophanyl aminopeptidase =

Class of enzymes

Identifiers
- EC no.: 3.4.11.17
- CAS no.: 76689-19-5

Databases
- IntEnz: IntEnz view
- BRENDA: BRENDA entry
- ExPASy: NiceZyme view
- KEGG: KEGG entry
- MetaCyc: metabolic pathway
- PRIAM: profile
- PDB structures: RCSB PDB PDBe PDBsum
Search
- PMC: articles
- PubMed: articles
- NCBI: proteins

Tryptophanyl aminopeptidase (EC 3.4.11.17, tryptophan aminopeptidase, L-tryptophan aminopeptidase) is an enzyme. This enzyme catalyses the following chemical reaction

Preferential release of N-terminal tryptophan

This enzyme from Trichosporon cutaneum also acts on L-tryptophanamide.
