= Tarball (oil) =

Blob of petroleum from the ocean

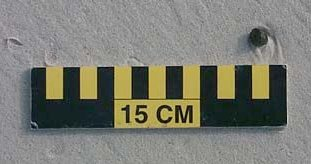
A tarball on a beach on the Galápagos Islands in 2001, from an oil spill from the tanker Jessica.

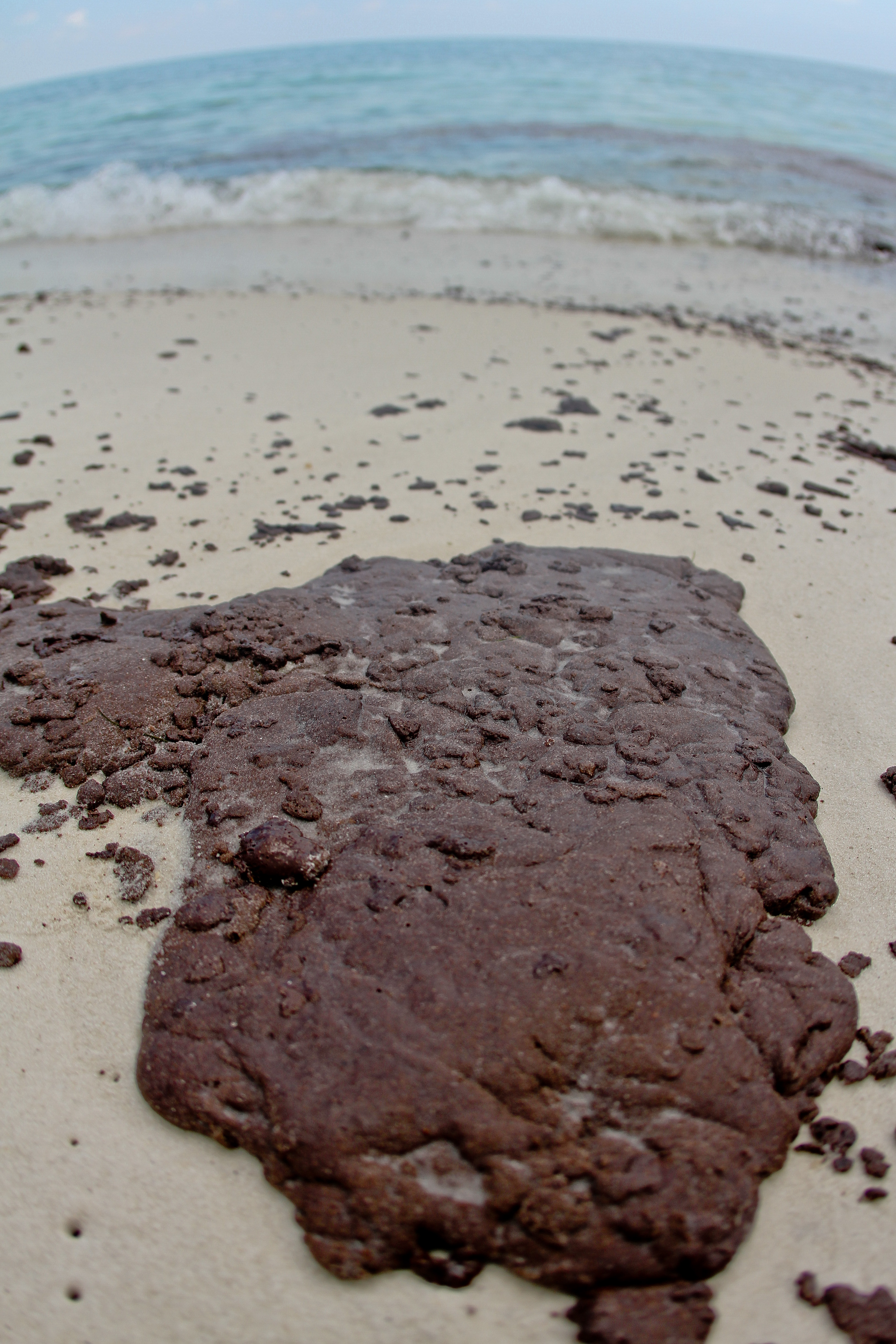
Tar balls from the Deepwater Horizon oil spill washed ashore on Okaloosa Island in Fort Walton Beach, Florida on June 16, 2010

A tarball is a blob of petroleum which has been weathered after floating in the ocean. Tarballs are an aquatic pollutant in most environments, although they can occur naturally and as such are not always associated with oil spills.

== Distribution ==
Tarballs may be dispersed over long distances by deep sea currents. The density of tarballs depends on the solids picked up in the weathering process. They can range in density with some being more dense than seawater, which, at 1.025 g/ml, is more dense than the density of fresh water. When the tarballs are less dense than seawater, they can travel over great distances.

They can also be contained like oil and picked up using a variety of methods. Containment booms can be used to isolate tarballs similar to methods used to isolate oil.

== Geoecology ==
Tarball concentration and features have been used to assess the extent of oil spills and their composition can also be used to identify their sources of origin. They are slowly decomposed by microorganisms such as Chromobacterium violaceum, Cladosporium resinae, Bacillus submarinus, Micrococcus varians, Pseudomonas aeruginosa, Candida marina, and Saccharomyces estuari.
