= Dipodascopsis =

Scientific classification
- Kingdom: Fungi
- Division: Ascomycota
- Class: Lipomycetes
- Order: Lipomycetales
- Family: Lipomycetaceae
- Genus: Dipodascopsis; L.R. Batra & Millner

Type species
- Dipodascopsis uninucleata (Biggs) L.R. Batra & Millner

Genus of fungi

Dipodascopsis is a genus of fungi in the family Lipomycetaceae.
