= Arthrographis =

Scientific classification
- Kingdom: Fungi
- Division: Ascomycota
- Class: Dothideomycetes
- Family: Eremomycetaceae
- Genus: Arthrographis; G.Cochet ex. Sigler & J.W.Carmich. (1976)

Type species
- Arthrographis kalrae (R.P.Tewari & Macph.) Sigler & J.W.Carmich.

Species
- Arthrographis alba Arthrographis kalrae Arthrographis lignicola Arthrographis pinicola

Genus of fungi

Arthrographis is a genus of fungi that are widespread in the environment and occasionally cause infection in animals. Arthrographis species have been found worldwide in samples from air, compost, marine sediment, soil, wood, and human infection.

The genus was first described by G. Cochet in 1976, with the type species being Arthrographis kalrae
