= Tetragoniomycetaceae =

Scientific classification
- Kingdom: Fungi
- Division: Basidiomycota
- Class: Tremellomycetes
- Order: Trichosporonales
- Family: Tetragoniomycetaceae; Oberw. & Bandoni (1981)

Genera
- Bandonia; Cryptotrichosporon; Takashimella; Tetragoniomyces

Family of fungi

The Tetragoniomycetaceae are a family of fungi in the order Trichosporonales. The family currently contains four genera. Several species are only known from their yeast states.
