= Tryptophanamidase =

Class of enzymes

tryptophanamidase

Identifiers
- EC no.: 3.5.1.57
- CAS no.: 76689-19-5

Databases
- BRENDA: enzyme data
- ExPASy: NiceZyme view
- KEGG: enzyme entry
- MetaCyc: metabolic pathway
- Rhea: reactions
- PDB structures: RCSB PDB PDBe PDBsum
- Gene Ontology: AmiGO / QuickGO
Search
- PMC: articles
- PubMed: articles
- NCBI: proteins

Tryptophanamidase (EC 3.5.1.57) is an enzyme characterised from Trichosporon cutaneum that catalyzes the hydrolysis of tryptophanamide to the amino acid, tryptophan, and ammonia:

tryptophanamide
H_{2}O
NH_{3}
tryptophan

This enzyme is a hydrolase, one acting on carbon-nitrogen bonds other than peptide bonds, specifically in linear amides. The systematic name of this enzyme class is L-tryptophanamide amidohydrolase. Other names in common use include tryptophan aminopeptidase, and L-tryptophan aminopeptidase. It requires manganese as Mn^{2+}.
