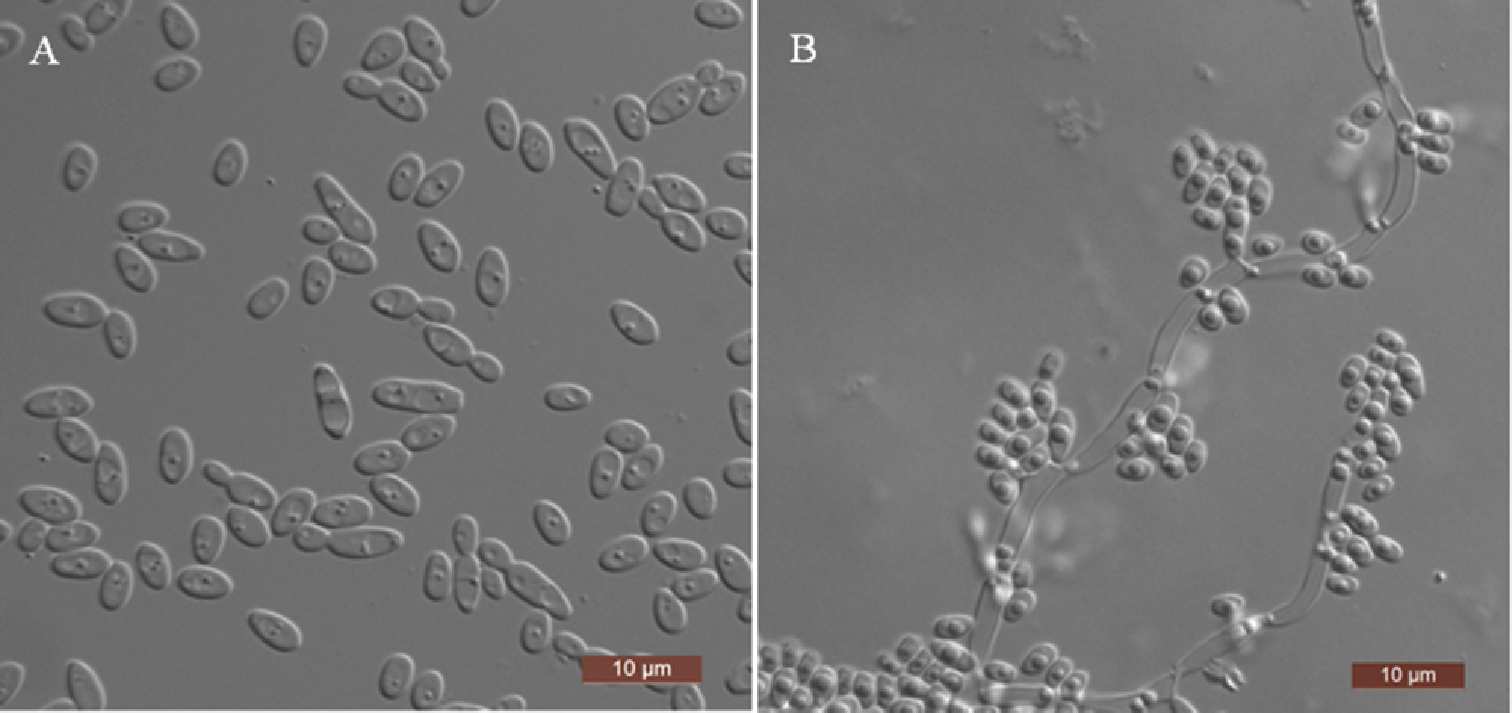
- Sugiyamaella yunanensis

Scientific classification
- Kingdom: Fungi
- Division: Ascomycota
- Class: Dipodascomycetes
- Order: Dipodascales
- Family: Trichomonascaceae; Kurtzman & Robnett

Type genus
- Trichomonascus H.S. Jackson

Genera
- Sugiyamaella; Trichomonascus; Stephanoascus; Wickerhamiella; Zygoascus

= Trichomonascaceae =

Family of fungi

Trichomonascaceae is a family of fungi in the order Saccharomycetales. According to the 2007 Outline of Ascomycota, the family contains 5 genera.
