= Endomyces =

Scientific classification
- Kingdom: Fungi
- Division: Ascomycota
- Class: Dipodascomycetes
- Order: Dipodascales
- Family: Dipodascaceae
- Genus: Endomyces; Reess

Type species
- Endomyces decipiens (Tul. & C. Tul.) Reess (1870)

Genus of fungi

Endomyces is a genus of fungi in the family Dipodascaceae.
