= Arthrobacter luteus =

Scientific classification
- Domain: Bacteria
- Kingdom: Bacillati
- Phylum: Actinomycetota
- Class: Actinomycetes
- Order: Micrococcales
- Family: Micrococcaceae
- Genus: Arthrobacter
- Species: A. luteus

Binomial name
- Arthrobacter luteus Kaneko et al. 1969

Species of bacterium in the family Micrococcaceae

Arthrobacter luteus (ALU) is a species of gram-positive bacteria in the genus Arthrobacter. A. luteus is facultatively anaerobic, pleomorphic, branching, non-motile, non-sporulating, non-acid-fast, catalase-positive, and rod-shaped (0.6–1.0 μm × 0.8–10.0 μm).

A restriction endonuclease enzyme is extracted from the bacterium and acts at the centre of a palindromic tetranucleotide sequence to give even-ended duplex DNA fragments phosphorylated at the 5'-end. The restriction site Alu-I itself is a 4-base cutter: AG/CT. The Alu retrotransposon is named after the bacterium's abbreviation. The bacterium is also used to produce zymolyase, which can degrade yeast cell wall.

== Background ==
Arthrobacter luteus was isolated from brewery sewage in research done in Takasaki, Japan in 1969. The team studied the bacteria isolated taxonomically and found them to be gram-positive, facultatively anaerobic, pleomorphic, branching, non-motile, non-sporulating, non-acid-fast, and catalase-positive rods. The bacteria also reduced nitrate, hydrolyzed starch and liquefied gelatin along with producing acids from carbohydrates. They then compared the isolated bacteria with 18 other strands of similar microorganisms and found to be in the genus Arthrobacter, but no specific species was corresponded. Thus, the name "Arthrobacter luteus" was given to the isolates.

== Research ==
An endonuclease restriction, which is a protein produced by bacteria that cleaves DNA at specific sites along the molecule, that occurs from Arthrobacter luteus has been isolated and the nucleotide sequence at the cleave site of the restriction isolated. The cleavage occurs at the center of the palindromic tetranucleotide sequence, which gives even-ended duplex DNA fragments phosphorylated at the 5’-end. A palindromic tetranucleotide is a sequence with 4 nucleotides that are able to be read the same backward as it is forwards. The restriction endonuclease cleaves SV40 form I DNA into 32 fragments, this is quite unusual since most others cleave much fewer than this. The Alu will then be used to digest the SV40 DNA. The fragments have been able to be arranged so that the physical cleavage map of the SV40 genome can be shown.

== Characteristics of Arthrobacter luteus ==
Morphological, physiological, and biochemical characteristics of Arthrobacter luteus are shown in the table below.

| Test type | Test | Characteristics |
|---|---|---|
| Colony characters | Color | Yellow |
| Colony characters | Shape | Rod |
| Colony characters | Temperature for growth (°C) | 30-37 |
| Colony characters | pH range for growth | 7.0-8.0 |
| Colony characters | NaCl tolerance (%, w/v) | 7 |
| Morphological characters | Shape | Rod-Coccus |
| Physiological characters | Motility | No |
| Physiological characters | Growth at 6.5% NaCl | Yes |
| Biochemical characters | Gram staining | + |
| Biochemical characters | Catalase | + |
| Biochemical characters | Motility | - |
| Biochemical characters | Indole | - |
| Biochemical characters | Urease | ± |
| Biochemical characters | Nitrate Reduction | + |
| Hydrolysis of | Gelatin | + |
| Hydrolysis of | Starch | + |
| Acid production from | Arabinose | + |
| Acid production from | Xylose | + |
| Acid production from | Glucose | + |
| Acid production from | Mannose | + |
| Acid production from | Fructose | + |
| Acid production from | Galactose | + |
| Acid production from | Lactose | + |
| Acid production from | Maltose | + |
| Acid production from | Saccharose | + |
| Acid production from | Mannitol | - |
| Acid production from | Glycerol | + |
| Acid production from | Inulin | + |

Note:

+ = Positive

- = Negative

± = Slight Production
