= Sporopachydermia =

Scientific classification
- Kingdom: Fungi
- Division: Ascomycota
- Class: Sporopachydermiomycetes
- Order: Sporopachydermiales
- Family: Sporopachydermiaceae
- Genus: Sporopachydermia; Rodr. Mir. (1978)

Species
- Sporopachydermia cereana; Sporopachydermia lactativora; Sporopachydermia quercuum

Genus of fungi

Sporopachydermia is a genus of fungi in the family Sporopachydermiaceae.
