= Eremomycetaceae =

Scientific classification
- Kingdom: Fungi
- Division: Ascomycota
- Class: Dothideomycetes
- Subclass: incertae sedis
- Family: Eremomycetaceae; Malloch & Cain (1971)

Type genus
- Eremomyces Malloch & Cain (1971)

Genera
- Arthrographis; Eremomyces; Rhexothecium

Family of fungi

The Eremomycetaceae are a family of fungi with an uncertain taxonomic placement in the class Dothideomycetes.
