= Gustav Behrend =

German dermatologist

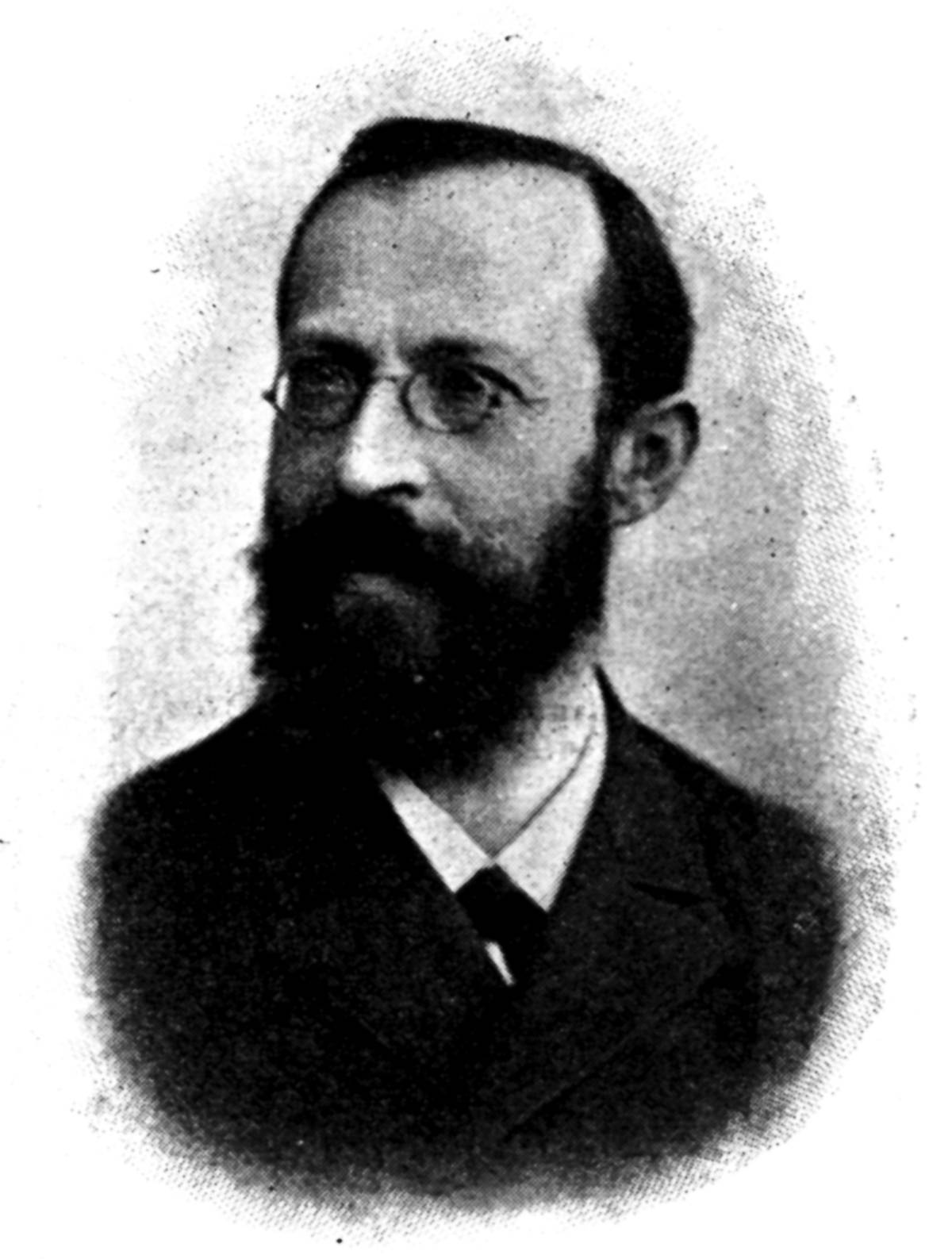
Gustav Behrend (1847–1925)

Gustav Behrend (10 January 1847 – 1925) was a German dermatologist who was a native of Neustettin (today- Szczecinek, Poland).

In 1870 he received his medical doctorate at the University of Berlin, and during the Franco-Prussian War, he served as an assistant at the Reserve Lazareth in Berlin. In 1882 he became a lecturer at Berlin, and in 1891 was appointed chief physician at the Municipal Dispensary for Sexual Diseases. In 1897 he received the title of professor.

Behrend specialized in the fields of dermatology and syphilology, also dealing with the subject of prostitution. He was the author of numerous publications, including a well-regarded textbook on skin diseases, titled Lehrbuch der Hautkrankheiten (1883). He also contributed a number of articles to Albert Eulenburg's Real-Encyclopädie der gesamten Heilkunde.

== Selected written works ==
- Ueber Erythema Exsudativum Multiforme Universale, (1877) - On erythema exudativum multiforme.
- Pemphigus, Syphilis Hæmorrhagica etc., (1879) - Pemphigus, syphilis hemorrhagica.
- Ueber Pityriasis, zur Lehre von der Vererbung der Syphilis etc., (1881) - On pityriasis.
- Über vaccinale Hauteruptionen (1881) - On vaccinal skin eruptions.
- Lehrbuch der Hautkrankheiten, (1883) - Textbook of skin diseases.
- Ueber Komplikation von Impetigo Contagiosa und Herpes Tonsurans, (1884) - On impetigo contagiosa and herpes tonsurans.
- Wirkung des Lanolin bei Hautkrankheiten etc., (1886) - Effects of lanolin for skin diseases.
- Ueber Anthrarobin, (1888) - On anthrarobin.
- Nervenläsion und Haarausfall, (1889) - Nerve damage and hair loss.
- Ueber die Gonorrhoebehandlung Prostituirter, (1898) - Treatment of gonorrhea in prostitution.
