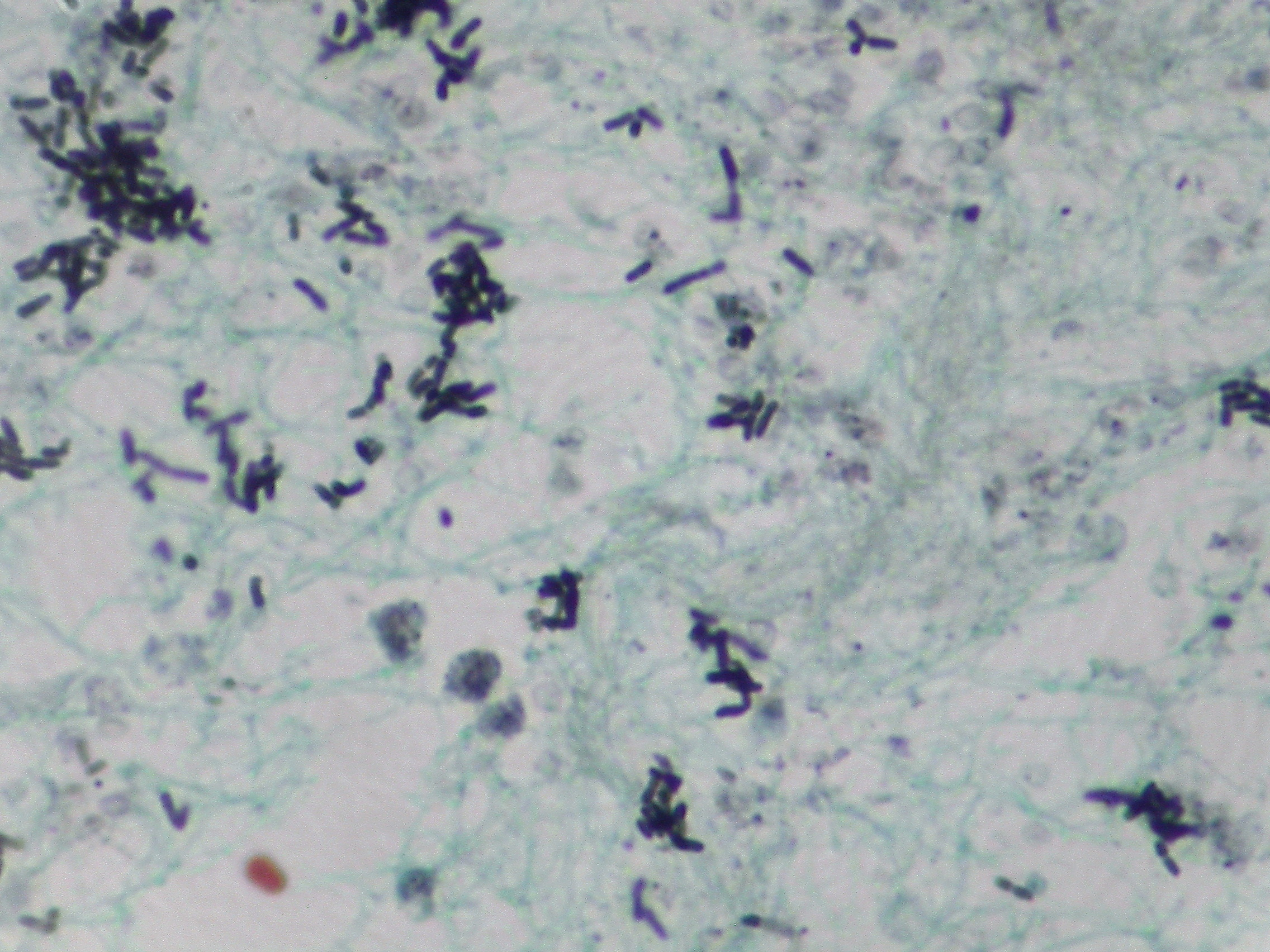
- Geotrichum candidum

Scientific classification
- Kingdom: Fungi
- Division: Ascomycota
- Class: Dipodascomycetes
- Order: Dipodascales
- Family: Dipodascaceae
- Genus: Geotrichum; Link, 1809

Species
- See text

= Geotrichum =

Genus of fungi

Geotrichum is a genus of fungi found worldwide in soil, water, air, and sewage, as well as in plants, cereals, and dairy products; it is also commonly found in normal human flora and is isolated from sputum and feces. It was first described in 1809 by Johann Heinrich Friedrich Link.

The genus Geotrichum includes over 100 species. Some are welcome and even considered desirable. For example, skilled cheesemakers create conditions favorable for the formation of a Geotrichum candidum rind on certain goat's milk and cow's milk cheeses, proudly declaring the rind to be the most flavorful part of such cheeses. Another example is the presence of some Geotrichum species in fermented poi.

The most clinically relevant species is Saprochaeta capitata, formerly known as Geotrichum capitatum, with most cases occurring in Europe.

Saprochaete clavata, formerly known as Geotrichum clavatum, is an uncommon infection that has been associated with sporadic outbreaks. Geotrichum candidum is closely related to Saprochaeta sp., rarely isolated but may cause invasive and disseminated disease with high mortality yeast-like and mold-like strains have been identified.

The most important risk factor for invasive fungal infection related to Geotrichum is severe immunosuppression, especially in hematological malignancies as acute leukemia, associated with profound and prolonged neutropenia.

Fungemia is very common, often with deep organ involvement (lung, liver, spleen, and central nervous system) and also skin and mucous membranes lesions. There is no optimal treatment for Geotrichum infections but based on existing data guidelines recommend amphotericin B with or without co-administered flucytosine or with voriconazole showing good in vitro susceptibility.

Mortality associated with Geotrichum-related infections is high, ranging from 57% to 80%.

Increasing the knowledge on Geotrichum related invasive fungal infections may improve early diagnosis and adequate treatment of these severe infections.

== History ==
The genus Geotrichum was described by Johann Heinrich Friedrich Link in 1809 to accommodate the species G. candidum found on decaying leaves. Since then, over 130 taxa have been described in the genus, and hundreds of synonyms have been generated. For example G. candidum was misclassified as the Oidium lactis in much early literature. Species of Geotrichum resemble the genera Trichosporon and Protendomycopsis; however, Geotrichum is of ascomycetous affiliation whereas the latter are members of the Basidiomycota. Species of Geotrichum are occasionally mistaken for fast growing members of the genus Dipodascus, which are characterized by irregularly branched, 10–14 μm wide hyphae and the production of single-spored asci. However, unlike Geotrichum, members of the genus Dipodascus lack dichotomous branching of the peripheral hyphae and their growth rates are generally less than 3 mm per day.

== Species ==
As of March 2026, Species Fungorum recognizes 37 species.

- Geotrichum aggregatum
- Geotrichum albidum
- Geotrichum australiense
- Geotrichum bipunctatum
- Geotrichum bostonense
- Geotrichum byssinum
- Geotrichum candidum Link 1809
- Geotrichum cerebrinum
- Geotrichum coccophilum
- Geotrichum dehoogii
- Geotrichum doliiforme
- Geotrichum enheduannae
- Geotrichum europaeum
- Geotrichum fici
- Geotrichum flexuosum
- Geotrichum fujianense
- Geotrichum funiculosum
- Geotrichum galactomycetum
- Geotrichum geniculatum
- Geotrichum giganteum
- Geotrichum hubeiense
- Geotrichum keratinophilum
- Geotrichum macrosporum
- Geotrichum magnum
- Geotrichum maricola
- Geotrichum pandrosioniae
- Geotrichum psychrophilum
- Geotrichum rectangulatum
- Geotrichum reessii
- Geotrichum silvicola
- Geotrichum sinense
- Geotrichum smithiae
- Geotrichum sulfureum
- Geotrichum tetrasporum
- Geotrichum vanryiae
- Geotrichum xishuangbannaense
- Geotrichum zingiberis-saccharati

In 2018, Mycobank additionally listed the following species:

- Geotrichum amycelicum
- Geotrichum beigelii
- Geotrichum brocianum
- Geotrichum cinereum
- Geotrichum cyphellae
- Geotrichum dombrayi
- Geotrichum fragrans
- Geotrichum ghanense
- Geotrichum hirtum
- Geotrichum kieta
- Geotrichum membranogenes
- Geotrichum multifermentans
- Geotrichum muyaga
- Geotrichum mycoderma
- Geotrichum nobile
- Geotrichum nyabisi
- Geotrichum pararugosum
- Geotrichum phurueaense
- Geotrichum phurueaensis
- Geotrichum rabesalama
- Geotrichum siamense
- Geotrichum siamensis
- Geotrichum sphaeroides
- Geotrichum spheroides
- Geotrichum subtile
- Geotrichum variabile
- Geotrichum variabilis
- Geotrichum virulens
- Geotrichum vulgaris
