= Lipomyces =

Scientific classification
- Kingdom: Fungi
- Division: Ascomycota
- Class: Lipomycetes
- Order: Lipomycetales
- Family: Lipomycetaceae
- Genus: Lipomyces; Lodder & Kreger

Type species
- Lipomyces starkeyi Lodder & Kreger-van Rij

Genus of fungi

Lipomyces is a genus of oleaginous yeast in the family Lipomycetaceae.

The genus Lipomyces comprises at least 30 species, many of which can be isolated from the soil from around the world.

Lipomyces starkeyi is known to produce large amounts of lipids, and is used in research for potential use as feedstock for biodiesel production.
