= Dipodascus =

Scientific classification
- Kingdom: Fungi
- Division: Ascomycota
- Class: Dipodascomycetes
- Order: Dipodascales
- Family: Dipodascaceae
- Genus: Dipodascus; Lagerh.

Type species
- Dipodascus albidus Lagerh. (1892)

Species
- Dipodascus ambrosiae de Hoog, M.T. Sm. & E. Guého 1986; Dipodascus armillariae W. Gams 1983; Dipodascus capitatus de Hoog, M.T. Sm. & E. Guého 1986; Dipodascus carabidarus (S.O. Suh & M. Blackw.) S.O. Suh & M. Blackw. 2015; Dipodascus cucujoidarus (S.O. Suh & M. Blackw.) S.O. Suh & M. Blackw. 2015; Dipodascus eriensis (L.R. Hedrick & P.D. Dupont) S.O. Suh & M. Blackw. 2015; Dipodascus fermentans (Diddens & Lodder) P.M. Kirk 2015; Dipodascus histeridarus (S.O. Suh & M. Blackw.) S.O. Suh & M. Blackw. 2015; Dipodascus hypatiae Y.P. Tan, Bishop-Hurley, Marney, E. Lacey & R.G. Shivas 2023; Dipodascus ingens de Hoog, M.T. Sm. & E. Guého 1997; Dipodascus klebahnii (Stautz) P.M. Kirk 2015; Dipodascus magnusii (F. Ludw.) Arx 1978; Dipodascus ovetensis (Peláez & C. Ramírez) Arx 1977; Dipodascus restrictus (de Hoog & M.T. Sm.) P.M. Kirk 2015; Dipodascus solani Av.-Saccá 1920; Dipodascus spicifer de Hoog, M.T. Sm. & E. Guého 1986; Dipodascus starmeri Phaff, Blue, Hagler & Kurtzman 1997; Dipodascus tetraspermus (Macy & M.W. Mill.) Arx 1978

Genus of fungi

Dipodascus is a genus of fungi in the family Dipodascaceae.
