= Trichosporonosis =

Fungal infection

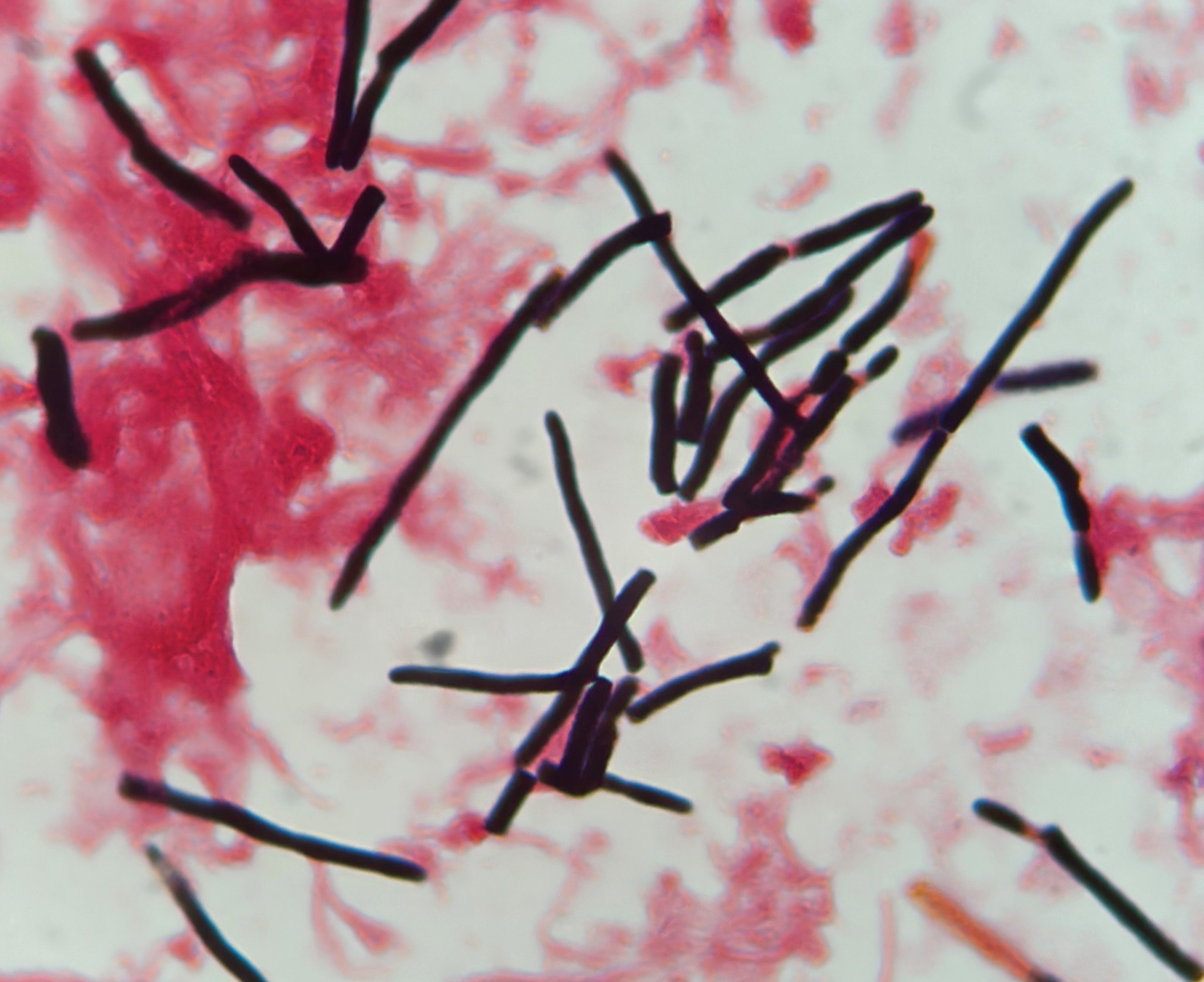
- Specialty: Infectious disease, dermatology
- Risk factors: Immunodeficiency
- Diagnostic method: Qualitative PCR

Trichosporonosis is a disease associated with fungi in the genus Trichosporon. It most commonly presents as an infection of hair roots in the skin, causing roughening and loss of hair; this superficial form is also called white piedra. In immunocompromised people, trichosporonosis may progress to an invasive and systemic form which may be life-threatening. In immunocompetent adults, the risk of white piedra progressing to invasive disease is exceptionally low.

Treatment of systemic trichosporonosis is often difficult, as Trichosporon species are known to be resistant to most antifungal drugs. Newer triazoles, such as voriconazole, have been reported to have higher efficacy in treatment. A common clinical regimen for the treatment of invasive or severe cutaneous trichosporonosis is a combination of voriconazole, micafungin, and amphotericin B.
