= Trichosporonaceae =

Scientific classification
- Kingdom: Fungi
- Division: Basidiomycota
- Class: Tremellomycetes
- Order: Trichosporonales
- Family: Trichosporonaceae; Nann. (1934)

Genera
- Apiotrichum; Cutaneotrichosporon; Effuseotrichosporon; Haglerozyma; Trichosporon; Vanrija

Synonyms
- Asterotremellaceae Prillinger et al. (2007)

Family of fungi

The Trichosporonaceae are a family of fungi in the order Trichosporonales. The family currently contains six genera. Species are not known to produce basidiocarps (fruit bodies), but exist as yeasts or produce septate hyphae with arthroconidia. Several species are human pathogens.
