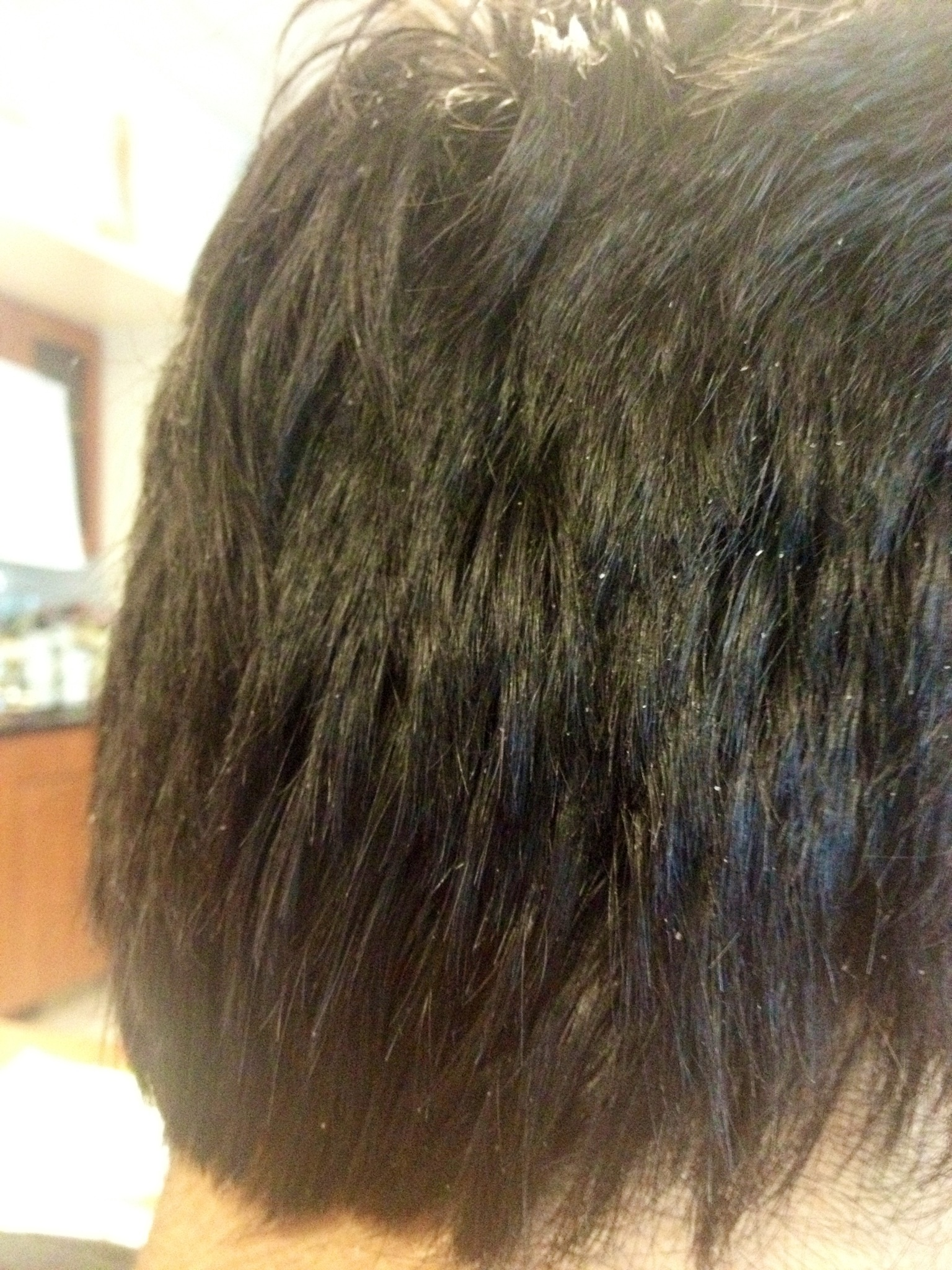
- A typical case of severe dandruff and dry scalp

Scientific classification
- Kingdom: Fungi
- Division: Basidiomycota
- Class: Tremellomycetes
- Order: Trichosporonales
- Family: Trichosporonaceae
- Genus: Trichosporon; Behrend (1890)

Type species
- Trichosporon beigelii (Küchenm. & Rabenh.) Vuill.

= Trichosporon =

Genus of fungi

Trichosporon is a genus of anamorphic fungi in the family Trichosporonaceae. All species of Trichosporon are yeasts with no known teleomorphs (sexual states). Most are typically isolated from soil, but several species occur as a natural part of the skin microbiota of humans and other animals. Proliferation of Trichosporon yeasts in the hair can lead to an unpleasant but non-serious condition known as white piedra. Trichosporon species can also cause severe opportunistic infections (trichosporonosis) in immunocompromised individuals.

== Taxonomy ==
The genus was first described by the German dermatologist Gustav Behrend in 1890, based on yeasts isolated from the hairs of a moustache where they were causing the condition known as "white piedra". Behrend called his new species Trichosporon ovoides. Friedrich Küchenmeister and Rabenhorst had, however, previously described a species in 1867 from the hairs of a wig. They thought that the organism was an alga and placed it in the genus Pleurococcus as Pleurococcus beigelii. The French mycologist Vuillemin later realized it was a yeast and transferred it to the genus Trichosporon, considering it to be an earlier name for Trichosporon ovoides.

Over 100 additional yeast species were referred to Trichosporon by later authors. With the advent of DNA sequencing, however, it became clear that many of these additional species belonged in other genera. Based on cladistic analysis of DNA sequences, 12 species are now accepted in the genus.

DNA sequencing has also shown that white piedra can be caused by more than one Trichoporon species. As a result, Trichosporon beigelii has become a name of uncertain application. McPartland & Goff selected a neotype strain that makes T. beigelii synonymous with Cutaneotrichosporon cutaneum. Guého and others, however, have argued that T. beigelii should be discarded (as a dubious name) and Behrend's original T. ovoides (for which a neotype strain has also been selected) should become the type. As a result of this uncertainty, the name T. beigelii is now obsolete.

== Description and habitat ==
Trichosporon species are distinguished microscopically by having yeast cells that germinate to produce hyaline hyphae that disarticulate at the septa, the hyphal compartments acting as arthroconidia (asexual propagules). No teleomorphic (sexual) states are known.

Species of Trichosporon and related genera are widespread and have been isolated from a wide range of substrates, including human hair (Trichosporon ovoides), soil (Cutaneotrichosporon guehoae), cabbages (Apiotrichum brassicae), cheese (T. caseorum), scarab beetles (Apiotrichum scarabaeorum), parrot droppings (T. coremiiforme), and sea water (Cutaneotrichosporon dermatis).

== Human pathogens ==
Several Trichosporon species occur naturally as part of the microbiota of human skin. Occasionally, particularly in circumstances of high humidity, the fungus can proliferate, causing an unpleasant but harmless hair condition known as white piedra. Soft, pale nodules containing yeast cells and arthroconidia form on hairs of the scalp and body. The species responsible include Trichosporon ovoides, T. inkin, T. asahii, Cutaneotrichosporon mucoides, T. asteroides, and Cutaneotrichosporon cutaneum. The obsolete name T. beigelii was formerly applied to all or any of these species.

Much more serious opportunistic infections, collectively called trichosporonosis, have been reported in immunocompromised individuals. Species said to be agents of trichosporonosis are T. asahii, T. asteroides, Cutaneotrichosporon cutaneum, Cutaneotrichosporon dermatis, T. dohaense, T. inkin, Apiotrichum loubieri, Cutaneotrichosporon mucoides, and T. ovoides.

== Species ==
- Trichosporon aquatile
- Trichosporon asahii
- Trichosporon asteroides
- Trichosporon austroamericanum
- Trichosporon caseorum
- Trichosporon coremiiforme
- Trichosporon dohaense
- Trichosporon faecale
- Trichosporon inkin
- Trichosporon insectorum
- Trichosporon japonicum
- Trichosporon lactis
- Trichosporon ovoides
