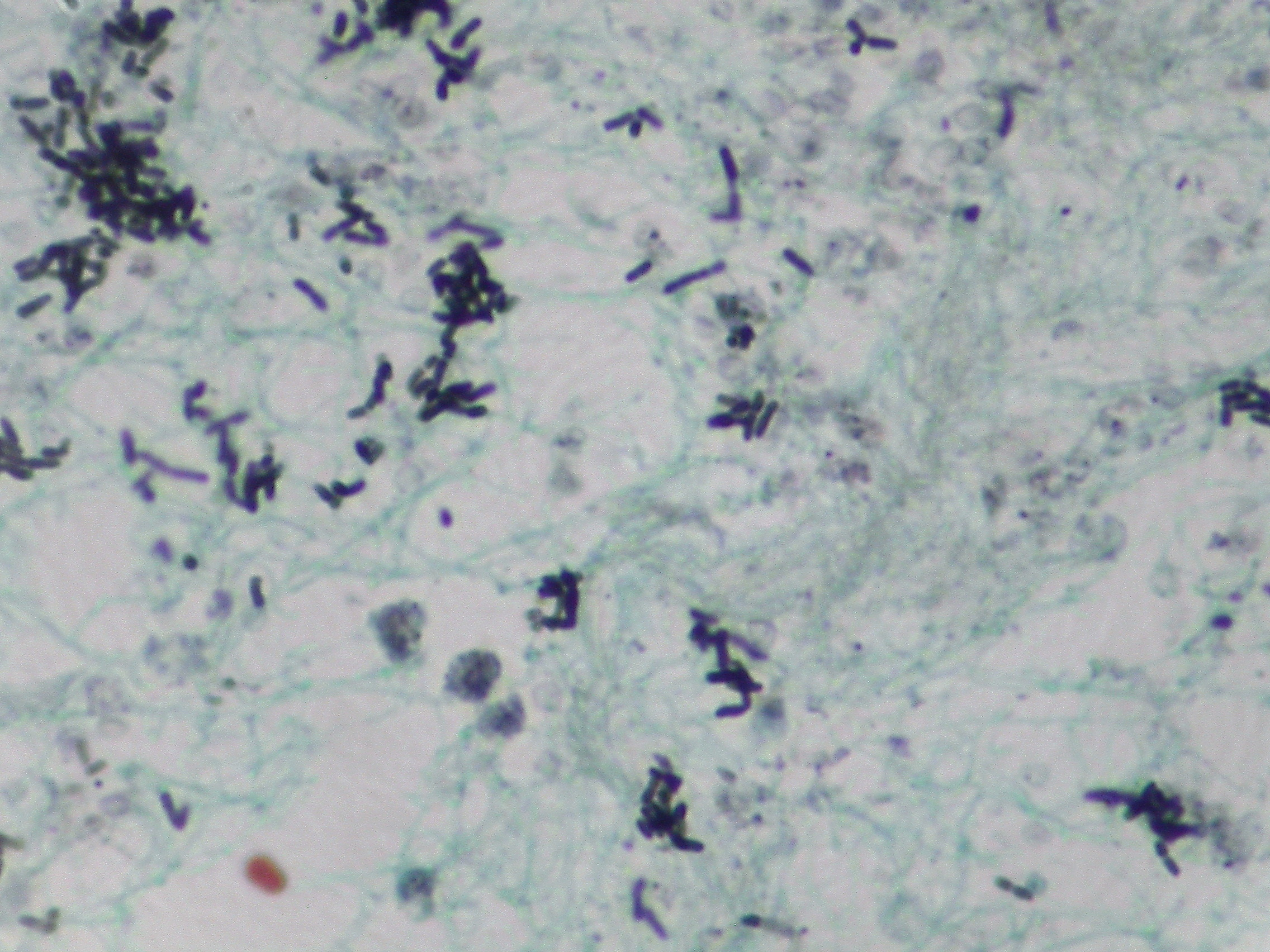
- Geotrichum candidum

Scientific classification
- Kingdom: Fungi
- Division: Ascomycota
- Class: Dipodascomycetes
- Order: Dipodascales
- Family: Dipodascaceae; Engl. & E.Gilg (1924)

Type genus
- Dipodascus Lagerh. (1892)

Genera
- Dipodascus; Galactomyces; Geotrichum; Magnusiomyces Zender; Protendomycopsis; Saprochaete; Sporopachydermia; Yarrowia

= Dipodascaceae =

Family of fungi

The Dipodascaceae are a family of yeasts in the order Saccharomycetales. According to the 2007 Outline of Ascomycota, the family contains four genera; however, the placement of Sporopachydermia and Yarrowia is uncertain. GBIF accepted all the species and also added Magnusiomyces and Protendomycopsis to the family. Species in the family have a widespread distribution, and are found in decaying plant tissue, or as spoilage organisms in the food industry.
