= Trichosporonales =

Scientific classification
- Kingdom: Fungi
- Division: Basidiomycota
- Class: Tremellomycetes
- Order: Trichosporonales; Boekhout & Fell (2001)

Families
- Tetragoniomycetaceae; Trichosporonaceae

Order of fungi

The Trichosporonales are an order in the fungal class Tremellomycetes. The order contains two families and ten genera. Several species in the Trichosporonaceae are human pathogens.
