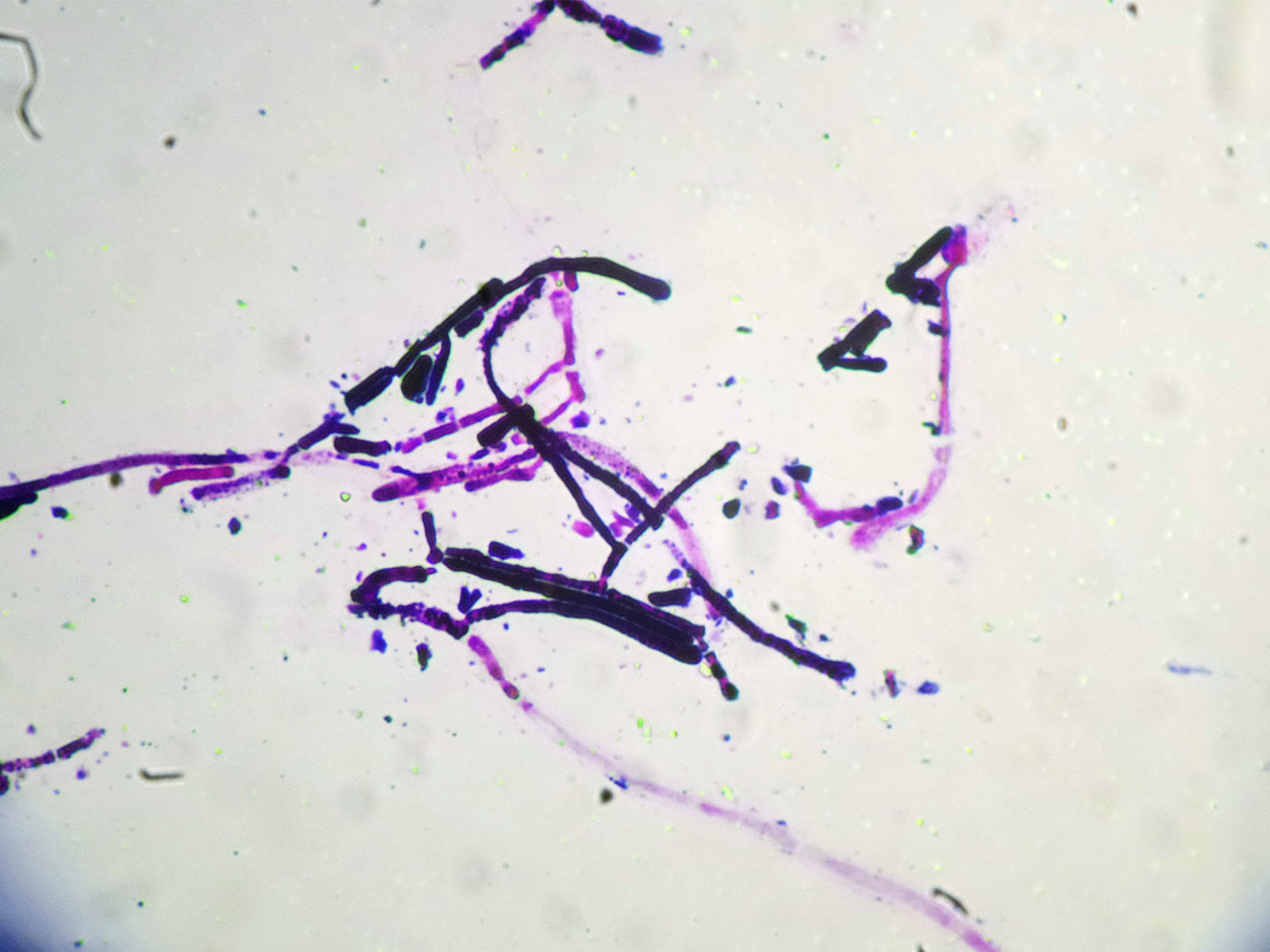
- Geotrichum candidum

Scientific classification
- Kingdom: Fungi
- Division: Ascomycota
- Subdivision: Saccharomycotina
- Class: Dipodascomycetes; M. Groenew., Hittinger, Opulente & A. Rokas
- Order: Dipodascales; M. Groenew., Hittinger, Opulente & A. Rokas

Families
- Dipodascaceae; Trichomonascaceae

= Dipodascales =

Dipodascales is an order of dimorphic yeasts that can also produce arthroconidia. It is the only order within the class Dipodascomycetes and contains the two families Dipodascaceae and Trichomonascaceae.
