= Ogataea polymorpha =

Scientific classification
- Kingdom: Fungi
- Division: Ascomycota
- Class: Saccharomycetes
- Order: Saccharomycetales
- Family: Pichiaceae
- Genus: Ogataea
- Species: O. polymorpha

Binomial name
- Ogataea polymorpha (Morais & M.H.Maia) Y.Yamada, K.Maeda & Mikata

Synonyms
- Candida thermophila K.S.Shin, Y.K.Shin, J.H.Yoon & Y.H.Park; Hansenula angusta Wick.; Hansenula polymorpha Morais & M.H.Maia; Ogataea thermophila G. Péter, Tornai-Leh., K.S.Shin & Dlauchy; Torulopsis methanothermo Urakami; Pichia angusta

Species of fungus

Ogataea polymorpha and Ogataea parapolymorpha are two methylotrophic yeasts used as a protein factory for pharmaceuticals.

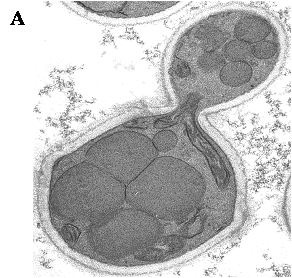
Fig. 1. (A) Micrograph of a budding O. polymorpha cell, grown in a chemostat under methanol conditions. The cytosol is crowded by peroxisomes (after Gellissen et al. 2005).

(B) Methanol metabolism pathway in O. polymorpha (modified after Gellissen et al. 2005). 1 - alcohol oxidase, 2 – catalase, 3 – dihydroxyacetone synthase, 4 – formaldehyde dehydrogenase, 5 – formate dehydrogenase, 6 – dihydroxyacetone kinase, 7 – GSH – glutathione, Xu5P – xylulose-5-phosphate, FBP – fructose-1,6-bisphosphate.

Ogataea polymorpha belongs to a limited number of methylotrophic yeast species – yeasts that can grow on methanol. The range of methylotrophic yeasts includes Candida boidinii, Pichia methanolica, Pichia pastoris and Ogataea polymorpha. O. polymorpha is taxonomically a species of the family Saccharomycetaceae.

== Strains ==
Three "H. polymorpha" strains, identified in the 1950s, are known. They have unclear relationships and are of independent origins. They exhibit different features and are used in basic research and to recombinant protein production:

- strain CBS4732 (CCY38-22-2; ATCC 34438, NRRL-Y-5445) - isolated from wastewater-irrigated soil in Pernambuco, Brazil
- strain DL-1 (NRRL-Y-7560; ATCC 26012) - isolated from soil in Massachusetts, USA
- strain NCYC495 (CBS1976; ATCC 14754, NRLL-Y-1798) - isolated from spoiled concentrated orange juice in Florida, USA

Strains CBS4732 and NCYC495 can be mated whereas strain DL-1 cannot be mated with the other two. Strains CBS4732 and DL-1 are employed for recombinant protein production, strain NCYC495 is mainly used for the study of nitrate assimilation.

The entire genome of all three above strains have been completely sequenced. DL-1 is now considered a separate species, Ogataea parapolymorpha, with about 10% genomic divergence from the others. The genome was however fully collinear.

NCYC495 expresses mating-type a and the other two express mating-type α. Mating-type switching is done via chromosomal inversion.

Ogataea polymorpha is a thermo-tolerant microorganism with some strains growing at temperatures above 50 °C (122 °F). The organism is able to assimilate nitrate and can grow on a range of carbon sources in addition to methanol. Cells grown under conditions of elevated temperature accumulate a sugar named trehalose (this sugar is usually found in insects) as thermo-protective compound. It was shown that trehalose synthesis is not required for growth under these conditions, but for acquisition of thermotolerance. The synthetic steps for trehalose synthesis have been detailed for O. polymorpha, and TPS1, the key enzyme gene of this pathway, has been isolated and characterized.

All methylotrophic yeasts share an identical methanol utilization pathway (Fig. 1). Growth on methanol is accompanied by a massive proliferation of cell organelles named peroxisomes in which the initial enzymatic steps of this pathway take place. O. polymorpha is model organism to study all aspects of peroxisomal functions and the underlying molecular biology. During growth on methanol key enzymes of the methanol metabolism are present in high amounts. An especially high abundance can be observed for enzymes called MOX (methanol oxidase), FMDH (formate dehydrogenase), and DHAS (dihydroxyacetone synthase). Their presence is regulated at the transcriptional level of the respective genes. In the related species C. boidinii, P. methanolica, and P. pastoris this gene expression strictly depends on the presence of methanol or methanol derivatives, whereas in O. polymorpha strong expression is elicited by appropriate levels of glycerol or under conditions of glucose starvation. O. polymorpha produces glycoproteins with two types of sugar chains, N- and O-linked glycans are attached to protein. Studies on the structure of N-linked chains have revealed a certain average length (Man8-12GlcNAc2) with terminal alpha-1,2-linked mannose residues, and not with allergenic terminal alpha-1,3-linked mannose residues as found in other yeasts, especially in the baker’s yeast Saccharomyces cerevisiae.

== Biotechnological applications ==
Ogataea (para)polymorpha with its unusual characteristics provides an excellent platform for the gene technological production of proteins, especially of pharmaceuticals like insulin for treatment of diabetes, hepatitis B vaccines or IFNalpha-2a for the treatment of hepatitis C. Derivatives of both CBS4732 and DL-1 are employed in the production of such recombinant compounds. Further yeasts employed for this application are Pichia pastoris, Arxula adeninivorans and Saccharomyces cerevisiae and others.

Like other yeasts, O. (para)polymorpha is a microorganism that can be cultured in large fermenters to high cell densities within a short time. It is a safe organism in not containing pyrogens, pathogens or viral inclusions. It can release compounds into a culture medium as it has all the components required for secretion (this is for instance not the case with bacteria like Escherichia coli). It can provide attractive genetic components for an efficient production of proteins.

In Fig. 2 the general design of a vector (a genetic vehicle to transform a yeast strain into a genetically engineered protein producer). It must contain several genetic elements:

1. A selection marker, required to select a transformed strain from an untransformed background –this can be done if for instance such an element enables a deficient strain to grow under culturing conditions void of a certain compound like a particular amino acid that cannot be produced by the deficient strain).
2. Certain elements to propagate and to target the foreign DNA to the chromosome of the yeast (ARS and/or rDNA sequence).
3. A segment responsible for the production of the desired protein compound a so-called expression cassette. Such a cassette is made up by a sequence of regulatory elements, a promoter that controls, how much and under which circumstances a following gene sequence is transcribed and as a consequence how much protein is eventually made. This means that the segment following the promoter is variable depending on the desired product – it could be a sequence determining the amino acids for insulin, for hepatitis B vaccine or for interferon. The expression cassette is terminated by a following terminator sequence that provides a proper stop of the transcription. The promoter elements of the O. polymorpha system are derived from genes that are highly expressed, from instance from the MOX gene, the FMD gene or the TPS1 gene mentioned before. They are not only very strong, but can also be regulated by certain addition of carbon sources like sugar, methanol or glycerol.

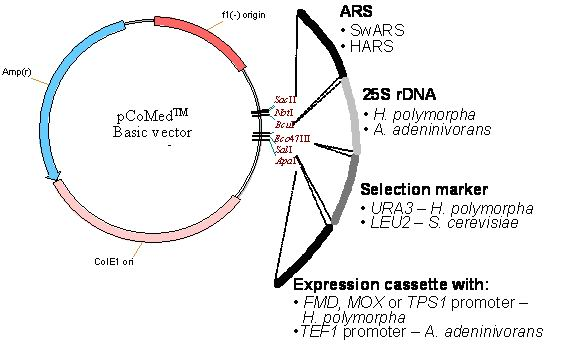
Fig. 2. Design and functionality of CoMed vector system. The CoMed basic vector contains all E. coli elements for propagation in the E. coli system and a MCS for integration of ARS, rDNA, selection marker and expression cassette modules. For this purpose, ARS fragments are flanked by SacII and BcuI restriction sites, rDNA regions by BcuI and Eco47III restriction sites, selection markers by Eco47III and SalI restriction sites and promoter elements by SalI and ApaI restriction sites.

In 2000 an informal society of scientists was founded named HPWN (Hansenula polymorpha worldwide network) founded by Marten Veenhuis, Groningen, and Gerd Gellissen, Düsseldorf. Every two years meetings are held.

The attractiveness of the O. (para)polymorpha platform is commercially exploited by several biotech companies for the development of production processes, among others by PharmedArtis, located in Aachen, Germany and the Leibniz-Institut für Pflanzengenetik und Kulturpflanzenforschung (IPK).
