= Blastobotrys elegans =

Scientific classification
- Kingdom: Fungi
- Division: Ascomycota
- Class: Dipodascomycetes
- Order: Dipodascales
- Family: Trichomonascaceae
- Genus: Blastobotrys
- Species: B. elegans

Binomial name
- Blastobotrys elegans de Hoog, Rantio-Lehtimäki & Smith; Antonie van Leeuwenhoek 51 (1): 95 (1985)

Species of fungus

Blastobotrys elegans is a species of fungus.

== History and taxonomy ==
The genus Blastobotrys was incorrectly identified as a hyphomycete and classified within "Deuteromyces" (Fungi imperfecti) by Klopotek in 1967, with Blastobotrys nivea as the type species. Based on the unique manner, that Blastobotrys displayed dual orders of conidia, von Klopotek concluded, that it must differ from other conidia producing genera like Tritirachium and Rhinocladellia.

Then in 1985, the morphological and physiological characteristics of Blastobotrys were defined and distinguished from other closely related species Sporothrix and Trichosporiella, by de Hoog, Rantio-Lehtimäki and Smith. As a result, the genus Sporothrix was reserved for anamorphs of Ophiostomatales; and the genus Blastobotrys, for other saccharomycetous yeasts. They had also discovered several new species of fungi, including Blastobotrys elegans and Trichomonascus teleomorphs that related to anamorphs of Blastobotrys.

In 1995, after performing D1/D2 analysis, Kurtzman and Robnett reclassified Blastobotrys in the Saccharomycetales order, within the Trichomonascaceae family. They had suspected a strong relation between Blastobotrys species and other anamorphs like Arxula, Candida species and Sympodiomyces. This theory was finally confirmed correct in 2014, by Daniel, Lachance and Kurtzman, through their multilocus sequence analysis on related species of anamorphic genera. All species of Arxula and Sympodiomyces and several species of Candida were found to be members of the Trichomonascus clade and were subsequently transferred to the Blastobotrys genus.

Kurtzman and Robnett proposed, that since Blastobotrys has taxonomic priority, all anamorphic species of Trichomonascaceae should be assigned to this genus. Similarly, Trichomonascus, the telemorphic state of Blastobotrys, represents the ascosporic genus Trichomonascaceae and takes taxonomic priority over Stephanoascus. Therefore, all teleomorphs of Trichomonascaceae should be assigned to Trichomonascus.

== Habitat ==
Blastobotrys elegans was first isolated by mycologists de Hoog, Rantio-Lehtimäki and Smith in 1985, Finland, from indoor air.

== Description ==
=== Physiology ===
Blastobotrys elegans exhibits yeast like growth consisting of very dense, outwardly growing hyphae. It is a feminine, anamorphic ascomycete that reproduces asexually, through conidia. It has no known recorded teleomorphic state. Like many Blastobotrys species, B. elegans is characterized by bearing globular primary conidia which synchronously produce distinct, secondary globular conidia. The conidia develop on specialized hyphae called conidiophores, which grow upwards and obliquely. For the most part, budding cells are absent in B. elegans.

=== Morphology ===
A strain of B. elegans, labelled CBS 530.83A, was grown at 20-22°C on 4% malt extract/0.5% yeast extract agar and the following traits were observed from its growth. During the early growth phase (after 10 days), several dull white colonies, measuring around 3-5 mm in diameter can be observed. In the later stages of growth, bigger farinose patches begin to appear. They then grow into large, elevated, cerebriform patches. Even as B. elegans growth progresses, it does not emit any noticeable odors. Normally, the species does not usually produce budding cells, however they can form on scattered giant cells.

Hyphae are translucent, about 2-3 μm wide, grow outwards unevenly and septate every 20-40 μm. As cylindrical denticles continue to develop, conidia will form at their apical ends. B. elegans produces primary conidia and secondary conidia, that typically develop simultaneously. Primary conidia are spherical, measure 2.8-4.2 μm in diameter and lack setae. Primary conidia are also densely packed with spherical secondary conidia that measure 1.8-3.4 μm in diameter and also lack setae.

== Growth tests ==
All Blastobotrys species, including B. elegans, can grow on cellobiose, D-galactose, D-glucitol, D-glucose, D-mannitol, D-xylose, erythritol, glycerol, ribitol and trehalose. Therefore, when only looking at growth tests, it is very challenging to differentiate B. elegans from other Blastobotrys species.

It is worth mentioning, that B. elegans also grows on adenine, arbutin, D-ribose, ethanol, ethylamine, glycine, isobutanol, lactose, n-Hexadecane, maltose, succinate and uric acid. It is unable to grow on D-arabinose, inositol, isoleucine, L-rhamnose, lactate, leucine, melezitose, melibiose, methyl-α-D-glucopyranoside, putrescine, raffinose and sucrose. Other, conditions resulting in negative growth include: on nitrate, at 37°C, without vitamins and in diazonium blue B.

=== Anaerobic metabolism ===
Sugars are normally fermented by all Blastobotrys species. Interestingly, B. elegans is the only Blastobotrys species discovered, without the ability to ferment sugar in anaerobic conditions. Subsequently, with the absence of respiration, there is no observed B. elegans growth on D-galactose, D-glucose, D-xylose, lactose, maltose, raffinose, starch and trehalose. It is also unable to ferment insulin.

== Comparative genomic studies ==
DNA sequencing and BLAST searching were conducted to phylogenetically characterize endosymbiotic yeasts isolated from the guts of basidiocarp-feeding beetles. While it was disclosed, that none of the isolated fungal strains had DNA sequences identical to ones in GenBank; a yeast taxon related to (92% similarity) B. elegans, occurred in 6/22 cloned sequences from the beetle family, Neomida. Further, a yeast taxon related to (91% similarity) Trichomonascus farinosus (originally named Stephanoascus farinosus), occurred in 1/22 clones. In other words, 30% of the clones from Neomida, were discovered to be similar to species of Trichomonascus (teleomorph) and its anamorphic genus Blastobotrys.

Two more novel strains of Blastobotrys, very closely related to B. elegans were isolated, and both strains were also found to grow closely with insects. Blastobotrys meliponae is found in the honey of the bee, Melipona scutellaris and Blastobotrys bombycis is found in the gut of the silkworm larva, Bombyx mori.

Another comparative DNA sequencing study, found significant nucleotide similarity (<81.7%) between six strains of Trichomonascus ciferrii isolates (obtained from human ear swabs) and other Trichomonascus/Blastobotrys species.

== Pathogenicity and toxicity ==
While B. elegans appears to be closely related to many pathogenic fungi, it has not been recorded to cause disease or damage in a host.
