= Komagataella ulmi =

Scientific classification
- Kingdom: Fungi
- Division: Ascomycota
- Class: Saccharomycetes
- Order: Saccharomycetales
- Family: Pichiaceae
- Genus: Komagataella
- Species: K. ulmi

Binomial name
- Komagataella ulmi Kurtzman, 2012

Species of fungus

Komagataella ulmi is a ascomycetous species of fungi that occurs as a yeast.

== Discovery ==
Komagataella ulmi was first described as a unique species in 2012 from a sample collected in 1945 from an American elm (Ulmus americana) in Peoria, Illinois. It was differentiated from previously discovered species via DNA sequencing. It was discovered alongside its close relative, Komagataella populi, bringing the number of known species at the time within Komagataella from three to five.

== Growth and morphology ==
Komagataella ulmi, when grown on YM agar, has been described as "spherical... to short ellipsoidal", with widths ranging from 2-7 μm. Cells occur alone or in pairs. Within asci, growth of 1-4 hat-shaped ascospores has been reported. K. ulmi has the ability to ferment glucose and trehalose; other common sugars are not fermented. It is capable of weak growth at 37°C.

== Ecology and distribution ==
K. ulmi has been discovered in Illinois, Missouri, and California. In addition to the American elm, it has been isolated from tree species such as cork oak (Quercus suber), valley oak (Quercus lobata), and sugar maple (Acer saccharum).

== Phylogeny ==
Within Komagataella, K. ulmi is most closely related to Komagataella pastoris.
