= Komagataella kurtzmanii =

Scientific classification
- Kingdom: Fungi
- Division: Ascomycota
- Class: Pichiomycetes
- Order: Pichiales
- Family: Pichiaceae
- Genus: Komagataella
- Species: K. kurtzmanii

Binomial name
- Komagataella kurtzmanii G.I. Naumov, E.S. Naumova, Tyurin & Kozlov

Species of fungus

Komagataella kurtzmanii is a species of ascomycete fungi existing as a yeast.

== Discovery ==
Komagataella kurtzmanii was first described from a strain that had been previously collected from a fir tree (Abies sp.) in the Catalina mountains, in Arizona. It was determined to be a distinct species on the basis of comparisons of DNA sequences. K. kurtzmanii is named after Cletus P. Kurtzman, for his contributions to the study of yeast taxonomy.

== Growth and morphology ==
When grown on malt extract agar, cells of K. kurtzmanii have been described as "spherical... to oviod" with lengths ranging from 2-7 μm. Within asci, growth of 1-4 hat-shaped ascospores has been reported. Growth does not occur at temperatures of 35°C or above. Glucose is fermented by K. kurtzmanii; other common carbohydrates are not fermented. K. kurtzmanii is unique among Komagataella as the only member unable to assimilate trehalose.

== Phylogeny ==
Within Komagataella, K. kurtzmanii is most closely related to K. phaffii.
