= Alcohol oxidase =

Class of enzymes

alcohol oxidase
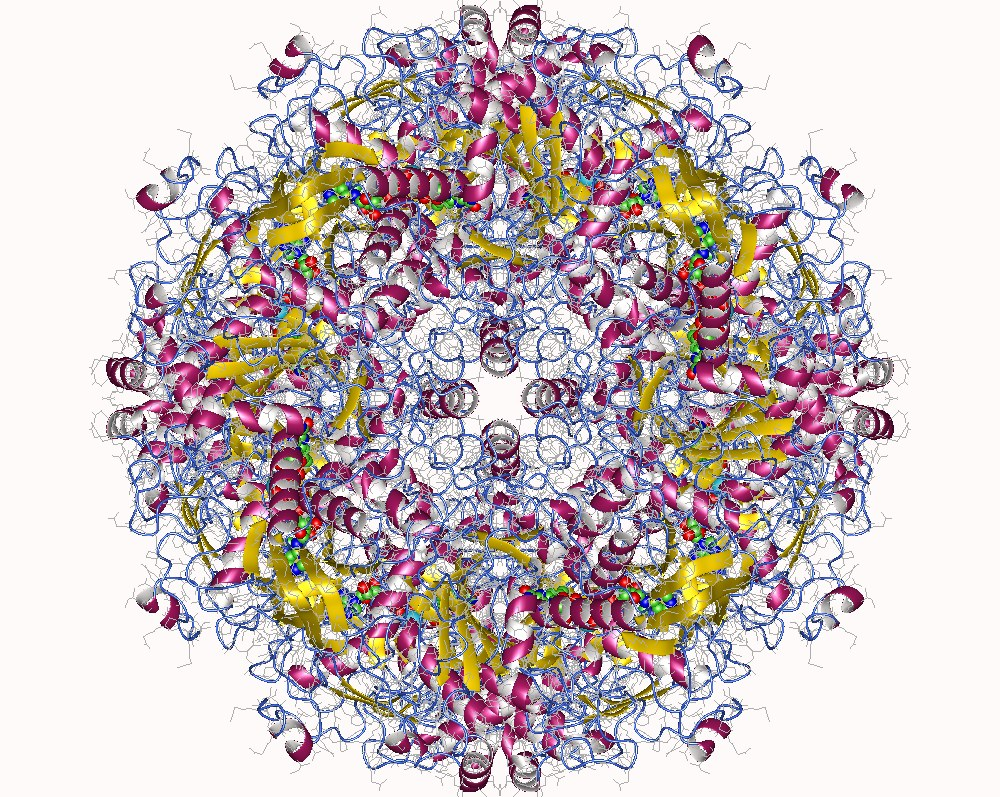
- Alcohol oxidase homooctamer, Komagataella pastoris

Identifiers
- EC no.: 1.1.3.13
- CAS no.: 9073-63-6

Databases
- BRENDA: enzyme data
- ExPASy: NiceZyme view
- KEGG: enzyme entry
- MetaCyc: metabolic pathway
- Rhea: reactions
- PDB structures: RCSB PDB PDBe PDBsum
- Gene Ontology: AmiGO / QuickGO
Search
- PMC: articles
- PubMed: articles
- NCBI: proteins

In enzymology, an alcohol oxidase (EC 1.1.3.13) is an enzyme that catalyzes the chemical reaction

a primary alcohol + O_{2} $\rightleftharpoons$ an aldehyde + H_{2}O_{2}

Thus, the two substrates of this enzyme are primary alcohol and O_{2}, whereas its two products are aldehyde and H_{2}O_{2}.

This enzyme belongs to the family of oxidoreductases, specifically those acting on the CH-OH group of the donor with oxygen as the acceptor. It employs one cofactor, FAD.

== Name ==
The systematic name of this enzyme class is alcohol:oxygen oxidoreductase. This enzyme is also called methanol oxidase and ethanol oxidase. Sometimes, this enzyme is called short-chain alcohol oxidase (SCAO) to differentiate it from long-chain-alcohol oxidase (LCAO), aryl-alcohol oxidase (AAO) and secondary-alcohol oxidase (SAO).

== Reaction ==
Alcohol oxidases catalyzes the oxidation of primary alcohols to their corresponding aldehydes. Unlike alcohol dehydrogenases, they are unable to catalyze the reverse reaction. This is reflected in their cofactor as well—unlike alcohol dehydrogenases, which use NAD^{+}, alcohol oxidases use FAD. SCAO is capable of oxidizing alcohols with up to 8 carbons, but their primary substrates are methanol and ethanol.

The reaction catalyzed by alcohol oxidase.

Known inhibitors of this enzyme include H_{2}O_{2}, Cu^{2+}, phenanthroline, acetamide, potassium cyanide, or cyclopropanone.

== Properties ==
SCAO is an intracellular enzyme. Its common source are fungi and yeasts, but it has also been shown to be present in mollusks.

It appears as an octameric protein, except for SCAO from A. ochraceus, which has been shown to be a tetramer. Each of the subunites is 65-80 kDa. Nine SCAO isoforms have been found in Ogataea methanolica, which has been shown to be a result of different combinations of two different subunits in the octamers, each coded by a different gene.

== Structural studies ==
As of late 2007, 9 structures have been solved for this class of enzymes, with PDB accession codes PDB: 1AHU, PDB: 1AHV, PDB: 1AHZ, PDB: 1VAO, PDB: 1W1J, PDB: 1W1K, PDB: 1W1L, PDB: 1W1M, and PDB: 2VAO.

== Potential use ==
Several potential uses have been suggested for SCAO:

- Biosensors with amperometric detection can be used within beverage testing, fermentation monitoring, methanol and ethanol detection, body fluid screening, and toxicological and phorensic laboratories
- Chemical synthesis of various aldehydes including aroma and flavor chemicals, where it could appear as a cheaper and more eco-friendly alternative to current methods
