= Kuraishia molischiana =

Scientific classification
- Kingdom: Fungi
- Division: Ascomycota
- Class: Saccharomycetes
- Order: Saccharomycetales
- Family: Pichiaceae
- Genus: Kuraishia
- Species: K. molischiana

Binomial name
- Kuraishia molischiana (Zikes) Péter et al. 2005

Synonyms
- Candida molischiana; Torula molischiana; Torulopsis molischiana; Cryptococcus molischianus; Torulopsis methanophiles

Kuraishia molischiana is a fungus in the genus Kuraishia that exists as a yeast.

== Taxonomy ==
First discovered in 1911, K. molischiana was originally named Torula molischiana. A 1978 review of the genus Torulopsis (a synonym of Torula) moved every species to the genus Candida, renaming the species to Candida molischiana. For some time this species was considered to be the teleomorph of Kuraishia capsulata, until a 2005 study found the two fungi to be different species on the basis of differences in their genomes. It was this study that named the species K. molischiana.

== Growth and metabolism ==
Cells of K. molischiana have been described as "spherical to ellipsoidal" in shape. Cells tend to occur singly or in small clusters. It has the ability to ferment glucose, although it lacks the ability to ferment other common carbohydrates such as galactose and sucrose.

== Ecology ==
Kuraishia molischiana was first discovered in used tanning bark. It has been found in insect frass found on trees, often in pine trees. It has been suggested that larvae of wood-boring insects are a primary habitat for Kuraishia species.

It has been found across North America and Eurasia, including countries such as Sweden, Japan, Canada, Hungary, and the United States.

== Biotechnology applications ==
A Beta-glucosidase originating in K. molischiana, when added to Muscat wine, has been found to improve aromatic qualities.

Kuraishia molischiana has also been shown to metabolize cellodextrins, which may be a desirable trait in the production of biofuels.
