= O. polymorpha =

O. polymorpha may refer to:

- Ogataea polymorpha, a methylotrophic yeast
- Olethreutes polymorpha, a tortrix moth
