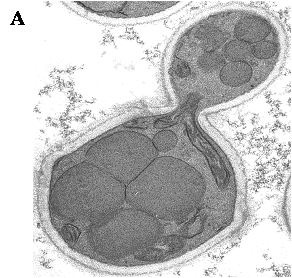
- Micrograph of a budding O. polymorpha cell

Scientific classification
- Kingdom: Fungi
- Division: Ascomycota
- Class: Pichiomycetes
- Order: Pichiales
- Family: Pichiaceae
- Genus: Ogataea; Yamada, Maeda & Mikita, 1994

Species
- Ogataea allantospora; Ogataea chonburiensis; Ogataea corticis; Ogataea dorogensis; Ogataea falcaomoraisii; Ogataea ganodermae; Ogataea glucozyma; Ogataea henricii; Ogataea kodamae; Ogataea methanolica; Ogataea methylivora; Ogataea minuta; Ogataea naganishii; Ogataea nakhonphanomensis; Ogataea neopini; Ogataea nitratoaversa; Ogataea nonfermentans; Ogataea paradorogensis; Ogataea philodendri; Ogataea pilisensis; Ogataea pini; Ogataea polymorpha; Ogataea populialbae; Ogataea ramenticola; Ogataea salicorniae; Ogataea siamensis; Ogataea thermomethanolica; Ogataea trehaloabstinens; Ogataea trehalophila; Ogataea wickerhamii; Ogataea zsoltii

= Ogataea =

Genus of fungi

Ogataea is a genus of ascomycetous yeasts in the family Saccharomycetaceae. It was separated from the former genus Hansenula via an examination of their 18S and 26S rRNA partial base sequencings by Yamada et al. 1994.

The genus name of Ogataea is in honour of Koichi Ogata (x - 1977), who was a Japanese microbiologist from the Department of Agricultural Chemistry, Faculty of Agriculture, at Kyoto University. It was stated in the journal; "The genus is named in honor of the late Professor Dr. Koichi Ogata, Department of Agricultural Chemistry, Faculty of Agriculture, Kyoto University, Kyoto, Japan, in recognition of his studies on the oxidation and assimilation of methanol (C1 compound) in methanol-utilizing yeasts."

The genus was circumscribed by Yuzo Yamada, Kojiro Maeda and Kozaburo Mikata in Biosc., Biotechn. Biochem. vol.58 (Issue 7) on page 1253 in 1994.

== Diagnosis ==
Like other yeasts, also the species within the genus Ogataea are single-celled or build pseudohyphae of only a few elongated cells; true hyphae are not formed.

They are able to reproduce sexually or asexually. The latter case happens with a cell division by multilateral budding on a narrow base with spherical to ellipsoidal budded cells. In the sexual reproduction the asci are deliquescent and may be unconjugated or show conjugation between a cell and its bud or between independent cells. Asci produce one to four, sometimes more, ascospores which are hat-shaped, allantoid or spherical with a ledge. The species are homothallic or infrequently heterothallic.

Ogataea cells are able to ferment glucose or other sugars and some species assimilate nitrate. All known species are able to utilize methanol as carbon source. The predominant ubiquinone is coenzyme Q-7 and the diazonium blue B test is negative. Some species are used and cultured for microbiological and genetic research e.g. Ogataea polymorpha, Ogataea minuta or Ogataea methanolica. Ogataea minuta (Wickerham) Y. Yamada, K. Maeda & Mikata is the type species for this genus.

== Species ==
Ogataea consists of several species and is placed within the Saccharomycetales as a sister genus to Ambrosiozyma. Following Kurtzman et al. 2011 the genus consists of 31 species but also shows, that there are several more within the taxon that are part of the polyphyletic genus Candida.

- Ogataea allantospora Péter, Tornai-Lehoczki & Dlauchy (2007)
- Ogataea chonburiensis Limtong, Srisuk, Yongmanitchai, Yurimoto & Nakase (2008)
- Ogataea corticis Nagatsuka, S. Saito & Sugiyama (2008)
- Ogataea dorogensis (Péter, Tornai-Lehoczki, Fülöp & Dlauchy) Nagatsuka, S. Saito & Sugiyama (2008)
- Ogataea falcaomoraisii Morais, Teixeira, J.M. Bowles, Lachance & C.A. Rosa (2004)
- Ogataea ganodermae F.Y Bai & Z.H. Ji (2008)
- Ogataea glucozyma (Wickerham) Y. Yamada, K. Maeda & Mikata (1994)
- Ogataea henricii (Wickerham) Y. Yamada, K. Maeda & Mikata (1994)
- Ogataea kodamae (van der Walt & Yarrow) Mikata & Y. Yamada (1995)
- Ogataea methanolica (Makiguchi) Kurtzman & Robnett (2010)
- Ogataea methylivora (Kumamoto & Seriu) Kurtzman & Robnett (2010)
- Ogataea minuta (Wickerham) Y. Yamada, K. Maeda & Mikata (1994)
- Ogataea naganishii (K. Kodama) Kurtzman & Robnett (2010)
- Ogataea nakhonphanomensis Limtong, Srisuk, Yongmanitchai, Yurimoto & Nakase (2008)
- Ogataea neopini Nagatsuka, S. Saito & Sugiyama (2008)
- Ogataea nitratoaversa Péter, Tornai-Lehoczki & Dlauchy (2008)
- Ogataea nonfermentans (Wickerham) Kurtzman & Robnett (2010)
- Ogataea paradorogensis Nakase, Ninomiya, Kawasaki & Limtong (2008)
- Ogataea philodendri (van der Walt & Scott) Y. Yamada, K. Maeda & Mikata (1994)
- Ogataea pilisensis (Péter, Tornai-Lehoczki, Fülöp & Dlauchy) Kurtzman & Robnett (2010)
- Ogataea pini (Holst) Y. Yamada, M. Matsuda, K. Maeda & Mikata (1995)
- Ogataea polymorpha (Falcão de Morais & Dália Maia) Y. Yamada, K. Maeda & Mikata (1994)
- Ogataea populialbae Péter, Tornai-Lehoczki & Dlauchy (2009)
- Ogataea ramenticola (Kurtzman) Kurtzman & Robnett (2010)
- Ogataea salicorniae (Hinzelin, Kurtzman & M.Th. Smith) Kurtzman & Robnett (2010)
- Ogataea siamensis (Limtong, Srisuk, Yongmanitchai, H. Kawasaki, Yurimoto, Nakase & N. Kato) Limtong, Srisuk, Yongmanitchai, Yurimoto & Nakase (2008)
- Ogataea thermomethanolica (Limtong, Srisuk, Yongmanitchai, Yurimoto, Nakase & N. Kato) Limtong, Srisuk, Yongmanitchai, Yurimoto & Nakase (2008)
- Ogataea trehaloabstinens (Péter, Tornai-Lehoczki, Fülöp & Dlauchy) Nagatsuka, S. Saito & Sugiyama (2008)
- Ogataea trehalophila (Phaff, M.W. Miller & Spencer) Kurtzman & Robnett (2010)
- Ogataea wickerhamii (Capriotti) Y. Yamada, M. Matsuda, K. Maeda & Mikata (1995)
- Ogataea zsoltii (Péter, Tornai-Lehoczki, Fülöp & Dlauchy) Nagatsuka, S. Saito & Sugiyama (2008)
