= Mycose =

Mycose can refer to

- Trehalose, a disaccharide also known as mycose, or mushroom sugar
- Mycosis, any disease caused by fungi, called mycose in French
