= Kuraishia =

Scientific classification
- Kingdom: Fungi
- Division: Ascomycota
- Class: Saccharomycetes
- Order: Saccharomycetales
- Family: Pichiaceae
- Genus: Kuraishia; Y.Yamada, K.Maeda & Mikata (1994)

Type species
- Kuraishia capsulata (Wick.) Y.Yamada, K.Maeda & Mikata (1994)

Species
- K. capsulata K. molischiana

Genus of fungi

Kuraishia is a genus of two species of ascomycetous yeasts in the family Pichiaceae. The type species Kuraishia capsulata was originally described as a member of Hansenula (now Pichia) in 1953.

The genus name of Kuraishia is in honour of Hiroshi Kuraishi, Japanese (Micro-)Biologist (Mycology and Lichenology), from the Tokyo University of Agriculture and Technology.

K. molischiana was described as new to science in 2004. The complete genome sequence of K. capsulata was reported in 2013. K. capsulata produces extracellular exopolysahharide, phosphomannan, as an external phosphorus reserve.
