= Komagataella pseudopastoris =

Scientific classification
- Kingdom: Fungi
- Division: Ascomycota
- Class: Pichiomycetes
- Order: Pichiales
- Family: Pichiaceae
- Genus: Komagataella
- Species: K. pseudopastoris

Binomial name
- Komagataella pseudopastoris (Dlauchy, Tornai-Leh., Fülöp & G.Péter, 2003) Kurtzman, 2005

Synonyms
- Pichia pseudopastoris

Species of fungus

Komagataella pseudopastoris is an ascomycete fungi existing as a yeast.

== Discovery ==
Komagataella pseudopastoris was first detected in four samples collected from willow trees (Salix alba) in Budapest and Dorog, Hungary. The collected strains were phenotypically very similar to Komagataella pastoris (which was then classified as Pichia pastoris) but were genetically distinct. The species was originally named Pichia pseudopastoris, with the knowledge that it may be reclassified into the genus Komagataella, which was largely unaccepted at the time. It was officially moved into Komagataella in 2005.

== Growth and morphology ==
Komagataella pseudopastoris cells, when grown on malt extract agar, have been described as "spheroid to ovoid", with lengths ranging from 4-5 μm. Carbon sources used by K. pseudopastoris include xylose, trehalose, and rhamnose. Fermentation of glucose has been observed; no other common sugars are fermented by K. pseudopastoris. Growth occurs at 36°C, but not at 38°C. Cells produce one to four hat-shaped ascospores.

== Phylogeny ==
Within Komagataella, K. pseudopastoris is considered to be most closely related to K. populi and K. mondaviorum.
