= 4-alpha-D-((1-4)-alpha-D-glucano)trehalose trehalohydrolase =

InterPro Family

4-alpha-D-{(1->4)-alpha-D-glucano

Identifiers
- EC no.: 3.2.1.141
- CAS no.: 170780-50-4

Databases
- IntEnz: IntEnz view
- BRENDA: BRENDA entry
- ExPASy: NiceZyme view
- KEGG: KEGG entry
- MetaCyc: metabolic pathway
- PRIAM: profile
- PDB structures: RCSB PDB PDBe PDBsum
Search
- PMC: articles
- PubMed: articles
- NCBI: proteins

4-alpha-D-{(1->4)-alpha-D-glucano}trehalose trehalohydrolase (EC 3.2.1.141, malto-oligosyltrehalose trehalohydrolase) is an enzyme with systematic name 4-alpha-D-((1->4)-alpha-D-glucano)trehalose glucanohydrolase (trehalose-producing). This enzyme catalyses the following chemical reaction

hydrolysis of (1->4)-alpha-D-glucosidic linkage in 4-alpha-D-[(1->4)-alpha-D-glucanosyl]n trehalose to yield trehalose and (1->4)-alpha-D-glucan
