= Komagataella mondaviorum =

Scientific classification
- Kingdom: Fungi
- Division: Ascomycota
- Class: Pichiomycetes
- Order: Pichiales
- Family: Pichiaceae
- Genus: Komagataella
- Species: K. mondaviorum

Binomial name
- Komagataella mondaviorum Naumov, 2018

Species of fungus

Komagataella mondaviorum is a species of ascomycete fungi existing as a yeast.

== Discovery ==
Komagataella mondaviorum was identified as a unique species in 2018 from strains collected throughout the 1950s and 1970s. The strains were previously believed to be Komagataella pastoris. K. mondaviorum was declared a distinct species due to differences in the genome found during DNA sequencing. It was named after Robert and Margrit Mondavi for their contributions to the California wine industry.

== Growth and morphology ==
Komagataella mondaviorum, when grown on malt extract agar, has been described as spherical or ovoid, with lengths ranging between 2-7 μm. Cells are observed to grow singly or in pairs. Colonies are white and smooth. Hat-shaped ascospores have been observed.

Glucose is fermented by K. mondaviorum; fermentation of other common sugars has not been observed. No growth occurs at or above 35°C.

== Phylogeny ==
Within Komagataella, K. mondaviorum is considered to be most closely related to K. populi and K. pseudopastoris.

== Ecology and distribution ==
Komagataella mondaviorum has been isolated from various tree species, including cottonwood (Populus deltoides), black cottonwood (Populus trichocarpa), black oak (Quercus kelloggii), willow (Salix sp.), and hackberry (Celtis sp.). It has been discovered in the United States (California, Washington, and Alaska) as well as Canada (British Columbia).

== Utility in industrial protein synthesis ==
Komagataella mondaviorum has been proposed as a promising candidate for protein synthesis at an industrial scale, with the potential to synthesize products more efficiently than commonly used Komagataella species such as K. phaffii.
