= Trehalase =

Class of enzymes

TREH

Identifiers
- Aliases: TREH, TRE, TREA, trehalase, TREHD
- External IDs: OMIM: 275360; MGI: 1926230; GeneCards: TREH
Enzyme activity
EC #	BRENDA	ExPASy	KEGG	MetaCyc
3.2.1.28	↗	↗	↗	↗

Gene location (Human)
Chr.	Chromosome 11 (human)
Band	11q23.3	Start	118,657,316 bp
Band	11q23.3	End	118,679,690 bp

Gene location (Mouse)
Chr.	Chromosome 9 (mouse)
Band	9|9 A5.2	Start	44,584,530 bp
Band	9|9 A5.2	End	44,597,602 bp
RNA expression pattern
Bgee	Human / Mouse (ortholog); Top expressed in: jejunal mucosa; duodenum; testicle; human kidney; mucosa of ileum; gallbladder; right lobe of liver; sural nerve; stromal cell of endometrium; mucosa of transverse colon / Top expressed in: duodenum; intestinal villus; jejunum; right kidney; human kidney; proximal tubule; ileum; left lobe of liver; axial skeleton; visual cortex; More reference expression data
BioGPS	n/a
Gene ontology
Molecular function	alpha,alpha-trehalase activity; catalytic activity; hydrolase activity; hydrolase activity, acting on glycosyl bonds
Cellular component	anchored component of membrane; anchored component of plasma membrane; plasma membrane; extracellular exosome; membrane
Biological process	animal organ morphogenesis; trehalose catabolic process; metabolism; trehalose metabolic process
Sources:Amigo / QuickGO
Orthologs
Databases	NCBI: entry; OMA: entry
Species	Human	Mouse
Entrez	11181	58866
Ensembl	ENSG00000118094	ENSMUSG00000032098
UniProt	O43280	Q9JLT2
RefSeq (mRNA)	NM_001301065; NM_007180	NM_001277847; NM_001277851; NM_021481
RefSeq (protein)	NP_001287994; NP_009111	NP_001264776; NP_001264780; NP_067456
Location (UCSC)	Chr 11: 118.66 – 118.68 Mb	Chr 9: 44.58 – 44.6 Mb
PubMed search
- Wikidata
View/Edit Human	View/Edit Mouse

Trehalase enzymes are hydrolytic glycosidases, produced by most forms of life, which catalyze the hydrolysis of trehalose (α-D-glucopyranosyl-1,1-α-D-glucopyranoside) - a non-reducing sugar and important storage carbohydrate - into two glucose molecules.

These enzymes are commonly found within brush border cells on the surface of the small intestine, and are present in most animals.

Two different trehalase enzymes have been isolated from Saccharomyces cerevisiae, and are classified according to the optimum working pH; where neutral trehalase (NT) has an optimum pH of 7.0, while that of acid trehalase (AT) is pH 4.5.

Recent studies of trehalase in S.cerevisiae have reported over 90% of AT activity is dedicated to extracellular cleavage of trehalose to glucose within the periplasmic space.

== Function and classification ==
=== Hydrolysis of trehalose ===
One molecule of trehalose is hydrolyzed to two molecules of glucose by the enzyme trehalase. Enzymatic hydrolysis of trehalose was first observed in Aspergillus niger by Bourquelot in 1893. Fischer reported this reaction in S. cerevisiae in 1895. Since then the trehalose hydrolyzing enzyme, trehalase (α, α-trehalose-1-C-glucohydrolase, EC 3.2.1.28) has been reported from many other organisms including plants and animals. In mammals, trehalase enzyme is found to be present in the kidney brush border membrane and the intestinal villi membranes. In the intestine the function of this enzyme is to hydrolyze ingested trehalose. Individuals with a defect in their intestinal trehalase have diarrhea when they eat foods with high trehalose content, such as mushrooms. Trehalose hydrolysis by trehalase enzyme is an important physiological process for various organisms, such as fungal spore germination, insect flight, and the resumption of growth in resting cells.

=== Types of trehalase ===
==== Neutral trehalase (NT) ====
The cytosolic trehalase enzyme, NT, has been purified and characterized extensively from S. cerevisiae. In non-denaturing gels this enzyme protein exhibited a molecular mass of 160 kDa, while in sodium dodecyl sulfate-polyacrylamide gel electrophoresis (SDS-PAGE) it showed a mass of 80 kDa. This hydrolase enzyme is specific for trehalose. The K_{m} of NT has been reported to be 5.7 mM. The gene responsible for trehalase activity in S. cerevisiae is NTH1. This gene is with an open reading frame of 2079 base pairs (bp), encoding a protein of 693 amino acids, corresponding to a molecular mass of 79569 Da.

NT activity is regulated by protein phosphorylation-dephosphorylation. Phosphorylation with cAMP-dependent protein kinase activates NT. Dephosphorylation of the purified phosphorylated enzyme by alkaline phosphatase caused an almost complete inactivation of the enzyme activity; but a recovery of the enzyme activity could be observed by rephosphorylation while incubating with ATP and protein kinase. The activity of NT in crude extracts is enhanced by polycations, while the activity of purified phosphorylated NT is inhibited by them. The activation of crude extracts was found to be due to the removal of polyphosphates, both of which inhibit NT activity.

==== Acid Trehalase (AT) ====
The molecular weight of AT was found to be 218 kDa by gel filtration chromatography. AT is a glycoprotein. It has 86% carbohydrate content. It has been reported that the maturation of AT is a stepwise process beginning with a carbohydrate-free 41 kDa protein; this form is then core-glycosylated in the endoplasmic reticulum to form a 76 kDa glycol-protein. In Golgi bodies, the protein is further glycosylated yielding a 180 kDa form, which ultimately attains a maturity in vacuoles, where its molecular weight becomes around 220 kDa. The 41 kDa carbohydrate free protein moiety of the enzyme was obtained by Endoglycosidase H treatment of purified AT, resulted after sodium dodecyl sulfate gel electrophoresis27. AT exhibited an apparent Km for trehalose of about 4.7 mM at pH 4.5. The gene responsible for AT activity in S. cerevisiae is ATH1.

Ath1p, i.e. AT, has been reported to be necessary for S. cerevisiae to utilize extracellular trehalose as carbon source16. ATH1 deletion mutant of the yeast could not grow in the medium with trehalose as the carbon source.

Researchers have suggested that AT moves from its site of synthesis to the periplasmic space, where it binds exogenous trehalose to internalize it and hydrolyze it in the vacuoles. Recently it has been shown that more than 90% of AT activity in S. cerevisiae is extracellular and the hydrolysis of trehalose into glucose takes place at the periplasmic space. Previously, a highly glycosylated protein, gp37, which is the product of YGP1 gene, was reported to be co-purified with AT activity. Invertase activity was also reported to be co-purified with AT activity. The physical association of AT with these two proteins was thought to suffice for the AT to be secreted by invertase and gp37 secretion pathways in absence of any known secretion signal for Ath1p.

In a Candida utils strain, one regulatory a one non-regulatory trehalase were also reported. These two enzymes were reported to be distinguishable by their molecular weight, behavior in ion-exchange chromatography and kinetic properties. The regulatory trehalase appeared to be a cytoplasmic enzyme and the nonregulatory enzyme was mostly detected in vacuoles. But, in a more recent report, a C. utils strain was demonstrated to lack any detectable AT activity but contain only NT activity. AT activity was not detectable in this strain, though the strain was shown to utilize extracellular trehalose as carbon source.

== Occurrence and biological significance ==
=== Bacteria ===
Trehalose has been reported to be present as a storage carbohydrate in Pseudomonas, Bacillus, Rhizobium and in several actinomycetes and may be partially responsible for their resistance properties. Most of the trehalase enzymes isolated from bacteria have as optimum pH of 6.5–7.5. The trehalase enzyme of Mycobacterium smegmatis is a membrane bound protein. Periplasmic trehalase of Escherichia coli K12 is induced by growth at high osmolarity. The hydrolysis of trehalose into glucose takes place in the periplasm, and the glucose is then transported into the bacterial cell. Another cytoplasmic trehalase has also been reported from E. coli. The gene, which encodes this cytoplasmic trehalase, exhibits high homology to the periplasmic trehalase.

=== Plants ===
In plant kingdom, though trehalose has been reported from several pteridophytes including Selaginella lepidophylla and Botrychium lunaria; the sugar is rare in vascular plants and reported only in ripening fruits of several members of Apiaceae and in the leaves of the desiccation-tolerant angiosperm Myrothamnus flabellifolius. But, the enzyme trehalase is ubiquitous in plants. This is puzzling that trehalase is present in higher plants, though its substrate is absent. No clear role has been demonstrated for trehalase activity in plants. However, trehalose inhibits the synthesis of its precursor, trehalose 6-phosphate, a plant metabolism regulator; hence, its removal may be required. It has been suggested that trehalases could play a role in defense mechanisms or the enzyme could play a role in the degradation of trehalose derived from plant-associated microorganisms.

=== Fungi ===
Two distinct trehalases have been reported from S. cerevisiae. One is regulated by cAMP-dependent phosphorylation and localized to the cytosol. The second trehalase activity is found in the vacuoles. The pH optimum of cytosolic trehalse was determined to be approximately 7.0 and is thus referred to as 'neutral trehalase' (NT); whereas the vacuolar trehalase is most active at pH 4.5 and consequently termed 'acid trehalase' (AT). These enzymes are encoded by two different genes – NTH1 and ATH1 respectively.

Cordyceps militaris uses an insect-like trehalase to break down trehalose, the main blood sugar in its silkworm host. This action causes a sharp decrease in the silkworm's blood sugar levels, which mimics starvation and triggers an increase in feeding behavior. The promotion of excessive feeding and weight gain in the host ultimately benefits the fungus by providing more resources for fruiting body formation.

== See also ==
- Alpha,alpha-trehalase
- Lentztrehalose
- Trehalosamine
