= Komagataella populi =

Scientific classification
- Kingdom: Fungi
- Division: Ascomycota
- Class: Pichiomycetes
- Order: Pichiales
- Family: Pichiaceae
- Genus: Komagataella
- Species: K. populi

Binomial name
- Komagataella populi Kurtzman, 2012

Species of fungus

Komagataella populi is a species of ascomycete fungi existing as a yeast.

== Discovery ==
Komagataella populi was first described in 2012 from a sample taken in 1945 from Peoria, Illinois, from the sap of a cottonwood tree (Populus deltoides).

== Growth and morphology ==
Komagataella populi, when grown on YM agar, is white in color and has been described as spherical to ellipsoidal in shape, with sizes ranging from 2-6 μm. Cells typically appear singly or in pairs. Cell division is performed via multilateral budding. Ascospore formation is infrequent and results in hat-shaped ascospores.

Komagataella populi is capable of fermentation of glucose, as well as weak fermentation of trehalose. It is unable to ferment many other common sugars. It has been shown to use methanol and xylose as carbon sources more efficiently than other species of Komagataella.

== Phylogeny ==
Komagataella populi is believed to be most closely related to Komagataella pseudopastoris and Komagataella mondaviorum.
