= 4-acetamidobutyrate deacetylase =

Class of enzymes

Identifiers
- EC no.: 3.5.1.63
- CAS no.: 102347-82-0

Databases
- BRENDA: enzyme data
- ExPASy: NiceZyme view
- KEGG: enzyme entry
- MetaCyc: metabolic pathway
- Rhea: reactions
- PDB structures: RCSB PDB PDBe PDBsum
- Gene Ontology: AmiGO / QuickGO
Search
- PMC: articles
- PubMed: articles
- NCBI: proteins

4-acetamidobutyrate deacetylase (EC 3.5.1.63) is an enzyme characterised from Candida boidinii that catalyzes the hydrolysis reaction that converts 4-acetamidobutyric acid to GABA ( γ-aminobutyric acid) and acetic acid:

4-acetamidobutyric acid
H_{2}O
GABA
+ CH_{3}COOH

This enzyme is a hydrolase, one acting on carbon-nitrogen bonds other than peptide bonds, specifically in linear amides. The systematic name of this enzyme class is 4-acetamidobutanoate amidohydrolase.
