= Kuraishia capsulata =

Scientific classification
- Kingdom: Fungi
- Division: Ascomycota
- Class: Saccharomycetes
- Order: Saccharomycetales
- Family: Pichiaceae
- Genus: Kuraishia
- Species: K. capsulata

Binomial name
- Kuraishia capsulata (Wickerham) Yamada et al. 1994

Synonyms
- Hansenula capsulata; Pichia capsulata

Kuraishia capsulata is a fungus in the genus Kuraishia that exists as a yeast.

== Taxonomy ==
Upon discovery in 1951, K. capsulata was placed in the genus Hansenula, which was later renamed to Pichia. A 1994 reclassification moved K. capsulata from Pichia and into Kuraishia, making it the first member of the new genus.

== Growth and metabolism ==
Cells of K. capsulata have been described as "spherical to ellipsoidal" in shape. Cells produce 1-2 hat-shaped ascospores. No hyphae growth has been observed. Glucose is fermented by K. capsulata, although the species lacks the ability to ferment other carbohydrates, such as lactose and sucrose.

== Ecology ==
Kuraishia capsulata was first isolated from insect frass in multiple tree species and locations, including from jack pine and spruce trees near Wabatongushi Lake, Ontario, as well as from short leaf and loblolly pines in Piney Woods, Mississippi and from ponderosa pines in Santa Barbara County, California. It has also been found in the frass of the weevil Ips typographus in Moscow Oblast, Russia.

Kuraishia capsulata has also been isolated from olive oil produced in the Molise region of Italy.
