= Trehalosamine =

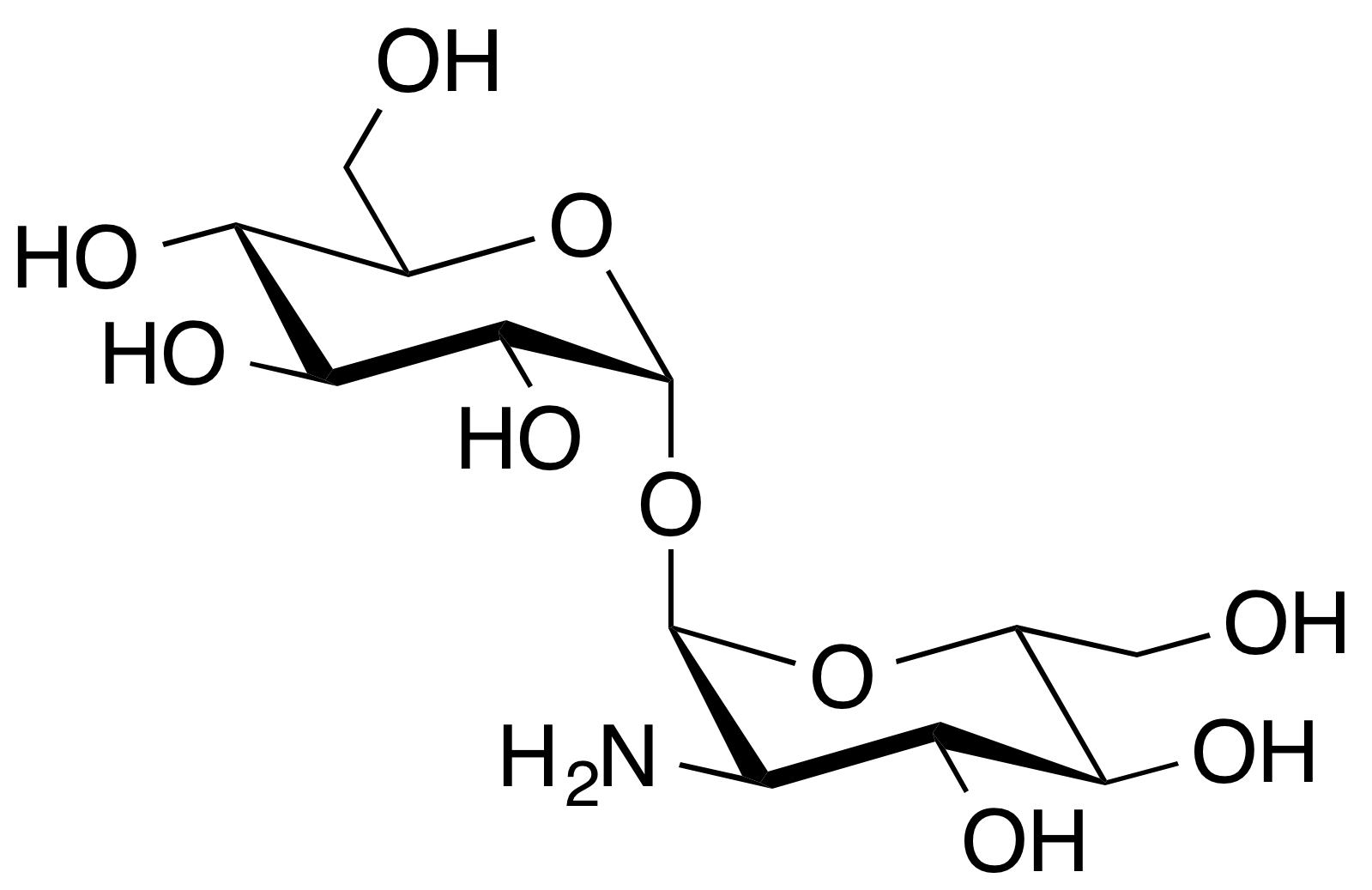
2-Trehalosamine
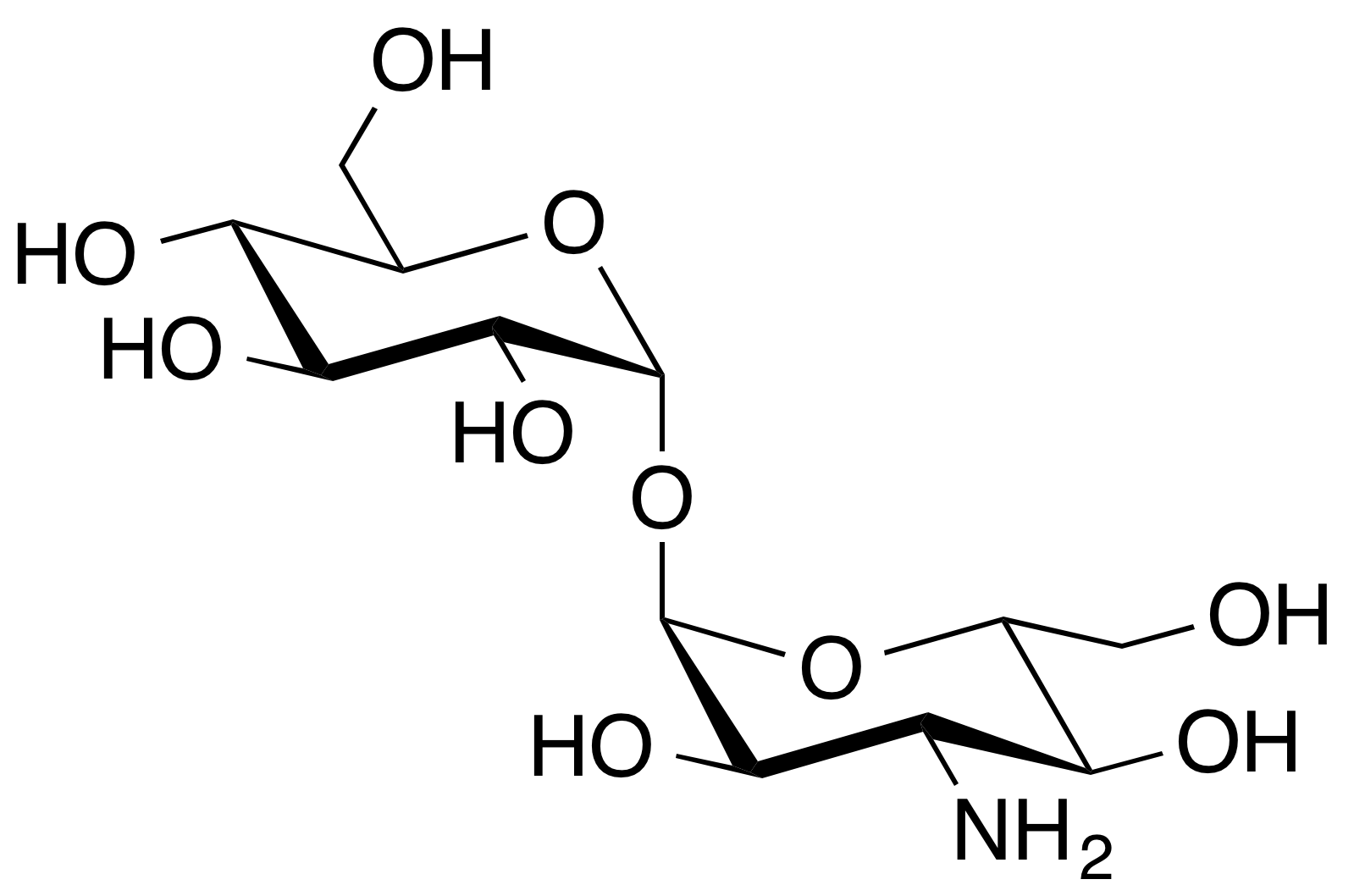
3-Trehalosamine
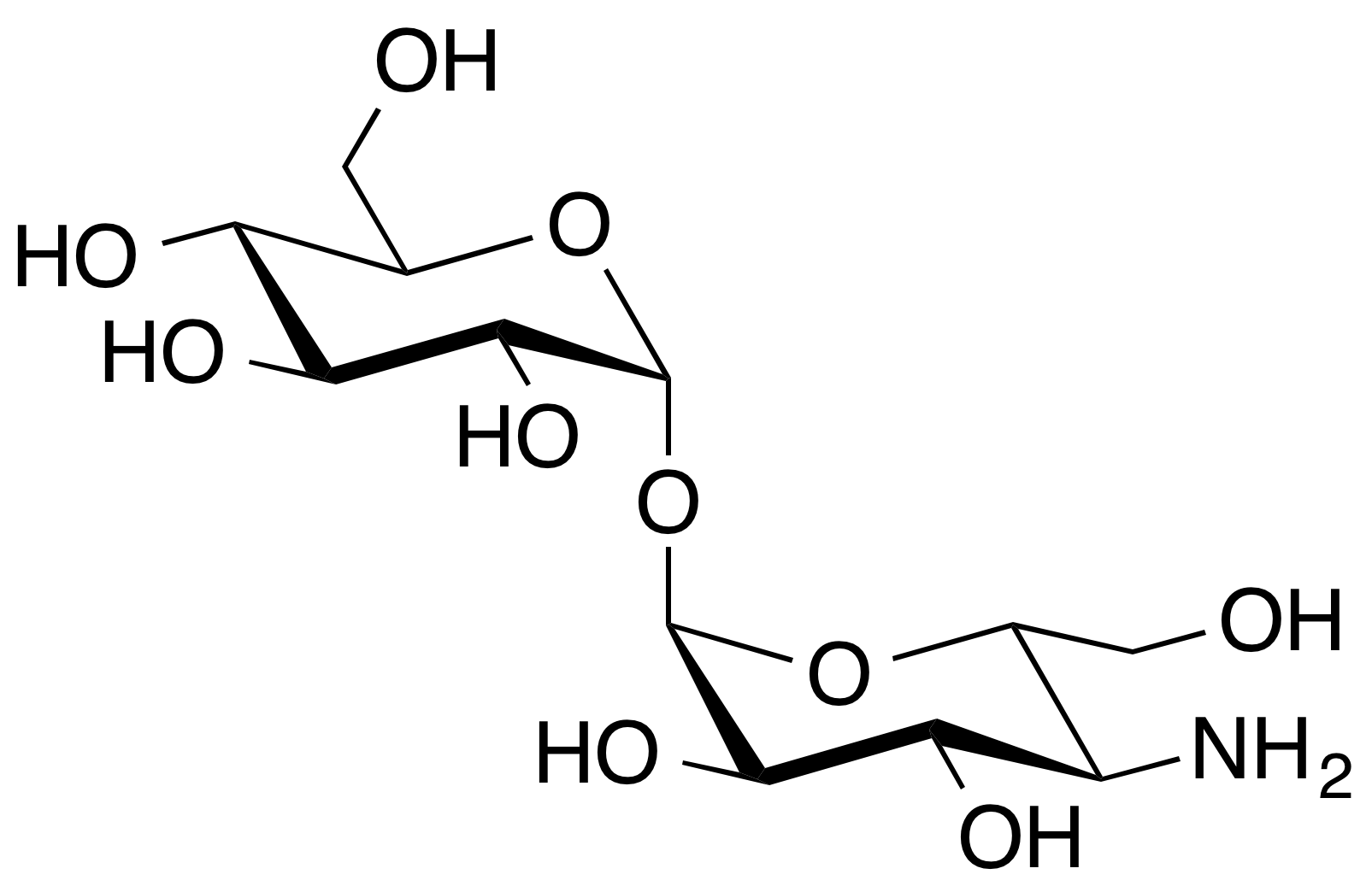
4-Trehalosamine
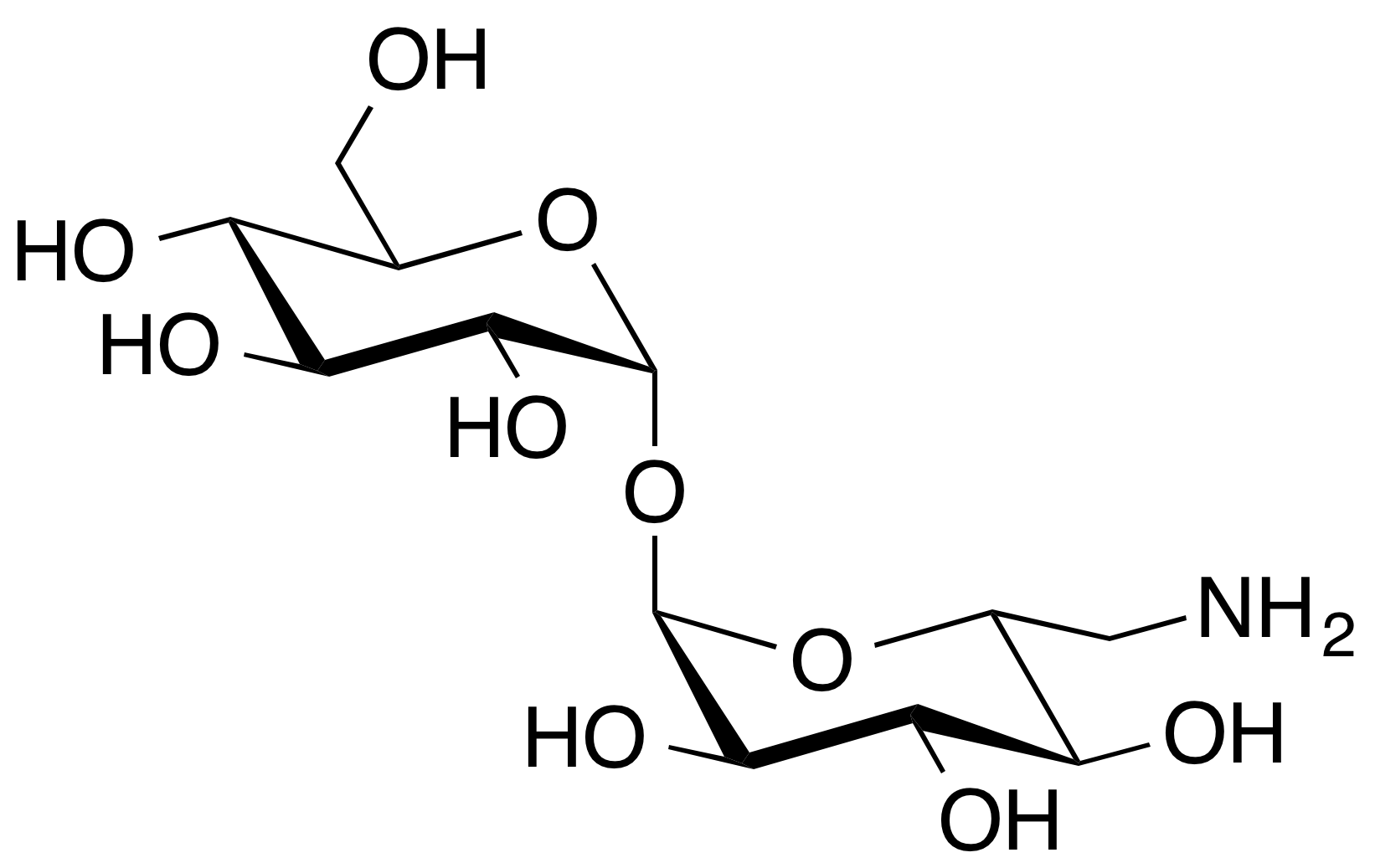
6-Trehalosamine

Identifiers
CAS Number	2: 27208-79-3; 3: 75060-25-2; 4: 51855-99-3; 6: 42891-37-2
3D model (JSmol)	2: Interactive image; 3: Interactive image; 4: Interactive image; 6: Interactive image
ChemSpider	2: 185417; 3: 168880; 4: 171609
PubChem CID	2: 213871; 3: 194651; 4: 198273; 6: 168435726
CompTox Dashboard (EPA)	3: DTXSID90996564; 4: DTXSID30966180
- InChI: 2: InChI=1S/C12H23NO10/c13-5-8(18)6(16)3(1-14)21-11(5)23-12-10(20)9(19)7(17)4(2-15)22-12/h3-12,14-20H,1-2,13H2/t3-,4-,5-,6-,7-,8-,9+,10-,11-,12-/m1/s1 Key: YSVQUZOHQULZQP-OCEKCAHXSA-N; 3: InChI=1S/C12H23NO10/c13-5-6(16)3(1-14)21-11(8(5)18)23-12-10(20)9(19)7(17)4(2-15)22-12/h3-12,14-20H,1-2,13H2/t3-,4-,5+,6-,7-,8-,9+,10-,11-,12-/m1/s1 Key: OHNBYBTUSOVUMK-PNKJYEMWSA-N; 4: InChI=1S/C12H23NO10/c13-5-3(1-14)21-11(9(19)7(5)17)23-12-10(20)8(18)6(16)4(2-15)22-12/h3-12,14-20H,1-2,13H2/t3-,4-,5-,6-,7+,8+,9-,10-,11-,12-/m1/s1 Key: GXKCUFUYTFWGNK-LIZSDCNHSA-N; 6: InChI=1S/C12H23NO10/c13-1-3-5(15)7(17)9(19)11(21-3)23-12-10(20)8(18)6(16)4(2-14)22-12/h3-12,14-20H,1-2,13H2/t3-,4-,5-,6-,7+,8+,9-,10-,11-,12-/m1/s1 Key: JMUYOTNYEBNHGG-LIZSDCNHSA-N
- SMILES: 2: C([C@@H]1[C@H]([C@@H]([C@H]([C@H](O1)O[C@@H]2[C@@H]([C@H]([C@@H]([C@H](O2)CO)O)O)O)N)O)O)O; 3: C([C@@H]1[C@H]([C@@H]([C@H]([C@H](O1)O[C@@H]2[C@@H]([C@H]([C@@H]([C@H](O2)CO)O)O)O)O)N)O)O; 4: C([C@@H]1[C@H]([C@@H]([C@H]([C@H](O1)O[C@@H]2[C@@H]([C@H]([C@@H]([C@H](O2)CO)O)O)O)O)O)N)O; 6: C([C@@H]1[C@H]([C@@H]([C@H]([C@H](O1)O[C@@H]2[C@@H]([C@H]([C@@H]([C@H](O2)CN)O)O)O)O)O)O)O
- Except where otherwise noted, data are given for materials in their standard state (at 25 °C [77 °F], 100 kPa). Infobox references

Trehalosamines are amino sugars in which a hydroxyl group of trehalose is replaced with an amino group. While 2-, 3-, and 4-trehalosamine derived from actinomycetes have been reported as natural compounds, 6-trehalosamine has been reported as a synthetic compound. They have weak antimicrobial activity and could be considered as a class of aminoglycoside antibiotics. The properties and functions of 4-trehalosamine have been well investigated as follows.

== Protective activity ==
As "a trehalose possessing an amino group", trehalosamine shares many properties and characteristics in common with trehalose; in addition, unique functions due to the presence of an amino group are also suggested. Trehalose is used as a protective agent for starch, protein, cells, or tissues due to its non-reducing sugar moiety having lower non-specific reactivity than reducing sugars and high moisturizing and protective activities. In many cases, 4-trehalosamine exhibits these protective activities either comparable to or marginally higher than those of trehalose. In addition, 4-trehalosamine exhibits a strong pH buffering activity near neutrality, while trehalose does not have such ability. Therefore, it is expected to be added to foods and industrial products as a trehalose-type moisturizing and protective agent with pH buffering ability.

== Effects on living organisms ==
Trehalose is known to exhibit autophagy-inducing activity, anti-inflammatory activity, molecular chaperone activity, or antioxidant activity in a broad sense in vivo. It is being studied for use as a treatment for neurodegenerative diseases and lifestyle-related diseases, as a medication, supplement, or as a prebiotic. However, as it is hydrolyzed in the body by trehalase, a trehalose-degrading enzyme, its physiological effect is limited. There is also concern that blood glucose levels may rise due to the generation of glucose as the degradation product. But, 4-trehalosamine is not degraded by human trehalase, and it has been confirmed in experiments with mice that it is non-toxic and does not raise blood sugar levels. For this reason, 4-trehalosamine is also attracting attention as a substitute for trehalose in these applications.

== As a starting material for synthesis of trehalose derivatives ==
Generally, saccharides have multiple hydroxyl groups in the molecule, and to systematically synthesize specific derivatives, complicated protocols such as repeated protection and deprotection are required. Although it is limited to the amino group site, various derivatives can be synthesized relatively easily by utilizing the reactivity different from that of the hydroxyl group of trehalosamine. Low-molecular-weight derivatives such as azide, surfactant IMCTA-C14, fluorescent or biotin-labeled derivatives have been developed so far, and application to the development of polymeric compounds containing periodic trehalose structures is also expected.
