= Yeast expression platform =

Strain of yeast used to produce large amounts of proteins, sugars, or other compounds

A yeast expression platform is a strain of yeast used to produce large amounts of proteins, sugars or other compounds for research or industrial uses. While yeast are often more resource-intensive to maintain than bacteria, certain products can only be produced by eukaryotic cells like yeast, necessitating use of a yeast expression platform. Yeasts differ in productivity and with respect to their capabilities to secrete, process and modify proteins. As such, different types of yeast (i.e. different expression platforms) are better suited for different research and industrial applications.

== Products ==
Since the onset of genetic engineering, a number of microorganisms have been developed for the production of biological products. These products are used in medicine and industry to create pharmaceuticals like hepatitis B vaccines or insulin. Common platforms for the development of medicine and other products include the bacterium E. coli, and several yeasts and mammalian cells (including, notably, Chinese hamster ovary cells). In general a microorganism used as an expression platform has to meet several criteria: it should be able grow rapidly in large containers, produce proteins in an efficient way (i.e. with minimal resource input), be safe and, in case of pharmaceuticals, it should produce and modify the products to be as ready for human consumption as possible.

== Strains used ==
Yeasts are common hosts for the production of proteins from recombinant DNA. They offer relatively easy genetic manipulation and rapid growth to high cell densities on inexpensive media. As eukaryotes, they are able to perform protein modifications like glycosylation which are common in eukaryotic cells, but relatively rare in bacteria. Due to this, yeast can produce complex proteins that are identical or very similar to native products from plants or mammals. The first yeast expression platform was based on the baker’s yeast Saccharomyces cerevisiae. However since then a variety of yeast expression platforms have been studied and are widely used for various applications based on their different characteristics and capabilities. For instance some of them grow on a wide range of carbon sources and are not restricted to glucose, as it is the case with baker’s yeast. Several of them are also applied to genetic engineering and to the production of foreign proteins.

=== Blastobotrys adeninivorans ===
Blastobotrys adeninivorans (also called Arxula adeninivorans) is a dimorphic yeast, meaning it grows as a budding yeast up to a temperature of 42 °C, but as a filamentous form at higher temperatures. B. adeninivorans has unusual biochemical characteristics. It can grow on a wide range of substrates and can assimilate nitrate. Strains of B. adeninivorans have been developed that can produce natural plastics, and have been involved in the development of a biosensor for estrogens in environmental samples.

=== Candida boidinii ===
Candida boidinii is a yeast notable for its ability to grow on methanol (called methylotrophism). Like other methylotrophic species such as Hansenula polymorpha and Pichia pastoris, it is used as a platform for the production of foreign proteins. Yields in a multigram range of a secreted foreign protein have been reported. A computational method, IPRO, recently predicted mutations that experimentally switched the cofactor specificity of Candida boidinii xylose reductase from NADPH to NADH.

=== Ogataea polymorpha ===
Ogataea polymorpha (synonyms Hansenula polymorpha or Pichia angusta) is another methylotrophic yeast (see Candida boidinii). It can grow on a wide range of other substrates; it is thermo-tolerant and can assimilate nitrate (see also Kluyveromyces lactis). It has been applied to the production of hepatitis B vaccines, insulin and interferon alpha-2a for the treatment of hepatitis C, as well as to a range of technical enzymes.

=== Kluyveromyces lactis ===
Kluyveromyces lactis is a yeast regularly used for the production of kefir. It can grow on several sugars, most importantly on lactose which is present in milk and whey. It has successfully been applied among others to the production of chymosin (an enzyme that is usually present in the stomach of calves) for the production of cheese. Production takes place in fermenters on a 40,000 L scale.

=== Pichia pastoris ===
Pichia pastoris is a methylotrophic yeast (see Candida boidinii and Hansenula polymorpha). It provides an efficient platform for the production of foreign proteins. Platform elements are available as a kit and it is worldwide used in academia for the production of proteins. Strains have been engineered that can produce complex human N-glycan (yeast glycans are similar but not identical to those found in humans).

=== Saccharomyces cerevisiae ===
Saccharomyces cerevisiae is the traditional baker’s yeast used widely in brewing and baking. Often the collective term “yeast” is used for this single species. As an expression platform it has successfully been applied to the production of technical enzymes and of pharmaceuticals like insulin and hepatitis B vaccines.

=== Yarrowia lipolytica ===
Yarrowia lipolytica is a dimorphic yeast (see Arxula adeninivorans) that can grow on a wide range of substrates. As such, it has a high potential for industrial applications but there are no recombinant products commercially available yet.

== Use ==
The various yeast expression platforms differ in several characteristics, including their productivity and with respect to their capabilities to secrete, to process and to modify proteins in particular examples. However, uses of all expression platforms have some basic similarities.

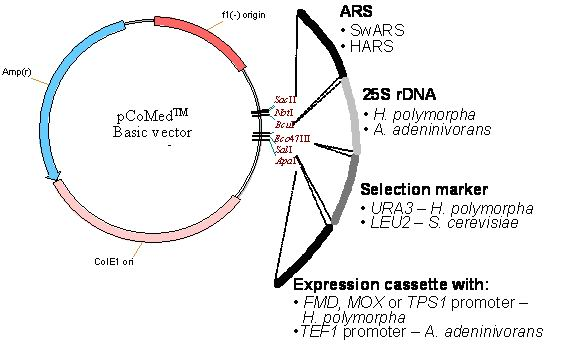
Fig. 1. Design and functionality of CoMed vector system. The CoMed basic vector contains all E. coli elements for propagation in the E. coli system and a MCS (multiple cloning ste) for integration of ARS, rDNA, selection marker and expression cassette modules. For this purpose, ARS fragments are flanked by SacII and BcuI restriction sites, rDNA regions by BcuI and Eco47III restriction sites, selection markers by Eco47III and SalI restriction sites and promoter elements by SalI and ApaI restriction sites.

In order to produce a desired product, suitable yeast strains are transformed with a vector that contains all necessary genetic elements for production of a biological product of interest. Vectors must also contain a selection marker, which is required to select yeast which have successfully taken up the vector from those which have not. Vectors also contain certain DNA elements allowing the yeast to incorporate the foreign DNA into the chromosome of the yeast and to replicate it. Most importantly, vectors contain a segment responsible for the production of the desired compound, called an expression cassette. The cassette contains a sequence of regulatory elements that control how much and under which circumstances a certain product is eventually made. This is followed by the gene for the biological product itself. The expression cassette is terminated by a terminator sequence that stops of the transcription of the expressed gene.
