= Issatchenkia =

Scientific classification
- Kingdom: Fungi
- Division: Ascomycota
- Class: Pichiomycetes
- Order: Pichiales
- Family: Pichiaceae
- Genus: Issatchenkia; V.I.Kudriavzev, 1960

Genus of fungi

Issatchenkia is a genus of fungi belonging to the family Pichiaceae.

The genus has cosmopolitan distribution.

Species:

- Issatchenkia hanoiensis Thanh, Hai & Lachance, 2003
- Issatchenkia orientalis Kudryavtsev
