= Α,α-Trehalase =

Class of enzymes

α,α-Trehalase

Identifiers
- EC no.: 3.2.1.28
- CAS no.: 9025-52-9

Databases
- BRENDA: enzyme data
- ExPASy: NiceZyme view
- KEGG: enzyme entry
- MetaCyc: metabolic pathway
- Rhea: reactions
- PDB structures: RCSB PDB PDBe PDBsum
- Gene Ontology: AmiGO / QuickGO
Search
- PMC: articles
- PubMed: articles
- NCBI: proteins

An α,α-trehalase (EC 3.2.1.28) is an enzyme with systematic name α,α-trehalose glucohydrolase. This enzyme catalyzes the chemical reaction

trehalose
H_{2}O
2
glucose

The reaction gives at first equimolar amounts of α- and β-D-glucose. The enzyme is a hydrolase, specifically a glycosidase that hydrolyses O- and S-glycosyl compounds. It is also called trehalase, and it participates in starch and sucrose metabolism.

== Structural studies ==
As of late 2007, two structures have been solved for this class of enzymes, with PDB accession codes PDB: 2JF4 and PDB: 2JG0.
