= Long-chain-alcohol oxidase =

Class of enzymes

long-chain-alcohol oxidase

Identifiers
- EC no.: 1.1.3.20
- CAS no.: 129430-50-8

Databases
- BRENDA: enzyme data
- ExPASy: NiceZyme view
- KEGG: enzyme entry
- MetaCyc: metabolic pathway
- Rhea: reactions
- PDB structures: RCSB PDB PDBe PDBsum
- Gene Ontology: AmiGO / QuickGO
Search
- PMC: articles
- PubMed: articles
- NCBI: proteins

Long-chain alcohol oxidase is one of two enzyme classes that oxidize long-chain or fatty alcohols to aldehydes. It has been found in certain Candida yeast, where it participates in omega oxidation of fatty acids to produce acyl-CoA for energy or industrial use, as well as in other fungi, plants, and bacteria.

== Mechanism ==
Long-chain alcohol oxidase catalyzes the chemical reaction

long-chain alcohol + O_{2} $\rightleftharpoons$ 2 long-chain aldehyde + 2 H_{2}O_{2}

Thus, the two substrates of this enzyme are long-chain/fatty alcohol and O_{2}, whereas its two products are long-chain/fatty aldehyde and hydrogen peroxide.

This enzyme belongs to the family of oxidoreductases, specifically those acting on the CH-OH group of donor with oxygen as acceptor. The systematic name of this enzyme class is long-chain-alcohol:oxygen oxidoreductase. Other names in common use include long-chain fatty alcohol oxidase, fatty alcohol oxidase, fatty alcohol:oxygen oxidoreductase, and long-chain fatty acid oxidase.

== Structure ==
The enzyme is an octamer of ~46kD subunits (except in C. tropicalis, in which it is a dimer of subunits ~70kD). It is a Cytochrome c oxidase containing a covalently-bound heme group using the Cys-X-X-Cys-His motif. It also contains flavin to assist in oxidation-reduction. The enzyme is bound to the endoplasmic reticulum membrane.

Long-chain fatty alcohol oxidases vary between species in their specificity; some species have multiple different alcohol oxidases. They generally have a broad range of substrates, ranging from short chain alcohols starting at 4 carbons to the longest long-chain alcohols at 22 carbons. Some can also oxidize select diols, secondary alcohols, hydroxy fatty acids, and even long-chain aldehydes. However, each enzyme is optimized to function for specific alcohol, often between 10 and 16 carbons. In at least one species, the enzyme was stereoselective for the R(-) entantiomer.

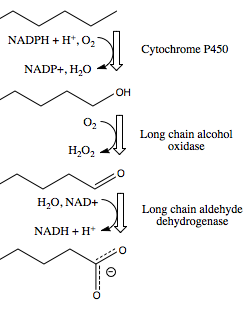
The long-chain alkane/omega-oxidation pathway, from alkane to carboxylic acid.

== Function ==
This enzyme can be induced in many Candida yeast strains by growing them on long-chain alkanes as the major food source. Long-chain fatty alcohol oxidases participate in omega-oxidation of long chain alkanes or fatty acids. The alkane is first oxidized to an alcohol by an enzyme of the Cytochrome P450 family using NADPH. This alcohol is oxidized by long-chain fatty alcohol oxidase in yeast.

(This is different from the pathway found in mammalian tissues, which employs long-chain fatty alcohol dehydrogenase or fatty alcohol:NAD+ oxidoreductase and requires NAD+. Yeast have low levels of fatty alcohol dehydrogenase.)

The long-chain alcohol is then oxidized by long-chain fatty aldehyde dehydrogenase to a carboxylic acid, also producing NADH from NAD+. Fatty acids can be oxidized again to make dicarboxylic species that join with coenzyme A and enter the beta oxidation pathway in the peroxisome.

Long-chain alcohol oxidase is also used in germinating seedlings of jojoba (Simmondsia chinensis) to degrade esterified long-chain fatty alcohols stored as wax.

== Species ==
This enzyme has been found in the following organisms:

Yeast

Candida cloacae

Candida tropicalis

Starmerella bombicola

Yarrowia lipolytica

Other Fungi

Aspergillus terreus

Mucor circinelloides

Plants

Arabidopsis thaliana (thale cress)

Lotus japonicus

Simmondsia chinensis (jojoba)

Tanacetum vulgare (common tansy)

Archaea

Uncultured marine euryarchaeota

== Industrial use ==
This enzyme is required for production of dicarboxylic acids by industrial Candida yeast, which have nonfunctional beta oxidation pathways. They can thus produce relatively pure saturated and unsaturated dicarboxylic acids in high yield, which is not possible using chemical synthesis. The dicarboxylic acids are used to produce fragrances, polyamides, polyesters, adhesives, and antibiotics.
