= Blastobotrys adeninivorans =

Scientific classification
- Kingdom: Fungi
- Division: Ascomycota
- Class: Dipodascomycetes
- Order: Dipodascales
- Family: Trichomonascaceae
- Genus: Blastobotrys
- Species: B. adeninivorans

Binomial name
- Blastobotrys adeninivorans (Middelhoven, Hoogk. Niet & Kreger-van Rij) Kurtzman & Robnett (2007)

Synonyms
- Trichosporon adeninivorans Middelhoven, Hoogk. Niet & Kreger (1984); Arxula adeninivorans (Middelhoven, Hoogk.Niet & Kreger) Van der Walt, M.T.Sm. & Y.Yamada (1990)

Species of fungus

Blastobotrys adeninivorans (Arxula adeninivorans) is a dimorphic yeast with unusual characteristics. The first description of B. adeninivorans was provided in 1984. The species was initially designated as Trichosporon adeninovorans. After the first identification in the Netherlands, strains of this species were later on also found in Siberia and in South Africa in soil and in wood hydrolysates. Recently, A. adeninivorans was renamed as Blastobotrys adeninivorans after a detailed phylogenetic comparison with other related yeast species. However, many scientists desire to maintain the popular name A. adeninivorans.

== Characteristics ==
All B. adeninivorans strains share unusual biochemical activities being able to assimilate a range of amines, adenine (hence the name B. adeninivorans) and several other purine compounds as sole energy and carbon source, they all share properties like nitrate assimilation, they are thermo-tolerant (they can grow at temperatures of up to 48 °C or 118 °F). A special feature of biotechnological impact is a temperature-dependent dimorphism. At temperatures above 42 °C (108 °F) a reversible transition from budding cells to mycelial forms is induced. Budding is re-established when cultivation temperature is decreased below 42 °C (108 °F).

== Biotechnological potential ==
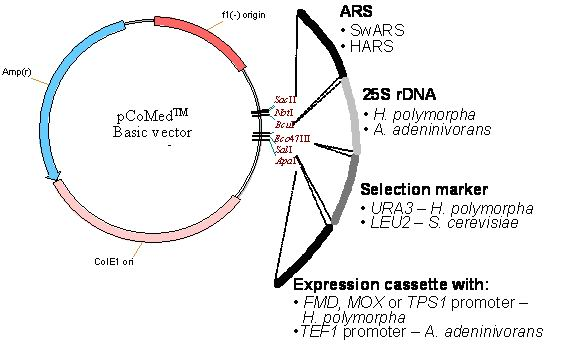
Design and functionality of CoMed vector system. The CoMed basic vector contains all E. coli elements for propagation in the E. coli system and a MCS (multiple cloning ste) for integration of ARS, rDNA, selection marker and expression cassette modules. For this purpose, ARS fragments are flanked by SacII and BcuI restriction sites, rDNA regions by BcuI and Eco47III restriction sites, selection markers by Eco47III and SalI restriction sites and romoter elements by SalI and ApaI restriction sites.

The characteristics described above make B. adeninivorans attractive for biotechnological applications. It is a source for many enzymes, for instance glucoamylase, tannase, lipase, phosphatases and many others. It is an organism that can be genetically engineered to produce foreign proteins. Suitable host strains can be transformed with plasmids. The basic design of such plasmids is similar to that described under Hansenula polymorpha and yeast expression platforms.

Here are two special examples of recombinant strains and their application: in both cases several plasmids with different foreign product genes were introduced into the yeast. In a first case this recombinant yeast strain acquired the capability to produce natural plastics, namely PHA (polyhydroxyalkanoates). For this purpose a new synthetic pathway had to be transferred into this organism consisting of three enzymes. The respective genes phbA, phbB and phbC were isolated from the bacterium Ralstonia eutropha and integrated into plasmids. These plasmids were introduced into the organism. The resulting recombinant strain was able to produce the plastic material.

In the second example a biosensor for the detection of estrogenic activities in wastewater has been developed. In this case the route how estrogens act in nature was mimicked. A gene for the human estrogen receptor alpha (hERalpha) contained on a first plasmid was initially introduced. The protein encoded by this gene recognizes and binds estrogens. The complex is then bound to a second gene contained on a second plasmid that becomes activated upon binding. In this case a gene sequence of a reporter gene (the gene product can be easily monitored by simple assays) was fused to a control sequence (a promoter) responsive to the estrogen/receptor complex. Such strains can be cultured in the presence of wastewater and the estrogens present in such samples can be easily quantified by the amount of the reporter gene product.
