= Lentztrehalose =

Bioactive Natural Product

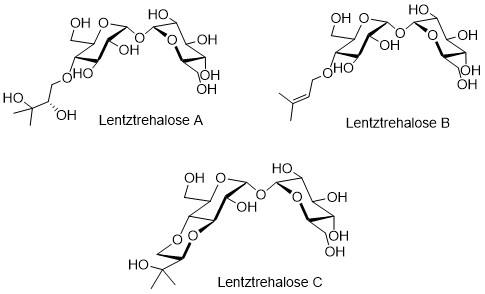
Chemical structures of lentztrehalose A, B, and C

Lentztrehaloses are a group of trehalose derivatives found in an actinomycete Lentzea sp. ML457-mF8. There are three members of the class, named lentztrehalose A, B, and C. Lentztrehaloses A and B can be synthesized chemically.

The non-reducing disaccharide trehalose is commonly used in foods and various products as stabilizer and humectant, respectively. Trehalose has been shown to have curative effects for treating various diseases in animal models including neurodegenerative diseases, hepatic diseases, and arteriosclerosis. Trehalose, however, is readily digested by hydrolytic enzyme trehalase that is widely expressed in many organisms from microbes to human. As a result, trehalose may cause decomposition of the containing products, and its medicinal effect may be reduced by the hydrolysis by trehalase. Lentztrehaloses are rarely hydrolyzed by microbial and mammalian trehalases and may be used in various areas as a biologically stable substitute of trehalose.
