= Secondary-alcohol oxidase =

Class of enzymes

Identifiers
- EC no.: 1.1.3.18
- CAS no.: 71245-08-4

Databases
- IntEnz: IntEnz view
- BRENDA: BRENDA entry
- ExPASy: NiceZyme view
- KEGG: KEGG entry
- MetaCyc: metabolic pathway
- PRIAM: profile
- PDB structures: RCSB PDB PDBe PDBsum
Search
- PMC: articles
- PubMed: articles
- NCBI: proteins

In enzymology, a secondary-alcohol oxidase (EC 1.1.3.18) is an enzyme that catalyzes the chemical reaction

a secondary alcohol + O_{2} $\rightleftharpoons$ a ketone + H_{2}O_{2}

Thus, the two substrates of this enzyme are secondary alcohol and O_{2}, whereas its two products are ketone and H_{2}O_{2}.

This enzyme belongs to the family of oxidoreductases, specifically those acting on the CH-OH group of donor with oxygen as acceptor. The systematic name of this enzyme class is secondary-alcohol:oxygen oxidoreductase. Other names in common use include polyvinyl alcohol oxidase, and secondary alcohol oxidase.
