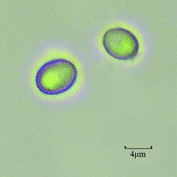
- Komagataella phaffii GS115

Scientific classification
- Kingdom: Fungi
- Division: Ascomycota
- Subdivision: Saccharomycotina
- Class: Pichiomycetes
- Order: Pichiales
- Family: Pichiaceae
- Genus: Komagataella; Y. Yamada, M. Matsuda, K. Maeda & Mikata, 1995

Species
- See text

= Komagataella =

Genus of fungus used industrially and as model organism

Komagataella is a methylotrophic yeast within the order Pichiales. It was found in the 1960s as Pichia pastoris, with its feature of using methanol as a source of carbon and energy. In 1995, P. pastoris was reassigned into the sole representative of genus Komagataella, becoming Komagataella pastoris. In 2005, it was found that almost all strains used industrially and in labs are a separate species, K. phaffii. Later studies have further distinguished new species in this genus, resulting in a total of 7 recognized species. It is not uncommon to see the old name still in use in the context of protein production, as of 2023; in less formal use, the yeast may confusingly be referred to as pichia.

After years of study, Komagataella is widely used in biochemical research and biotech industries. With strong potential for being an expression system for protein production, as well as being a model organism for genetic study, Komagataella phaffii has become important for biological research and biotech applications.

== Taxonomy ==
According to GBIF:

- Komagataella kurtzmanii G.I.Naumov, E.S.Naumova, Tyurin & Kozlov, 2013
- Komagataella mondaviorum G.I.Naumov, E.S.Naumova & K.L.Boundy-Mills, 2018
- Komagataella pastoris (Guillierm., 1919) Y.Yamada, M.Matsuda, K.Maeda & Mikata, 1995
- Komagataella phaffii Kurtzman, 2005 – responsible for most, if not all, industrial & research use
- Komagataella populi Kurtzman, 2012
- Komagataella pseudopastoris (Dlauchy, Tornai-Leh., Fülöp & G.Péter, 2003) Kurtzman, 2005
- Komagataella ulmi Kurtzman, 2012

== Komagataella in nature ==
=== Natural habitat ===
In nature, Komagataella is found on trees, such as chestnut trees. They are heterotrophs and they can use several carbon sources for living, like glucose, glycerol and methanol. However, they cannot use lactose.

=== Reproduction ===
Komagataella can undergo both asexual reproduction and sexual reproduction, by budding and ascospore. In this case, two types of cells of Komagataella exist: haploid and diploid cells. In the asexual life cycle, haploid cells undergo mitosis for reproduction. In the sexual life cycle, diploid cells undergo sporulation and meiosis. The growth rate of its colonies can vary by a large range, from near to 0 to a doubling time of one hour, which is suitable for industrial processes.

== Komagataella as a model organism ==
In the last few years, Komagataella was investigated and identified as a good model organism with several advantages. First of all, Komagataella can be grown and used easily in lab. Like other widely used yeast models, it has relatively short life span and fast regeneration time. Moreover, some inexpensive culture media have been designed, so that Komagataella can grow quickly on them, with high cell density. Whole genome sequencing for Komagataella has been performed. The K. phaffii GS115 genome has been sequenced by the Flanders Institute for Biotechnology and Ghent University, and published in Nature Biotechnology. The genome sequence and gene annotation can be browsed through the ORCAE system. The complete genomic data allows scientists to identify homologous proteins and evolutionary relationships between other yeast species and Komagataella. In addition, all seven species were sequenced by 2022. Furthermore, Komagataella are single eukaryotic cells, which means researchers could investigate the proteins inside Komagataella. Then the homologous comparison to other more complicated eukaryotic species can be processed, to obtain their functions and origins.

Another advantage of Komagataella is its similarity to the well-studied yeast model — Saccharomyces cerevisiae. As a model organism for biology, S. cerevisiae have been well studied for decades and used by researchers for various purposes throughout history. The two yeast genera; Pichia (sensu lato) and Saccharomyces, have similar growth conditions and tolerances; thus, the culture of Komagataella can be adopted by labs without many modifications. Moreover, unlike S. cerevisiae, Komagataella has the ability to functionally process proteins with large molecular weight, which is useful in a translational host. Considering all the advantages, Komagataella can be usefully employed as both a genetic and experimental model organism.

=== Komagataella as a genetic model organism ===
As a genetic model organism, Komagataella can be used for genetic analysis and large-scale genetic crossing, with complete genome data and its ability to carry out complex eukaryotic genetic processing in a relatively small genome. The functional genes for peroxisome assembly were investigated by comparing wild-type and mutant strains of Komagataella.

=== Komagataella as an experimental model organism ===
As an experimental model organism, Komagataella was mainly used as the host system for transformation. Due to its abilities of recombination with foreign DNA and processing large proteins, much research has been carried out to investigate the possibility of producing new proteins and the function of artificially designed proteins, using Komagataella as a transformation host. In the last decade, Komagataella was engineered to build expression system platforms, which is a typical application for a standard experimental model organism, as described below.

== Komagataella as expression system platform ==
Komagataella is frequently used as an expression system for the production of heterologous proteins. Several properties make Komagataella suited for this task. Currently, several strains of Komagataella are used for biotechnical purposes, with significant differences among them in growth and protein production. Some common variants possess a mutation in the HIS4 gene, leading to the selection of cells which are transformed successfully with expression vectors. The technology for vector integration into Komagataella genome is similar to that in Saccharomyces cerevisiae.

=== Advantage ===
1. Komagataella is able to grow on simple, inexpensive medium, with high growth rate. Komagataella can grow in either shake flasks or a fermenter, which makes it suitable for both small- and large-scale production.
2. Komagataella has two alcohol oxidase genes, Aox1 and Aox2, which include strongly inducible promoters. These two genes allow Komagataella to use methanol as a carbon and energy source. The AOX promoters are induced by methanol, and repressed by glucose. Usually, the gene for the desired protein is introduced under the control of the Aox1 promoter, which means that protein production can be induced by the addition of methanol on medium. After several researches, scientists found that the promoter derived from AOX1 gene in Komagataella is extremely suitable to control the expression of foreign genes, which had been transformed into the Komagataella genome, producing heterologous proteins.
3. With a key trait, Komagataella can grow with extremely high cell density on the culture. This feature is compatible with heterologous protein expression, giving higher yields of production.
4. Komagataella has a well-developed secretory pathway involving the Endoplasmic reticulum and a stacked Golgi apparatus, which is more similar to those of higher eukaryotes to that of Saccharomyces cerevisiae. This enables the efficient folding and post-translational modification of heterologous proteins, including the formation of disulfide bonds and glycosylation. This process allows many recombinant proteins to be secreted as soluble, physiologically active forms into the culture medium.
5. The technology required for genetic manipulation of Komagataella is similar to that of Saccharomyces cerevisiae, which is one of the most well-studied yeast model organisms. As a result, the experiment protocol and materials are easy to build for Komagataella.

=== Disadvantage ===
As some proteins require chaperonin for proper folding, Komagataella is unable to produce a number of proteins, since it does not contain the appropriate chaperones. The technologies of introducing genes of mammalian chaperonins into the yeast genome and overexpressing existing chaperonins still require improvement.

=== Comparison with other expression systems ===
In standard molecular biology research, the bacterium Escherichia coli is the most frequently used organism for expression system, to produce heterologous proteins, due to its features of fast growth rate, high protein production rate, as well as undemanding growth conditions. Protein production in E. coli is usually faster than that in Komagataella, with reasons: Competent E. coli cells can be stored frozen, and thawed before use, whereas Komagataella cells have to be produced immediately before use. Expression yields in Komagataella vary between different clones, so that a large number of clones has to be screened for protein production, to find the best producer. The biggest advantage of Komagataella over E. coli is that Komagataella is capable of forming disulfide bonds and glycosylations in proteins, but E. coli cannot. E. coli might produce a misfolded protein when disulfides are included in final product, leading to inactive or insoluble forms of proteins.

The well-studied Saccharomyces cerevisiae is also used as an expression system with similar advantages over E. coli as Komagataella. However Komagataella has two main advantages over S. cerevisiae in laboratory and industrial settings:

1. Komagataella, as mentioned above, is a methylotroph, meaning that it can grow with the simple methanol, as the only source of energy — Komagataella can grow fast in cell suspension with reasonably strong methanol solution, which would kill most other micro-organisms. In this case, the expression system is cheap to set up and maintain.
2. Komagataella can grow up to a very high cell density. Under ideal conditions, it can multiply to the point where the cell suspension is practically a paste. As the protein yield from expression system in a microbe is roughly equal to the product of the proteins produced per cell, which makes Komagataella of great use when trying to produce large quantities of protein without expensive equipment.

Comparing to other expression systems, such as S2-cells from Drosophila melanogaster and Chinese hamster ovary cells, Komagataella usually gives much better yields. Generally, cell lines from multicellular organisms require complex and expensive types of media, including amino acids, vitamins, as well as other growth factors. These types of media significantly increase the cost of producing heterologous proteins. Additionally, Komagataella can grow in media containing only one carbon source and one nitrogen source, which is suitable for isotopic labelling applications, like protein NMR.

== Industrial applications ==
Komagataella have been used in several kinds of biotech industries, such as pharmaceutical industry. All the applications are based on its feature of expressing proteins.

=== Biotherapeutic production ===
In the last few years, Komagataella had been used for the production of over 500 types of biotherapeutics, such as IFNγ. At the beginning, one drawback of this protein expression system is the over-glycosylation with high density of mannose structure, which is a potential cause of immunogenicity. In 2006, a research group managed to create a new strain called YSH597. (Note: YSH597 is based on strain NRRL-Y11430, now considered part of K. phaffi.) This strain can express erythropoietin in its normal glycosylation form, by exchanging the enzymes responsible for the fungal type glycosylation, with the mammalian homologs. Thus, the altered glycosylation pattern allowed the protein to be fully functional.

=== Enzyme production ===
A significant milestone in the use of K. phaffii in food technology was its GRAS classification by the US Food and Drug Administration, alongside their approval of recombinant proteins. It is now used to produce various enzymes that serve as processing aids and food additives. In bakery production, enzymes produced by genetically modified Komagataella can maintain bread freshness and compensate for variations in flour and malt quality. In brewing, they can reduce beer's alcohol content or modify the flavour and filtration properties of wine. Recombinant expressed phospholipase C is used to degum high-phosphorus vegetable oils by hydrolysing phospholipids. In animal feed, phytase produced by K. phaffii breaks down phytic acid, an antinutrient.

Recently, K. phaffii has been used increasingly to produce soy leghemoglobin, a plant heme protein that gives plant-based meat analogues their colour and flavour. This expands the industrial application of K. phaffii from technical enzymes towards functional food ingredients. For this purpose, the yeast utilises its strong methanol-inducible promoters and efficient secretion to produce functional leghemoglobin for use as a food ingredient. Through strain engineering, including optimisation of heme biosynthesis and signal peptides, and controlled fed-batch fermentation, gram-per-litre titres of secreted leghemoglobin have been achieved. This makes large-scale production for meat analogues economically viable.
