= Nakazawaea =

Scientific classification
- Kingdom: Fungi
- Division: Ascomycota
- Class: Pichiomycetes
- Order: Alaninales
- Family: Pachysolenaceae
- Genus: Nakazawaea; Y.Yamada, K.Maeda & Mikata (1994)

Type species
- Nakazawaea holstii (Wick.) Y.Yamada, K.Maeda & Mikata (1994)

Genus of fungi

Nakazawaea is a genus of yeast in the order Alaninales. The relationship of this taxon to other taxa within the order is not fully unknown (incertae sedis).

In 2022, DNA analysis of Saccharomycotina yeasts noted that Peterozyma toletana, Peterozyma tannophilus and Nakazawaea holstii are in a monophyletic sister clade to the Pichiaceae family.

Originally, a monotypic genus containing the single species Nakazawaea holstii but Nakazawaea siamensis was added in 2011. With further others added later.

The genus name of Nakazawaea is in honour of Dr. Ryoji Nakazawa, who was a Japanese microbiologist and Director of the Institute for Fermentation, Osaka, Japan, in recognition of his contributions to yeast taxonomy.

The genus was circumscribed by Yuzo Yamada, Kojiro Maeda and Kozaburo Mikata in Biosc., Biotechn. Biochem. vol.58 (Issue 7) on page 1256 in 1994.

== Species ==
As accepted by GBIF;

- Nakazawaea ambrosiae Kachalkin, Tomashevskaya, T.A.Kuznetsova & M.V.Vecherskii
- Nakazawaea anatomiae (Zwillenb.) Kurtzman & Robnett
- Nakazawaea ernobii (Lodder & Kreger-van Rij) Kurtzman & Robnett
- Nakazawaea holstii (Wick.) Y.Yamada, K.Maeda & Mikata
- Nakazawaea ishiwadae (Sugiy. & Goto) Kurtzman & Robnett
- Nakazawaea laoshanensis (F.L.Li & S.A.Wang) Kurtzman & Robnett
- Nakazawaea molendini-olei (Čadež, Turchetti & G.Péter) Kurtzman & Robnett, 2014
- Nakazawaea peltata (Yarrow) Kurtzman & Robnett
- Nakazawaea pomicola (Kurtzman, Robnett & Yarrow) Kurtzman & Robnett
- Nakazawaea populi (Hagler, Mend.-Hagler & Phaff) Kurtzman & Robnett
- Nakazawaea siamensis R.Kaewwichian, W.Yongmanitchai, H.Kawasaki & S.Limtong, 2014
- Nakazawaea todaengensis Polburee, M.Groenew. & S.Limtong
- Nakazawaea wickerhamii (Capr.) Kurtzman & Robnett
- Nakazawaea wyomingensis (Kurtzman) Kurtzman & Robnett

== Uses ==
Nakazawaea molendini-olei is found in the yeast of Black olive pomace (remains), and is used to make oleuropein.
