= Aryl-alcohol oxidase =

Class of enzymes

aryl-alcohol oxidase

Identifiers
- EC no.: 1.1.3.7
- CAS no.: 9028-77-7

Databases
- IntEnz: IntEnz view
- BRENDA: BRENDA entry
- ExPASy: NiceZyme view
- KEGG: KEGG entry
- MetaCyc: metabolic pathway
- PRIAM: profile
- PDB structures: RCSB PDB PDBe PDBsum
- Gene Ontology: AmiGO / QuickGO
Search
- PMC: articles
- PubMed: articles
- NCBI: proteins

In enzymology, an aryl-alcohol oxidase (EC 1.1.3.7) is an enzyme that catalyzes the chemical reaction

an aromatic primary alcohol + O_{2} $\rightleftharpoons$ an aromatic aldehyde + H_{2}O_{2}

An example is the oxidation of benzyl alcohol to benzaldehyde.

benzyl alcohol
O_{2}
H_{2}O_{2}
O_{2}
H_{2}O_{2}
benzaldehyde

The two substrates of this enzyme are an aromatic primary alcohol and oxygen. Its products are the corresponding aromatic aldehyde and hydrogen peroxide.

This enzyme belongs to the family of oxidoreductases, specifically those acting on the CH-OH group of donor with oxygen as acceptor. The systematic name of this enzyme class is aryl-alcohol:oxygen oxidoreductase. Other names in common use include aryl alcohol oxidase, veratryl alcohol oxidase, and arom. alcohol oxidase.

== Structural studies ==
As of late 2007, 4 structures have been solved for this class of enzymes, with PDB accession codes 1E8F, 1E8H, 1QLT, and 1QLU.
