= Ogataea methanolica =

Scientific classification
- Kingdom: Fungi
- Division: Ascomycota
- Class: Saccharomycetes
- Order: Saccharomycetales
- Family: Pichiaceae
- Genus: Ogataea
- Species: O. methanolica

Binomial name
- Ogataea methanolica (Makig.) Kurtzman & Robnett 2010

Synonyms
- Pichia cellobiosa J.D. Lee & Komag. 1980<; Pichia aganobii Urakami & Michimi 1977; Pichia methanolica Makig. 1974

Species of fungus

Ogataea methanolica is a homothallic haploid organism that offers many of the advantages of a eukaryotic expression system such as protein processing and protein folding, while being as easy to manipulate as E. coli or Saccharomyces cerevisiae. It is faster, easier, and less expensive to use than other eukaryotic expression systems such as baculovirus or mammalian tissue culture, and generally gives higher expression levels. As a yeast, it shares the advantages of molecular and genetic manipulations with Saccharomyces, and it has the added advantage of 10- to 100-fold higher heterologous protein expression levels. These features make O. methanolica very useful as a protein expression system.
