= Sympodomyces =

Scientific classification
- Kingdom: Fungi
- Division: Ascomycota
- Class: Laboulbeniomycetes
- Order: Laboulbeniales
- Family: Laboulbeniaceae
- Genus: Sympodomyces; R.K. Benj.

Type species
- Sympodomyces pentacellularis R.K. Benj.

Genus of fungi

Sympodomyces is a genus of fungi in the family Laboulbeniaceae. A monotypic genus, it contains the single species Sympodomyces pentacellularis.
