= Long-chain-alcohol dehydrogenase =

Catalytic enzyme

long-chain-alcohol dehydrogenase

Identifiers
- EC no.: 1.1.1.192
- CAS no.: 76774-36-2

Databases
- IntEnz: IntEnz view
- BRENDA: BRENDA entry
- ExPASy: NiceZyme view
- KEGG: KEGG entry
- MetaCyc: metabolic pathway
- PRIAM: profile
- PDB structures: RCSB PDB PDBe PDBsum
- Gene Ontology: AmiGO / QuickGO
Search
- PMC: articles
- PubMed: articles
- NCBI: proteins

In enzymology, a long-chain-alcohol dehydrogenase (EC 1.1.1.192) is an enzyme that catalyzes the chemical reaction

a long-chain alcohol + 2 NAD^{+} + H_{2}O $\rightleftharpoons$ a long-chain carboxylate + 2 NADH + 2 H^{+}

The 3 substrates of this enzyme are long-chain alcohol, NAD^{+}, and H_{2}O, whereas its 3 products are long-chain carboxylate, NADH, and H^{+}.

This enzyme belongs to the family of oxidoreductases, specifically those acting on the CH-OH group of donor with NAD^{+} or NADP^{+} as acceptor. The systematic name of this enzyme class is long-chain-alcohol:NAD^{+} oxidoreductase. Other names in common use include long-chain alcohol dehydrogenase, and fatty alcohol oxidoreductase. This enzyme participates in fatty acid metabolism.
