= IMCTA-C14 =

Identifiers
3D model (JSmol)	Interactive image
PubChem CID	170915881
- InChI: InChI=1S/C26H51NO10/c1-2-3-4-5-6-7-8-9-10-11-12-13-14-27-19-17(15-28)35-25(23(33)21(19)31)37-26-24(34)22(32)20(30)18(16-29)36-26/h17-34H,2-16H2,1H3/t17-,18-,19-,20-,21+,22+,23-,24-,25-,26-/m1/s1 Key: CBNACTPWHANYMM-PCIRLDFKSA-N
- SMILES: C([C@@H]1[C@H]([C@@H]([C@H]([C@H](O1)O[C@@H]2[C@@H]([C@H]([C@@H]([C@H](O2)CO)O)O)O)O)O)NCCCCCCCCCCCCCC)O

Properties
Chemical formula	C_{26}H_{51}NO_{10}
Molar mass	537.691 g·mol^{−1}
- Except where otherwise noted, data are given for materials in their standard state (at 25 °C [77 °F], 100 kPa). Infobox references

IMCTA-C14 is an N-tetradecyl (C14) derivative of trehalosamine, a bacterial metabolite. It was synthesized as a sugar-based surfactant containing a trehalose substructure from the condensation of 4-trehalosamine and tetradecanal. Its surfactant properties are not very different from those of other sugar-based surfactant with aliphatic chains of similar length. However, IMCTA-C14 shows similar biological activity to trehalose at low concentrations.

For the induction of autophagy in cultured cells, trehalose is required at a high concentration of about 10-100 mM. In contrast, IMCTA-C14 shows similar activity at about 1/3000 of that concentration. To illustrate this, expression of the metabolic clock gene, Period 1, was induced more strongly in cultured hepatocytes at a concentration 1/1000 that of trehalose. The reason for its strong biological activity is thought to be that it has a fatty chain length similar to that of the phospholipids that make up the cell membrane, and a highly basic secondary amine. This gives it a strong affinity for the cell membrane, thereby enhancing its proximity to and effect on the glucose transporter and sweet taste receptor, membrane proteins, the functions of which are modulated by trehalose and other carbohydrates.
