= Blastobotrys =

Scientific classification
- Kingdom: Fungi
- Division: Ascomycota
- Class: Dipodascomycetes
- Order: Dipodascales
- Family: Trichomonascaceae
- Genus: Blastobotrys; Klopotek, 1967

Genus of fungi

Blastobotrys is a genus of fungi belonging to the family Trichomonascaceae.

The genus has cosmopolitan distribution.

== Species ==
Species:

- Blastobotrys adeninivorans (Middelhoven, Hoogk.Niet & Kreger-van Rij) Kurtzman & Robnett
- Blastobotrys americanus Kurtzman
- Blastobotrys arbuscula de Hoog, Rant.-Leht. & M.T.Sm.
