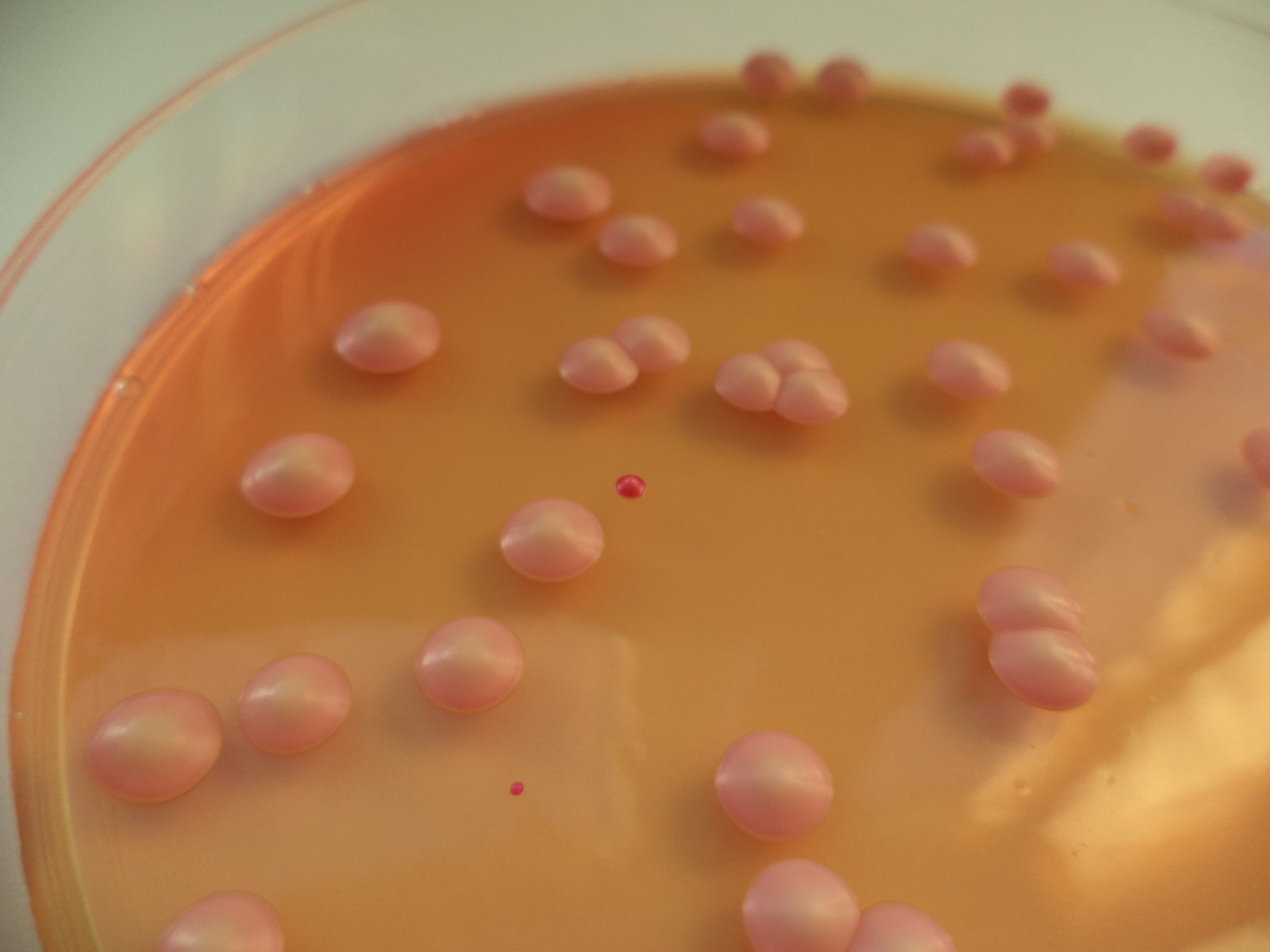
- Colonies of Brettanomyces bruxellensis on agar plate containing phloxine B

Scientific classification
- Kingdom: Fungi
- Division: Ascomycota
- Subdivision: Saccharomycotina
- Class: Pichiomycetes
- Order: Pichiales
- Family: Pichiaceae; Zender, 1925

Type genus
- Pichia Zender

Genera
- See text

= Pichiaceae =

Family of fungi

The Pichiaceae are a family of yeasts in the order Saccharomycetales. According to the 2007 Outline of Ascomycota, the family contains four genera, but GBIF lists 15 genera. The family was named by Zender in 1925.

The family is informally known as the methylotrophs clade for their ability to utilize methanol, conferred by a common insertion of the MOX1 (also known as AOX1) methanol oxidase gene.

== Genera ==
As listed by GBIF;

- Allodekkera (2)
- Brettanomyces N.H.Claussen ex Custers (5)
- Byrrha
- Dekkera Van der Walt (23)
- Enteroramus R.W.Lichtwardt, M.M.White, M.J.Cafaro & J.K.Misra, 1999
- Hansenula Syd. & P.Syd., 1919 (7)
- Issatchenkia Kudryavtsev (37)
- Komagataella Y.Yamada, M.Matsuda, K.Maeda & Mikata, 1995 (21)
- Kregervanrija Kurtzman (7)
- Martiniozyma Kurtzman, 2015 (5)
- Nakazawaea Y.Yamada, K.Maeda & Mikata (31)
- Phaffomyces Y.Yamada, 1997 (6)
- Pichia E.C.Hansen, 1904 (155)
- Saturnispora Z.Liu & Kurtzman (40)
- Willia Groenewege, 1920

Figures in brackets are approx. how many species per genus.
