= List of drugs: V–Ve =

This multi-page article lists pharmaceutical drugs alphabetically by name. Many drugs have more than one name and, therefore, the same drug may be listed more than once. Brand names and generic names are differentiated by capitalizing brand names.

See also the list of the top 100 bestselling branded drugs, ranked by sales.

Abbreviations are used in the list as follows:

- INN = International nonproprietary name
- BAN = British Approved Name
- USAN = United States Adopted Name
- Two-letter codes for countries

Lists of drugs
1–9 | A | B | C | D | E | F | G | H | I | J | K | L | M | N | O | P | Q | R | S | T | U | V | W | X | Y | Z

Va–Ve | Vf–Vz

== v ==
- V.V.S.
- V-Cillin
- V-Cillin K

== va ==
- vabicaserin (INN)
- Vablys
- Vabomere
- Vaborem
- Vabysmo
- Vacpertagen
- vadimezan (USAN, INN)
- vadocaine (INN)
- Vafseo
- Vagifem
- Vagilia
- Vagistat-1
- Vagigard
- Vagitrol
- valaciclovir (INN)
- valategrast (USAN, INN)
- valbenazine (INN)
- Valchlor
- valconazole (INN)
- Valcyte
- valdecoxib (INN)
- valdetamide (INN)
- valdipromide (INN)
- Valdoxan
- valganciclovir (INN)
- valine (INN)
- Valisone
- Valium
- Valmid
- Valnac
- valnemulin (INN)
- valnoctamide (INN)
- valoctocogene roxaparvovec (USAN, INN)
- valoctocogene roxaparvovec-rvox
- valofane (INN)
- valopicitabine (USAN, INN)
- Valorin
- valperinol (INN)
- Valpin 50
- valproate pivoxil (INN)
- valproate semisodium (INN)
- valproic acid (INN)
- valpromide (INN)
- Valrelease
- valrocemide (USAN)
- Valrubicin
- valsartan (INN)
- valspodar (INN)
- Valstar
- Valtaxin
- Valtoco
- valtorcitabine dihydrochloride (USAN)
- valtrate (INN)
- Valtrex
- Valturna
- vamicamide (INN)
- vamorolone (INN)
- Vanamide
- Vanatrip
- Vancenase
- Vancenase Aq
- Vanceril
- Vanceril Double Strength
- Vancocin
- Vancoled
- vancomycin (INN)
- Vancor
- Vandazole
- vandetanib (USAN)
- vaneprim (INN)
- Vanflyta
- vaniprevir (USAN, INN)
- Vaniqa
- vanitiolide (INN)
- Vanobid
- Vanos
- vanoxerine (INN)
- Vanrafia
- Vansil
- Vantas
- Vantavo
- Vanticon
- Vantin
- Vantobra
- Vantrela Er
- vanutide cridificar (USAN, INN)
- vanyldisulfamide (INN)
- vapaliximab (INN)
- vapiprost (INN)
- vapitadine (INN)
- Vapo-Iso
- Vaponefrin
- vapreotide (INN)
- Vaprisol
- vardenafil (INN)
- varenicline
- varenicline tartrate (USAN)
- varespladib (USAN)
- varfollitropin alfa (INN)
- Vargatef
- Varibar
- Varibar Honey
- Varibar Nectar
- Varibar Pudding
- Varibar Thin Honey
- Varibar Thin Liquid
- Varithena
- Varivax
- varlitinib (USAN, INN)
- Varubi
- Vascepa
- Vascor
- Vascoray
- Vaseretic
- Vasocidin
- Vasoclear
- Vasocon-A
- Vasocon
- Vasodilan
- vasopressin (INN)
- Vasostrict
- Vasotec
- Vasoxyl
- vatalanib (USAN)
- vatanidipine (INN)
- vatelizumab (INN)
- vatreptacog alfa (activated) (USAN)
- vatinoxan (USAN, INN)
- Vaxchora
- Vaxelis
- Vaxigrip
- Vaxneuvance
- Vaxzevria
- Vazalore
- Vazculep
- Vazkepa

== ve ==
- vebufloxacin (INN)
- Vectibix
- Vectical
- Vectrin
- vecuronium bromide (INN)
- vedaclidine (INN)
- vedaprofen (INN)
- vedolizumab (USAN, INN)
- Vedrop
- Veetids
- Veetids '125'
- Veetids '250'
- Veetids '500'
- Vegzelma
- Veinamine
- Veinamine 8%
- Veklury
- velafermin (USAN)
- velaglucerase alfa (USAN)
- velaresol (INN)
- Velban
- Velcade
- Veletri
- veliflapon (USAN)
- veligrotug (USAN, INN)
- veligrotug-vvze
- velimogene aliplasmid (USAN)
- veliparib (USAN, INN)
- Velivet
- Velmetia
- velnacrine (INN)
- velneperit (USAN, INN)
- Velosef
- Velosef '125'
- Velosef '250'
- Velosef '500'
- Velosulin
- Velphoro
- Velsipity
- Veltane
- Veltassa
- Veltin
- veltuzumab (USAN)
- velusetrag (USAN, INN)
- Vemlidy
- vemurafenib (INN)
- Venclexta
- Venclyxto
- venglustat (USAN, INN)
- venlafaxine (INN)
- Venofer
- venritidine (INN)
- Ventaire
- Ventavis
- Ventolin
- Ventolin Hfa
- Ventolin Rotacaps
- Veopoz
- Veoza
- Veozah
- vepalimomab (INN)
- vepdegestrant (USAN, INN)
- Vepesid
- Veppanu
- veradoline (INN)
- veralipride (INN)
- verapamil (INN)
- Veraring
- Veraseal
- verazide (INN)
- Vercyte
- Verdeso
- Verdye
- Veregen
- Verelan
- Verelan Pm
- Vergon
- Veriloid
- verilopam (INN)
- Verkazia
- verlukast (INN)
- Verluma
- Vermidol
- Vermizine
- Vermox
- vernakalant
- verofylline (INN)
- verpasep caltespen (USAN)
- Verquvo
- Versacloz
- Versapen
- Versapen-K
- Versed
- Versel
- versetamide (INN)
- Versiclear
- Vertavis
- verteporfin
- verubulin (USAN, INN)
- verucerfont (USAN, INN)
- Verzenio
- Verzenios
- Vesanoid
- vesencumab (INN)
- Vesicare
- Vesicare Ls
- vesnarinone (INN)
- Vesprin
- vestipitant mesylate (USAN)
- Vetmedin
- vetrabutine (INN)
- Vevye
- Vevzuo
- Vexol
- Veyvondi
