= List of drugs: Vf–Vz =

This multi-page article lists pharmaceutical drugs alphabetically by name. Many drugs have more than one name and, therefore, the same drug may be listed more than once. Brand names and generic names are differentiated by capitalizing brand names.

See also the list of the top 100 bestselling branded drugs, ranked by sales.

Abbreviations are used in the list as follows:

- INN = International nonproprietary name
- BAN = British Approved Name
- USAN = United States Adopted Name
- Two-letter codes for countries

Lists of drugs
1–9 | A | B | C | D | E | F | G | H | I | J | K | L | M | N | O | P | Q | R | S | T | U | V | W | X | Y | Z

Va–Ve | Vf–Vz

== vf ==
- Vfend

== vi ==
- Vi-Dom-A
- Vi-Twel
- Viadur
- Viagra
- Vibativ
- Viberzi
- Vibisone
- Vibra-tabs
- Vibramycin
- Vicks Formula 44
- Vicodin Es
- Vicodin Hp
- Vicodin
- Vicoprin
- Vicoprofen
- vicriviroc (USAN)
- Victoza
- Victrelis
- vidarabine (INN)
- Vidaza
- Videx
- Videx Ec
- vidofludimus (INN)
- Vidprevtyn Beta
- vidupiprant (INN)
- Viekira Pak (Copackaged)
- Viekira Xr
- Viekira
- Viekirax
- Vienva
- vigabatrin (INN)
- Vigadrone
- Vigafyde
- Vigamox
- Vigpoder
- Vihuma
- Viibryd
- Vijoice
- vilanterol (INN)
- vilazodone (USAN)
- vildagliptin (USAN)
- vilobelimab (USAN, INN)
- viloxazine (INN)
- Viltepso
- viminol (INN)
- Vimizim
- Vimovo
- Vimpat
- vinbarbital (INN)
- vinblastine (INN)
- vinburnine (INN)
- vincamine (INN)
- vincanol (INN)
- vincantril (INN)
- Vincasar Pfs
- Vincasar
- vincofos (INN)
- vinconate (INN)
- Vincrex
- vincristine (INN)
- vindeburnol (INN)
- vindesine (INN)
- vinepidine (INN)
- vinflunine ditartrate (USAN)
- vinflunine (INN)
- vinformide (INN)
- vinfosiltine (INN)
- vinglycinate (INN)
- vinleucinol (INN)
- vinleurosine (INN)
- vinmegallate (INN)
- vinorelbine (INN)
- vinpocetine (INN)
- vinpoline (INN)
- vinrosidine (INN)
- vintiamol (INN)
- vintoperol (INN)
- vintriptol (INN)
- vinylbital (INN)
- vinzolidine (INN)
- Viocin sulfate
- Viokace
- Viokase
- viomycin (INN)
- Viorele
- Vioxx
- vipadenant (USAN, INN)
- Vipdomet
- Vipidia
- viprostol (INN)
- viqualine (INN)
- viquidacin (USAN)
- viquidil (INN)
- Vira-A
- Virac Rex
- Viracept
- Viramune Xr
- Viramune
- Virazole
- Viread
- virginiamycin (INN)
- viridofulvin (INN)
- Virilon
- Viroptic
- viroxime (INN)
- Viscoat
- Visicol
- visilizumab (INN)
- Visine L.R.
- Visine
- Visionblue
- Visipaque 270
- Visipaque 320
- Visipaque
- Viskazide
- Visken
- Vislyfa
- vismodegib (USAN, INN)
- visnadine (INN)
- visnafylline (INN)
- Vistacot
- Vistaril
- vistatolon (INN)
- Vistide
- Vistogard
- Visudyne
- Vitamin A
- Vitamin D
- Vitamin K1
- Vitaneed
- Vitaped
- Vitec
- Vitekta
- Vitrakvi
- Vitrase
- Vitrasert
- Vitravene
- Vitrax
- Vitussin
- Vituz
- Vivacaine
- Vivactil
- Vivelle-Dot
- Vivelle
- Vivimusta
- Vivitrex
- Vivitrol
- Vivjoa
- Vivlodex
- Vizamyl
- Vizarsin
- Vizimpro

== vo ==
- Vocabria
- Voceryq
- voclosporin (USAN)
- Vogelxo
- voglibose (INN)
- Vokanamet
- volasertib (USAN, INN)
- volazocine (INN)
- Volibris
- volinanserin (USAN)
- Volmax
- Volnea
- volociximab (USAN, INN)
- Voltaren Arthritis Pain
- Voltaren Xr
- Voltaren
- Voltarol
- Voncento
- vonicog alfa (USAN, INN)
- Vonjo
- vonoprazan (INN)
- Vontrol
- Voquezna Dual Pak
- Voquezna Triple Pak
- Voquezna
- Voranigo
- vorapaxar (USAN, INN)
- vorasidenib (INN)
- Voraxaze
- voreloxin (USAN, INN)
- voretigene neparvovec (USAN, INN)
- voretigene neparvovec-rzyl
- voriconazole (INN)
- vorinostat (USAN)
- vorozole (INN)
- vortioxetine (USAN)
- vosaroxin (USAN)
- Vosevi
- Vosol Hc
- Vosol
- Vospire Er
- Vospire
- Votrient
- Votubia
- votucalis (USAN)
- votumumab (INN)
- Voveran
- Vowst
- voxergolide (INN)
- Voxzogo
- Voydeya
- Voyxact

== vp-vt ==
- Vpriv
- Vraylar
- Vtama

== vu-vy ==
- Vueway
- Vuity
- Vumerity
- Vumon
- Vusion
- vusolimogene oderparepvec (USAN, INN)
- vusolimogene oderparepvec-wtpg
- Vyalev
- Vybrique
- Vyduo
- Vydura
- Vyepti
- Vyfemla
- Vyjuvek
- Vykat Xr
- Vyleesi
- Vyleesi (Autoinjector)
- Vyloy
- Vyndamax
- Vyndaqel
- Vyondys 53
- Vytone
- Vytorin
- Vyvanse
- Vyvgart Hytrulo
- Vyvgart
- Vyxeos liposomal
- Vyxeos
- Vyzulta
