= C15H18N2O =

The molecular formula C_{15}H_{18}N_{2}O (molar mass: 242.32 g/mol) may refer to:

- Huperzine A
- Ro60-0213
- 6-Ethyl-9-oxaergoline
