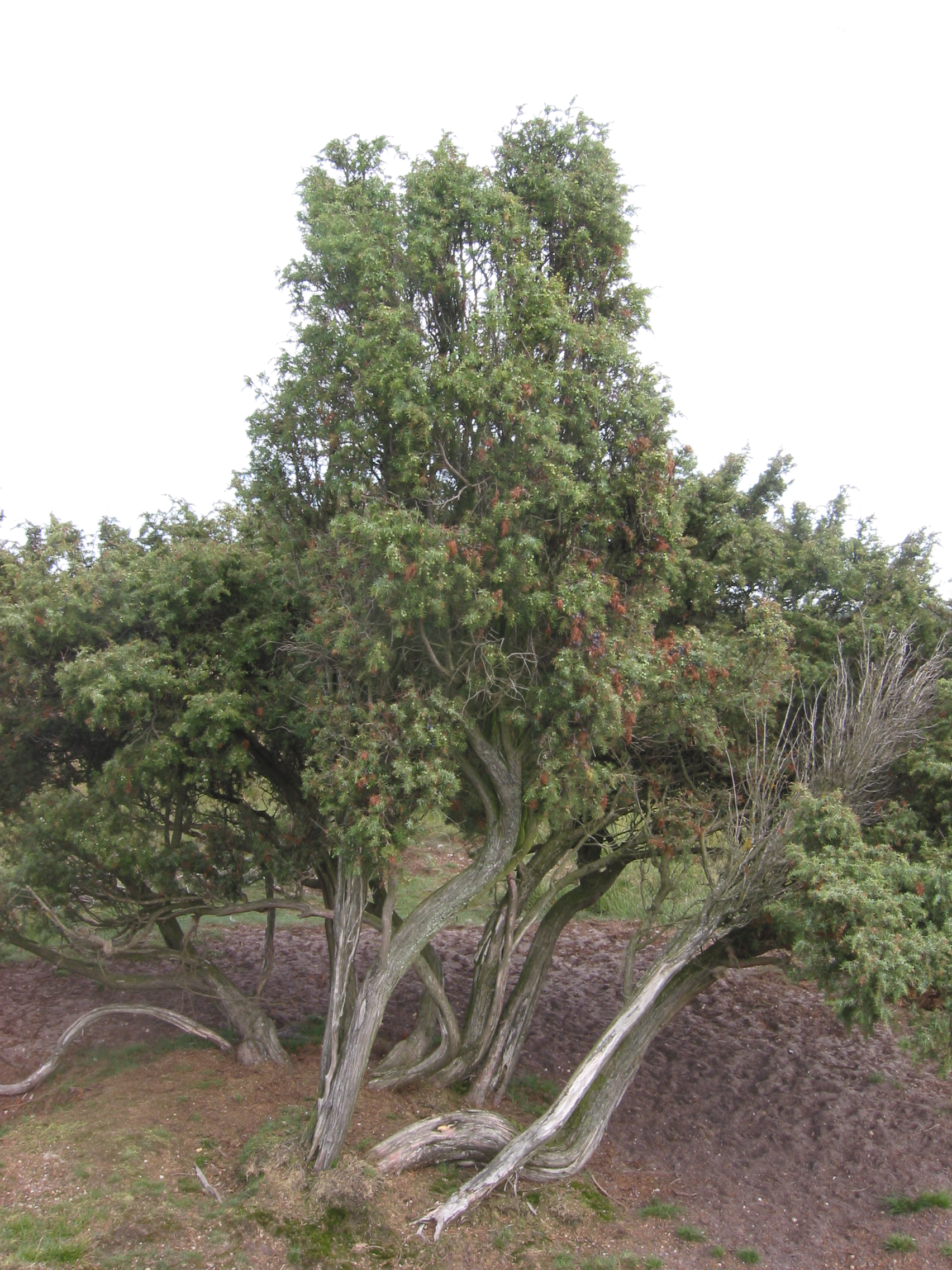
- Juniperus communis subsp. communis in the Netherlands

Conservation status
- Least Concern (IUCN 3.1)

- Secure (NatureServe)

Scientific classification
- Kingdom: Plantae
- Clade: Tracheophytes
- Clade: Gymnosperms
- Division: Pinophyta
- Class: Pinopsida
- Order: Cupressales
- Family: Cupressaceae
- Genus: Juniperus
- Section: Juniperus sect. Juniperus
- Subsection: Juniperus subsect. Juniperus
- Species: J. communis

Binomial name
- Juniperus communis L.
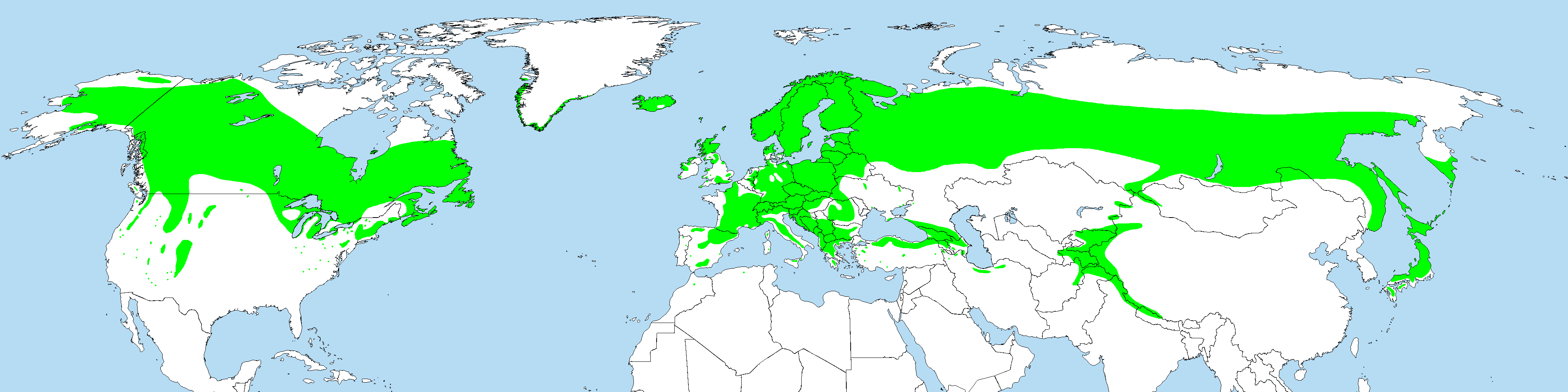
- Natural range worldwide
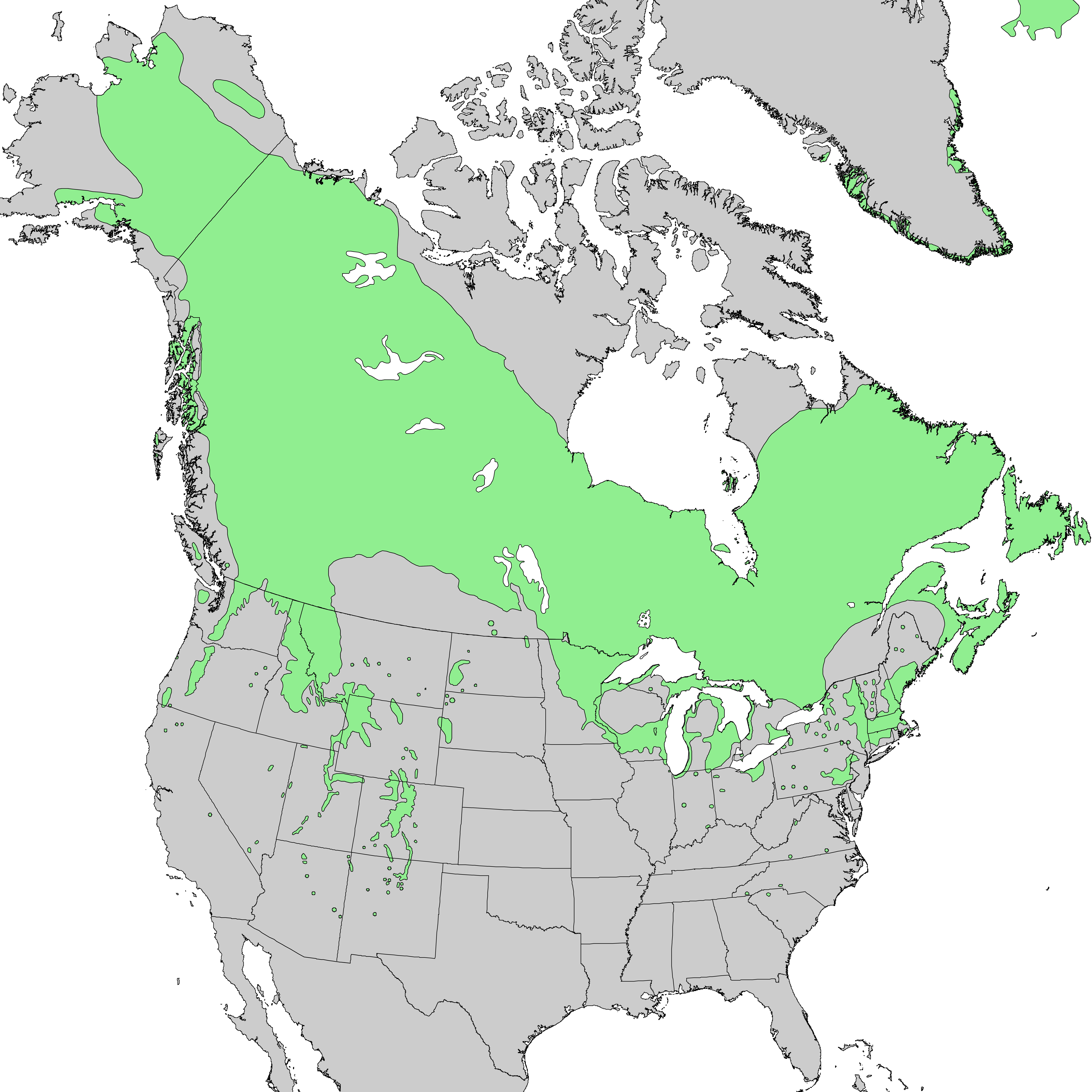
- Natural range in North America

= Juniperus communis =

Species of tree in the cypress family

Juniperus communis, the common juniper, is a species of small tree or shrub in the cypress family Cupressaceae. An evergreen conifer, it has the largest geographical range of any woody plant, with a Holarctic distribution throughout the cool temperate Northern Hemisphere.

== Description ==
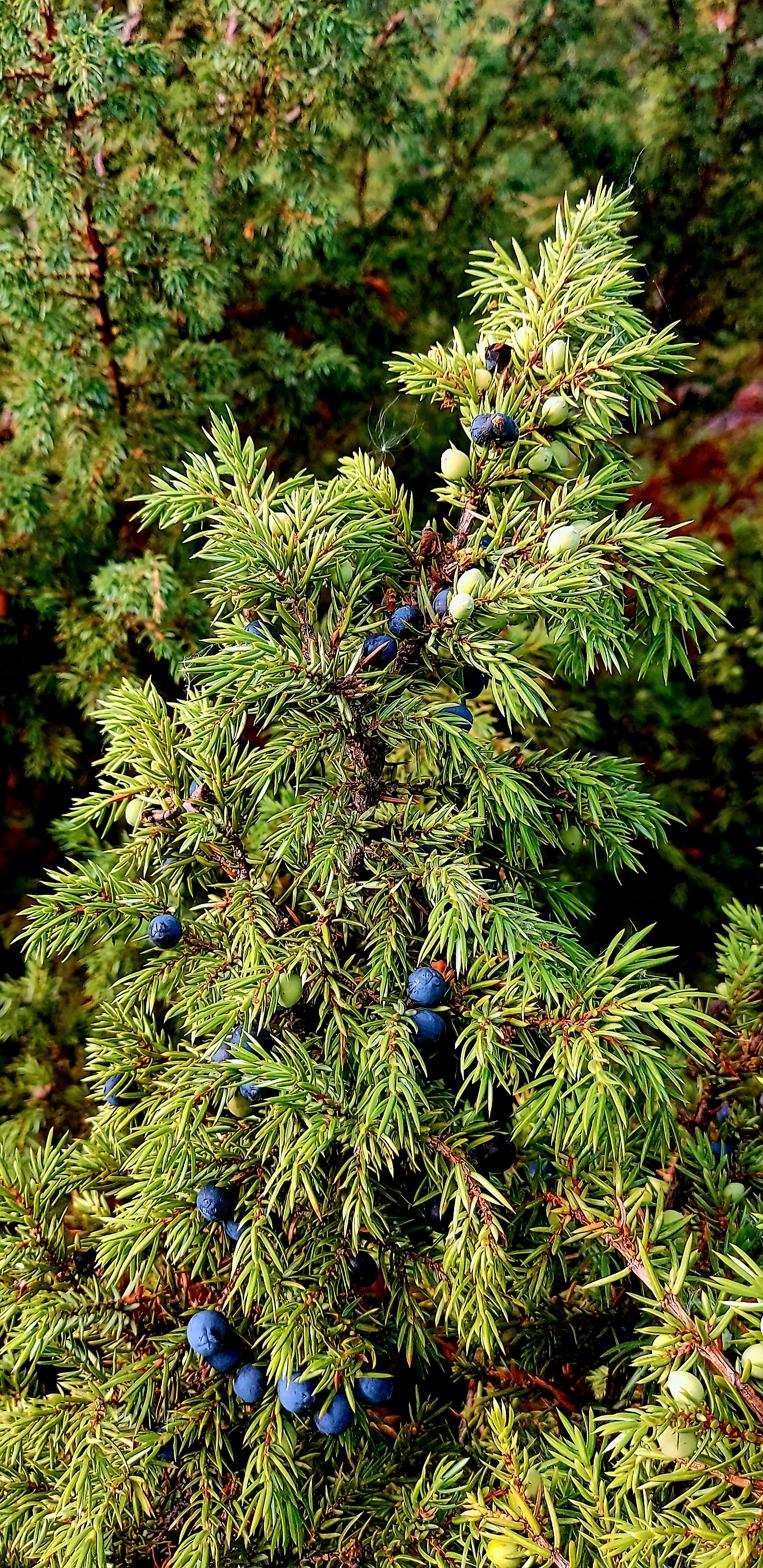
Common juniper, Arctic Norway

Juniperus communis is highly variable in form, ranging from 10 metres (33 feet)—rarely 16 m (52 ft)—tall to a low, often prostrate spreading shrub in exposed locations. It has needle-like leaves in whorls of three; the leaves are green, with a single white stomatal band on the inner surface. It never attains the scale-like adult foliage of other members of the genus. It is dioecious, with male and female cones on separate plants so requiring wind pollination to transfer pollen from male to female cones. Male trees or shrubs naturally live longer than female trees or shrubs; a male tree or shrub can live more than 2000 years.

The male cones are yellow, 2–3 millimetres (3/32–1/8 in) long, and fall soon after shedding their pollen in March–April. The fruit are berry-like cones known as juniper berries. They are initially green, ripening in 18 months to purple-black with a blue waxy coating; they are spherical, 4–12 mm (5/32–15/32 in) diameter, and usually have three (occasionally six) fleshy fused scales, each scale with a single seed. The seeds are dispersed when birds eat the cones, digesting the fleshy scales and passing the hard, unwinged seeds in their droppings.

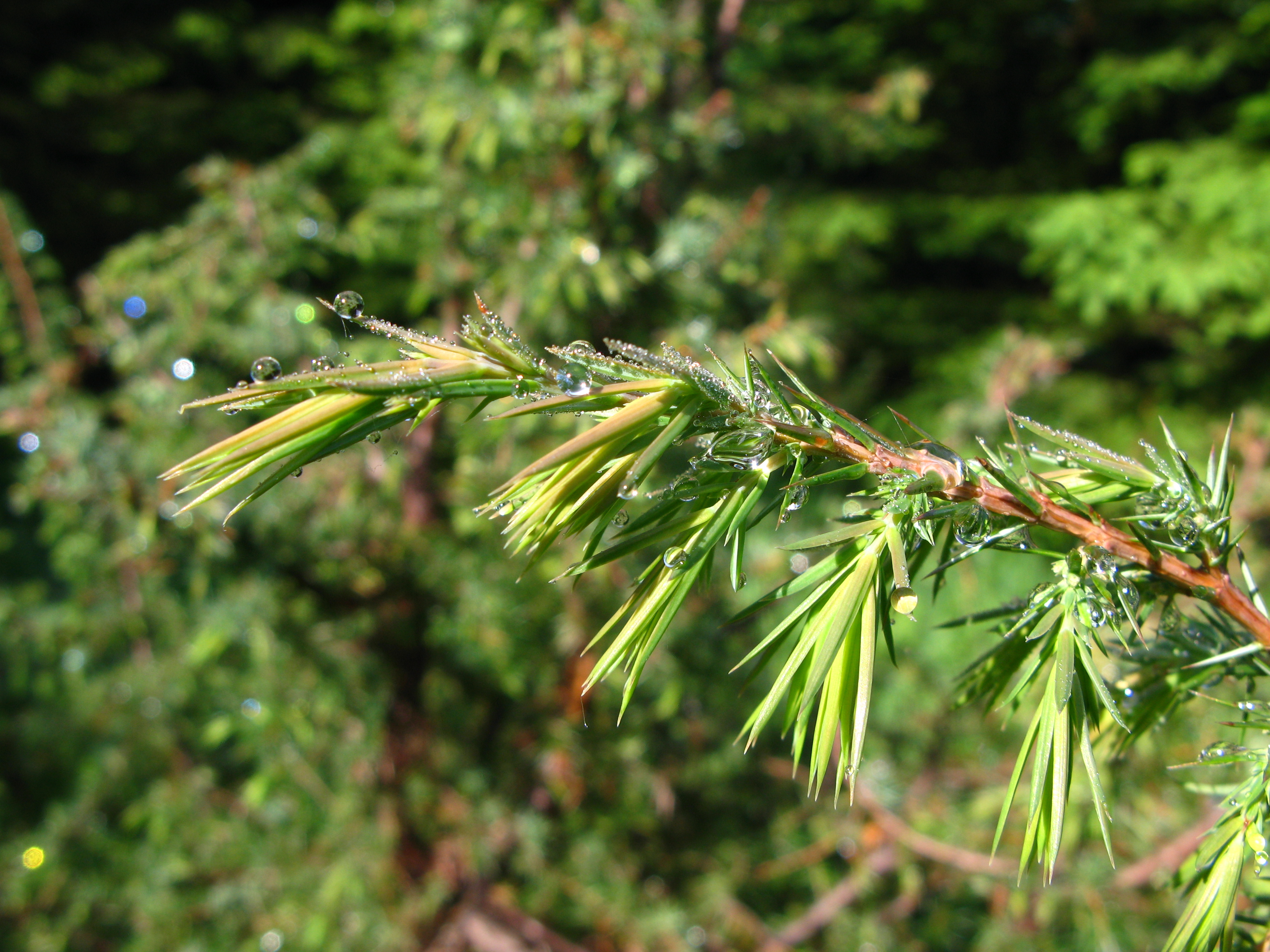
Young shoots, Malá Fatra

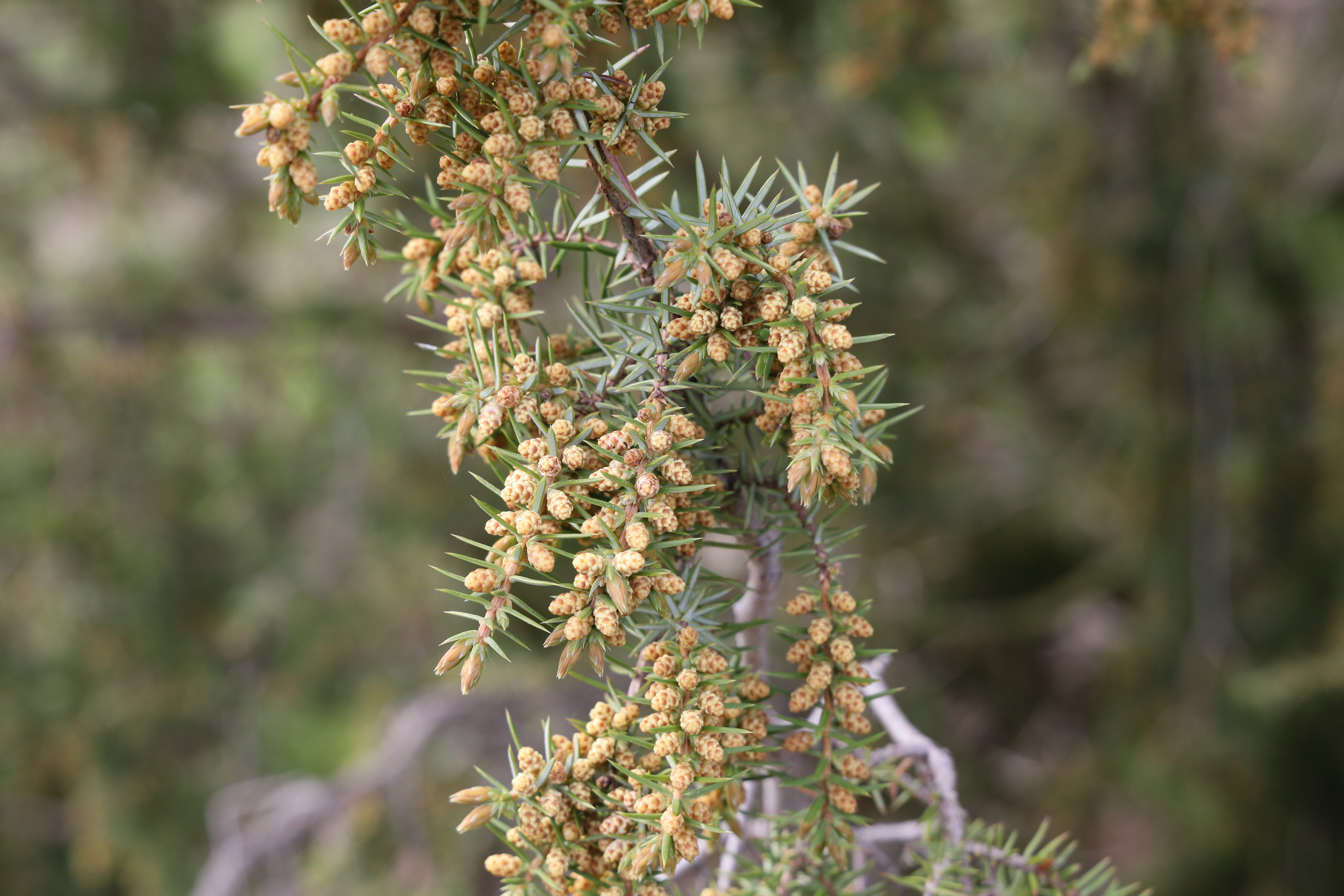
Male cones

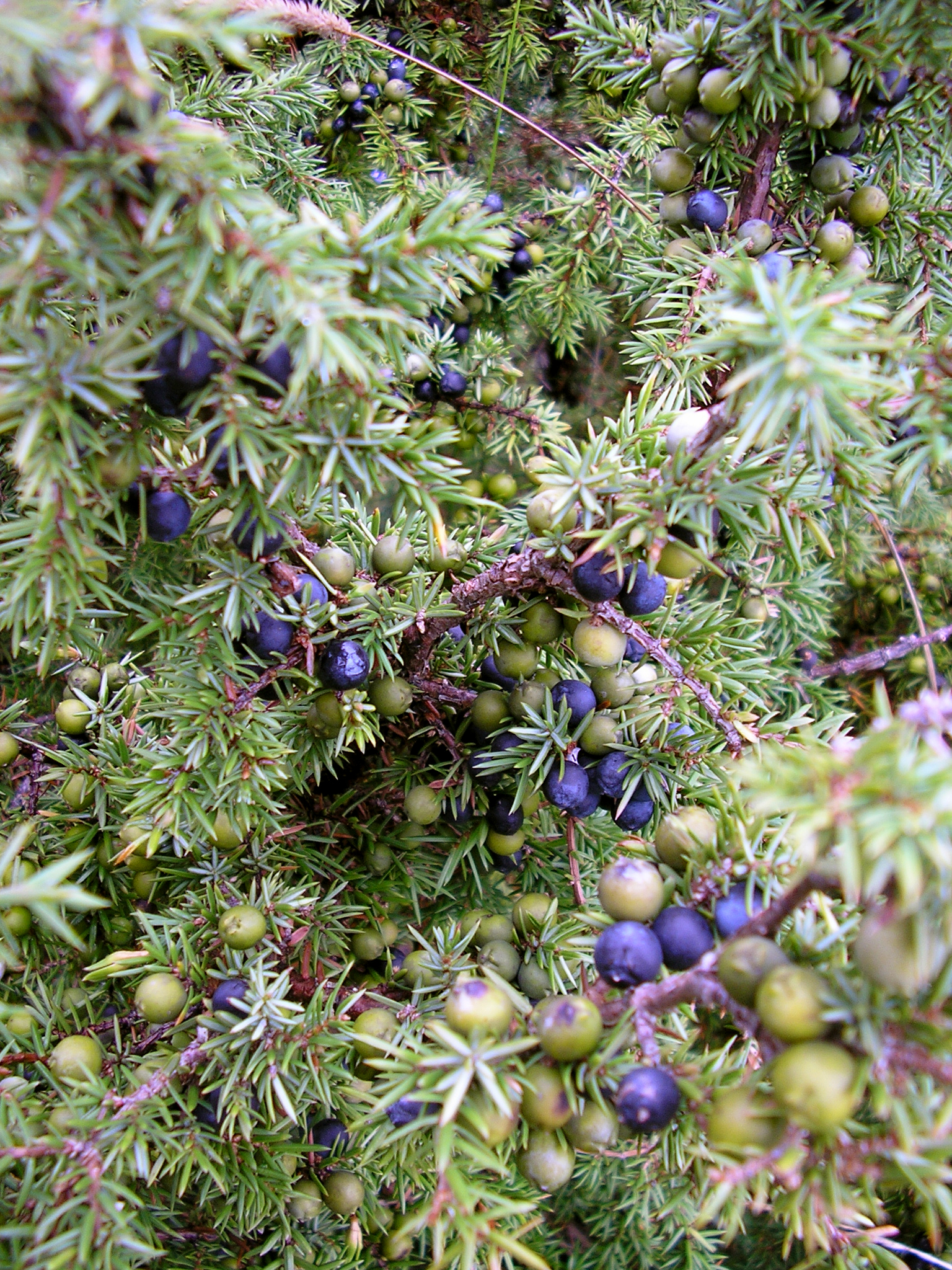
Ripe and unripe juniper berries in Saaremaa, Estonia

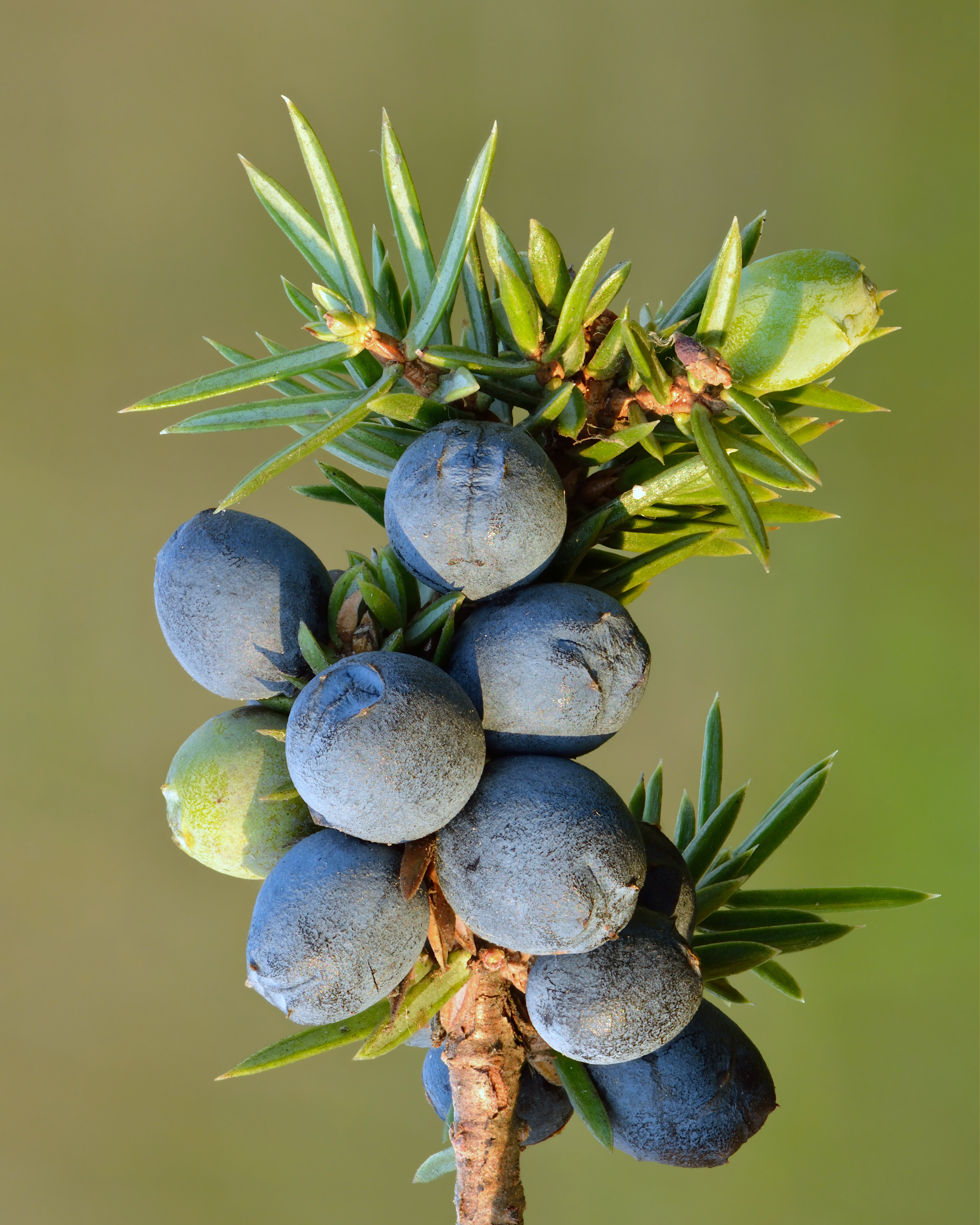
Close-up of foliage and cones

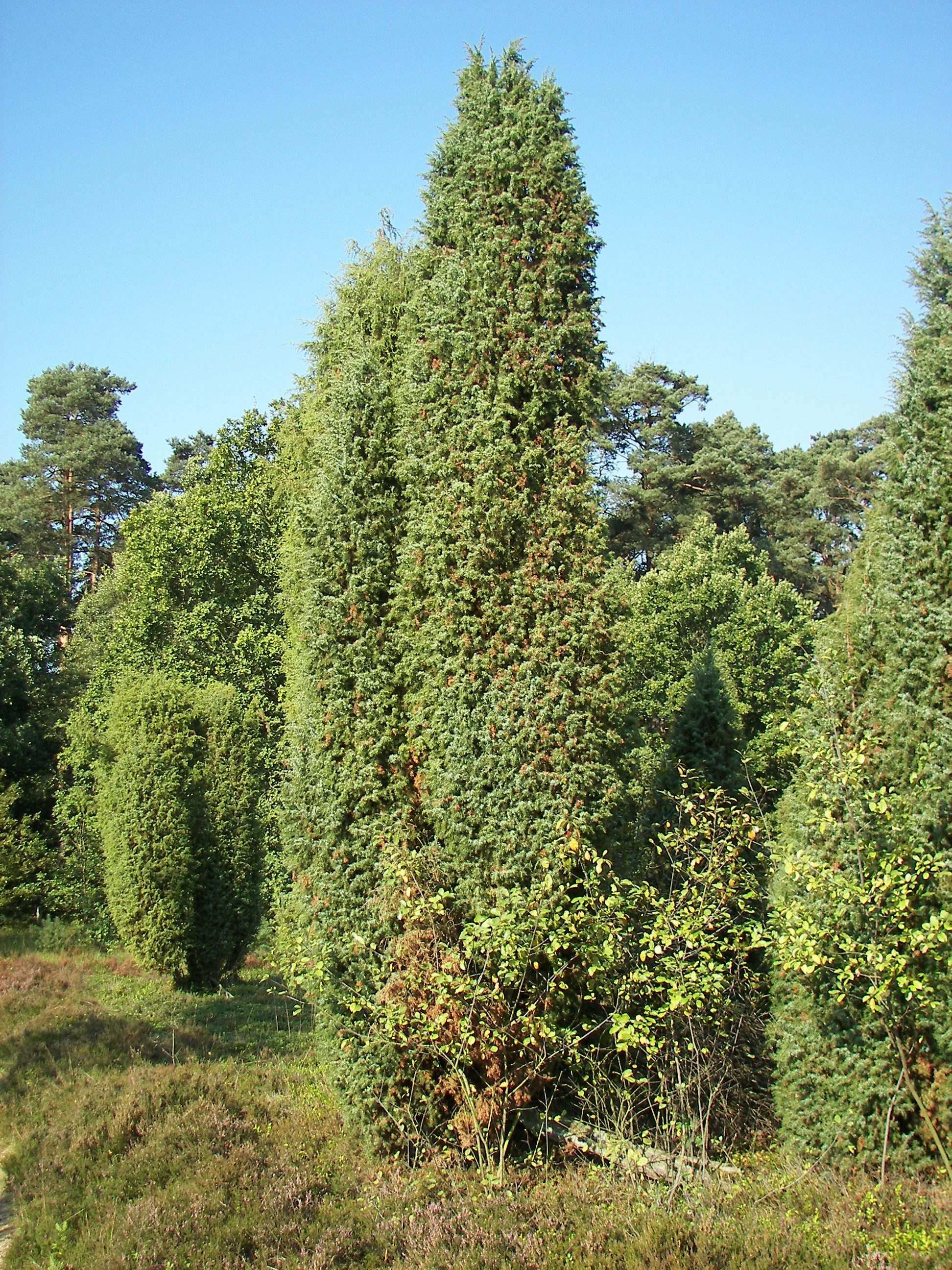
J. communis subsp. communis on Lüneburg Heath, Germany

=== Longevity ===
Dendrochronological studies made on shrubs from the tundra have found some particularly old specimens, which are among the oldest trees (or shrubs) ever recorded in Europe. They have found a 1647-year-old specimen in Finland (Lapland) within the Arctic Circle.

=== Chemistry ===
The juniper berry oil is composed largely of monoterpene hydrocarbons such as α-pinene, myrcene, sabinene, limonene and β-pinene.

== Subspecies ==
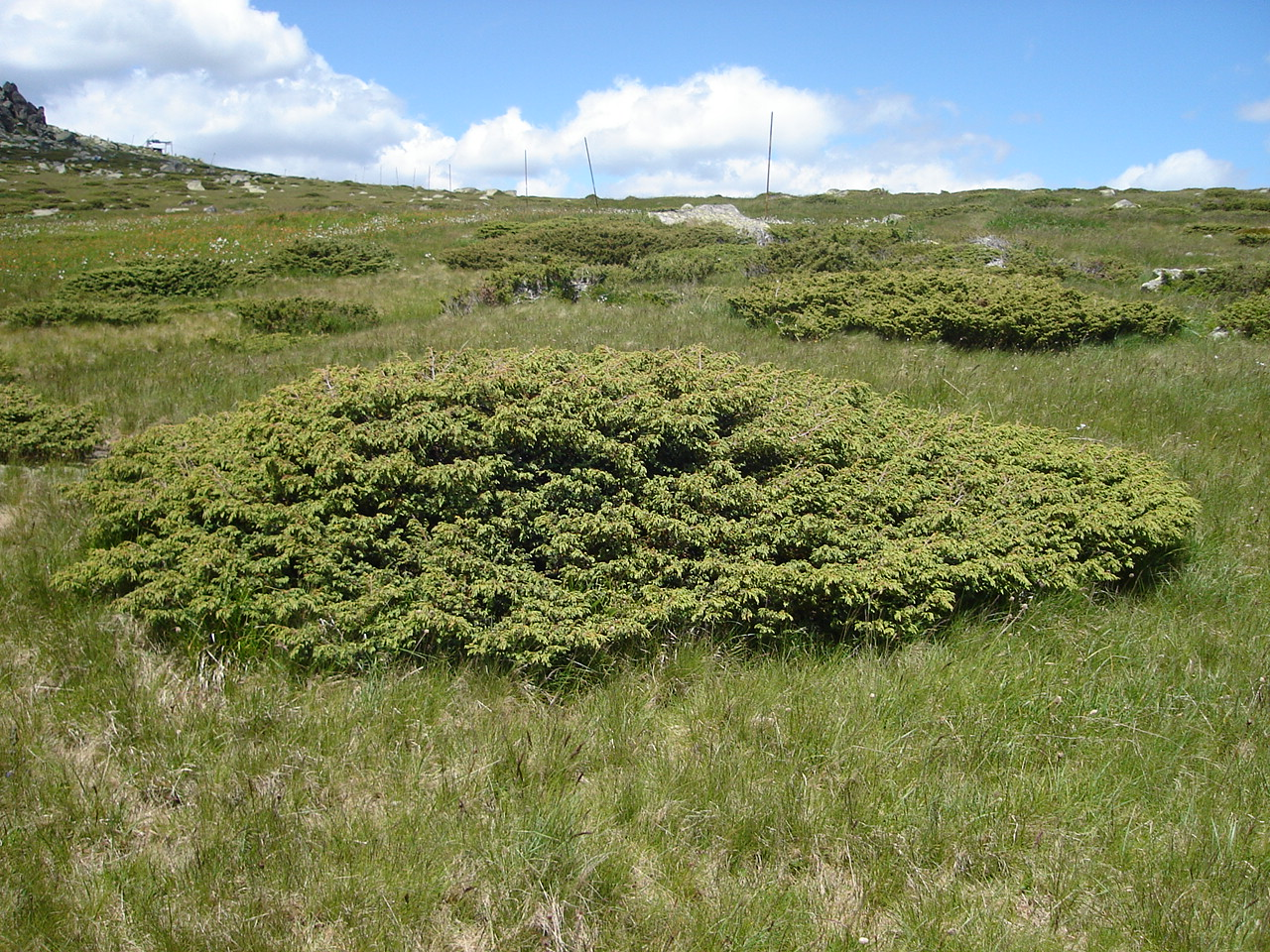
Prostrate specimens of J. communis subsp. alpina, in Vitosha, Bulgaria

As to be expected from its wide range, J. communis is highly variable, with several infraspecific taxa; delimitation between the taxa is still uncertain, with genetic data not matching morphological data well.

- subsp. communis – Common juniper. Usually an erect shrub or small tree; leaves 8–27 mm (5/16–1 1/16 in) long; cones small, 5–8 mm, usually shorter than the leaves; found at low to moderate elevation in temperate climates
  - subsp. communis var. communis – Europe, most of northern Asia
  - subsp. communis var. depressa Pursh – North America, Sierra Nevada in California
  - subsp. communis var. hemisphaerica (J.Presl & C.Presl) Parl. – Mediterranean mountains
  - subsp. communis var. nipponica (Maxim.) E.H.Wilson – Japan (status uncertain, often treated as J. rigida var. nipponica)
- subsp. alpina (Suter) Čelak. – alpine juniper (syn. J. c. subsp. nana, J. c. var. saxatilis Pallas, J. sibirica Burgsd.). Usually a prostrate ground-hugging shrub; leaves short, 3–8 mm; cones often larger, 7–12 mm, usually longer than the leaves; found in subarctic areas and high elevation alpine zones in temperate areas
  - subsp. alpina var. alpina – Greenland, Europe and Asia
  - subsp. alpina var. megistocarpa Fernald & H.St.John – Eastern Canada (doubtfully distinct from var. alpina)
  - subsp. alpina var. jackii Rehder – Western North America (doubtfully distinct from var. alpina)

Some botanists treat subsp. alpina at the lower rank of variety, in which case the correct name is J. communis var. saxatilis Pallas, though the name J. communis var. montana is also occasionally cited; others, primarily in eastern Europe and Russia, sometimes treat it as a distinct species J. sibirica Burgsd. (syn. J. nana Willd., J. alpina S.F.Gray).

== Distribution and habitat ==
The species has the largest geographical range of any woody plant, with a circumpolar distribution throughout the cool temperate Northern Hemisphere from the Arctic south in mountains to around 30°N latitude in North America, Europe and Asia. Relict populations can be found in the Atlas Mountains of Africa.

J. communis is one of Ireland's longest established plants.

== Cultivation ==
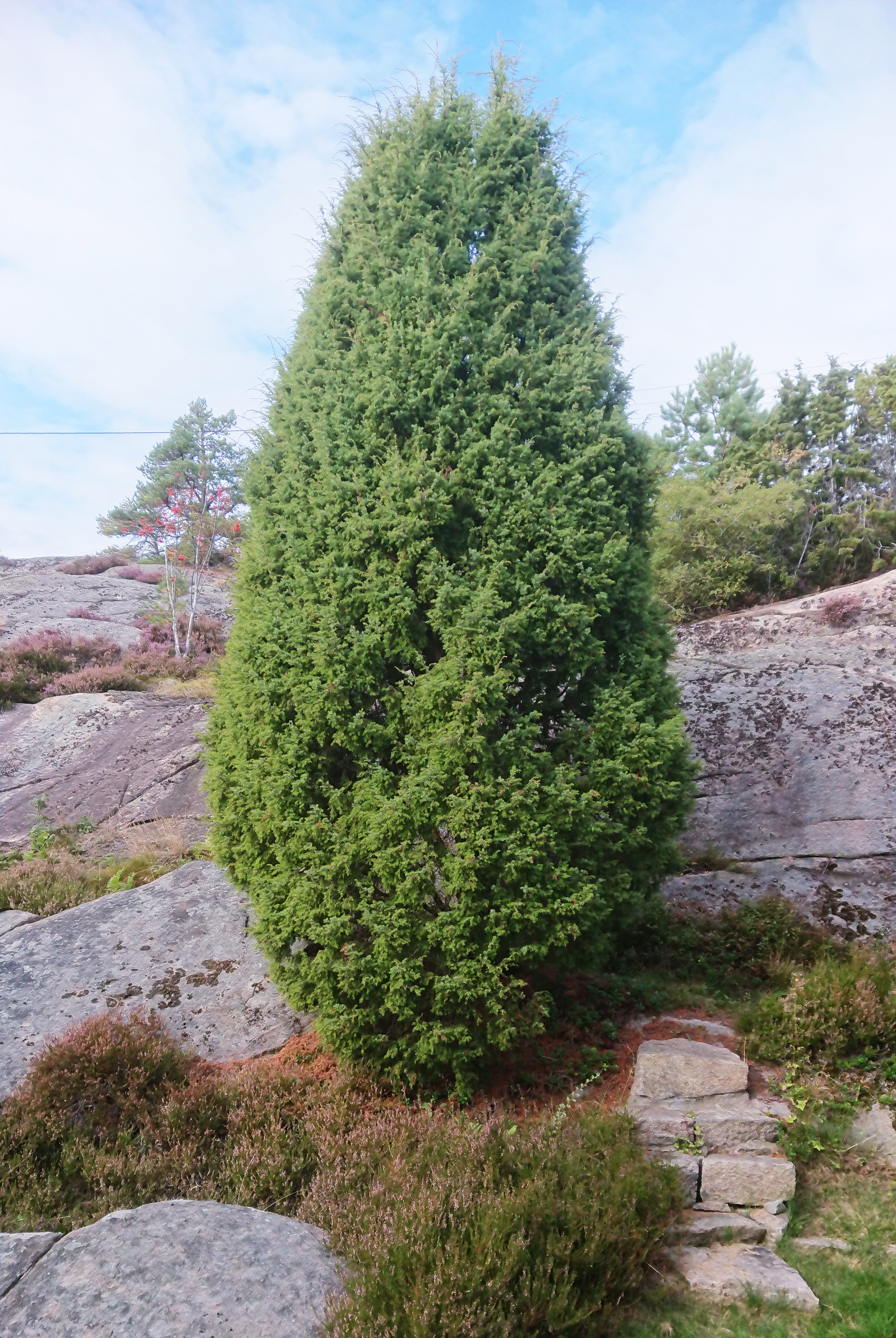
Teardrop-shaped J. communis in Hvaler, Norway

Juniperus communis is cultivated in the horticulture trade and used as an evergreen ornamental shrub in gardens. The following cultivars gained the Royal Horticultural Society's Award of Garden Merit in 1993:

- Juniperus communis 'Compressa'
- Juniperus communis 'Green Carpet' (prostrate shrub)
- Juniperus communis 'Hibernica' (Irish juniper)
- Juniperus communis 'Repanda' (prostrate shrub)

Other cultivars in use include:

- Juniperus communis 'Fontän'
- Juniperus communis 'Hornibrookii'
- Juniperus communis 'Kantarell'
- Juniperus communis 'Repanda'
- Juniperus communis 'Vemboö'

== Uses ==
=== Crafts ===
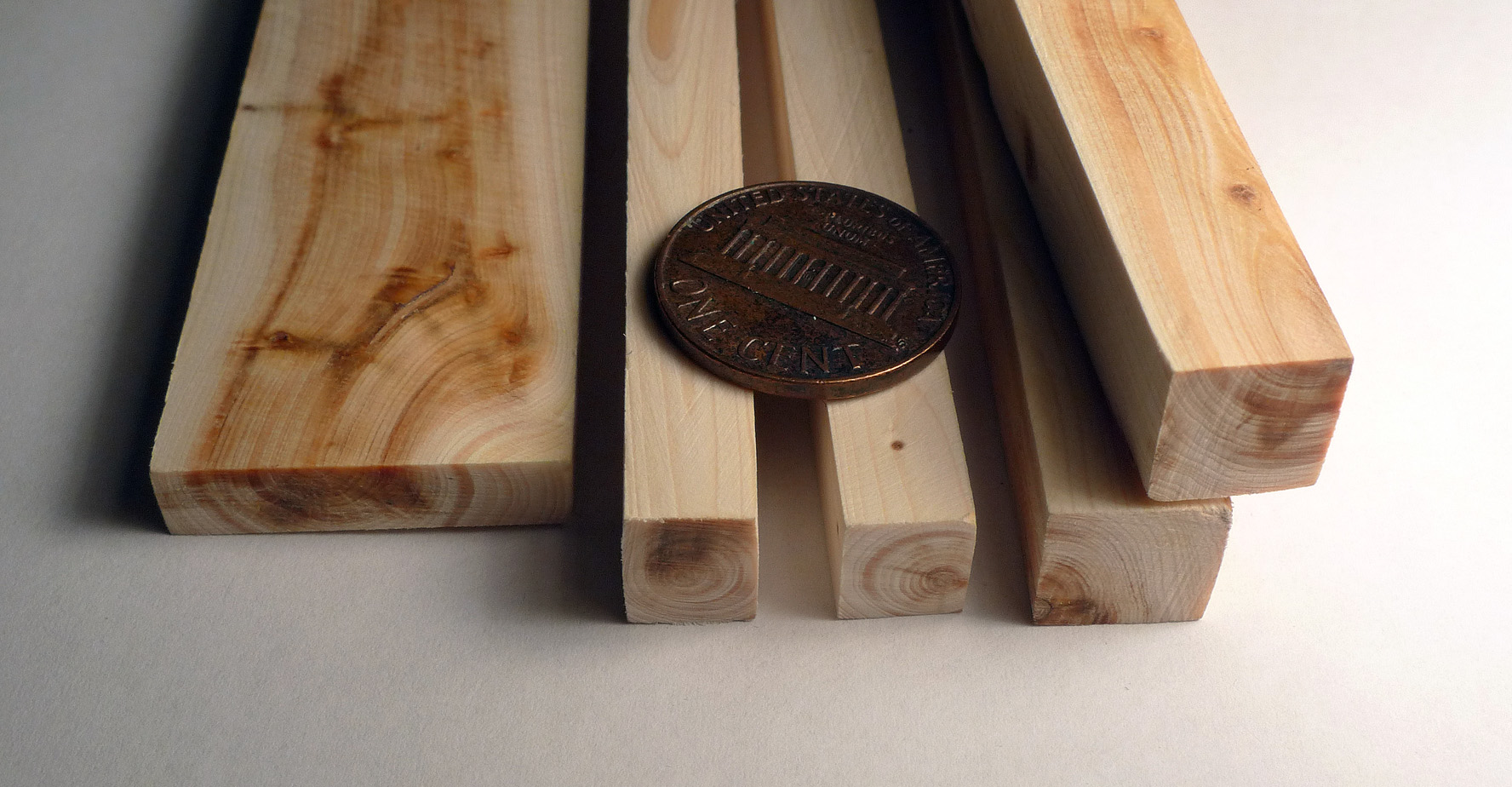
J. communis wood pieces, with a U.S. penny for scale, showing the narrow growth rings of the species

It is too small to have any general lumber usage. In Scandinavia, however, juniper wood is used for making containers for storing small quantities of dairy products such as butter and cheese, and also for making wooden butter knives. It was also frequently used for trenails in wooden shipbuilding by shipwrights for its tough properties.

In Estonia juniper wood is valued for its long lasting and pleasant aroma, very decorative natural structure of wood (growth rings) as well as good physical properties of wood due to slow growth rate of juniper and resulting dense and strong wood. Various decorative items (often eating utensils) are common in most Estonian handicraft shops and households.

According to the old tradition, on Easter Monday Kashubian (Northern Poland) boys chase girls whipping their legs gently with juniper twigs. This is to bring good fortune in love to the chased girls.

Juniper wood, especially burl wood, is frequently used to make knife handles for French pocketknives such as the Laguiole.

=== Culinary ===
Its astringent blue-black seed cones, commonly known as juniper berries, are too bitter to eat raw and are usually sold dried and used to flavour meats, sauces, and stuffings. They are generally crushed before use to release their flavour. Since juniper berries have a strong taste, they should be used sparingly. They are generally used to enhance meat with a strong flavour, such as game, including game birds, or tongue.

The cones are used to flavour certain beers and gin (the word "gin" derives from an Old French word meaning "juniper"). In Finland, juniper is used as a key ingredient in making sahti, a traditional Finnish ale. Also the Slovak alcoholic beverage Borovička and Dutch Jenever are flavoured with juniper berry or its extract.

Archaeological evidence suggests that the use of juniper in brewing may date back to at least the early medieval period. Juniper remains have been found at migration period and early Merovingian sites in southwestern Germany, indicating it may have been used to flavor beverages like beer as early as the 3rd to 6th centuries AD.

Juniper is used in the traditional farmhouse ales of Norway, Sweden, Finland, Estonia, and Latvia. In Norway, the beer is brewed with juniper infusion instead of water, while in the other countries the juniper twigs are mainly used as filters to prevent the crushed malts from clogging the outlet of the lauter tun. The use of juniper in farmhouse brewing has been common in much of northern Europe, seemingly for a very long time.

In Sweden its name is enbuske and it is used for making the traditional gin known as brännvin.

=== Traditional medicine ===
Juniper berries have long been used as medicine by many cultures including the Navajo people. Western American tribes combined the berries of J. communis with Berberis root bark in a herbal tea. Native Americans also used juniper berries as a female contraceptive.

=== Medicine ===
Juniper leaves were found to harbor fungi with potent anti-fungal compounds, including ibrexafungerp, which is now FDA approved to treat fungal infections.
