= Vatelizumab =

Monoclonal antibody
- Type: Whole antibody
- Source: Humanized
- Target: integrin alpha 2

Clinical data
- ATC code: none

Identifiers
- CAS Number: 1238217-55-4
- ChemSpider: none
- UNII: A4R7G50030

Vatelizumab is an immunomodulator. It binds to integrin alpha 2.

It was withdrawn from Phase II trials for inflammatory bowel disease due to a lack of efficacy.
