= Penicilloic acid =

Names
- Systematic IUPAC name (2R,4S)-2-[(R)-Carboxy(formamido)methyl]-5,5-dimethyl-1,3-thiazolidine-4-carboxylic acid
- Other names Penicilloic acid

Identifiers
CAS Number	64527-07-7
3D model (JSmol)	Interactive image
ChemSpider	393260
PubChem CID	52921568
UNII	3A8ULT6HAQ
CompTox Dashboard (EPA)	DTXSID60911623
- InChI: InChI=1S/C9H14N2O5S/c1-9(2)5(8(15)16)11-6(17-9)4(7(13)14)10-3-12/h3-6,11H,1-2H3,(H,10,12)(H,13,14)(H,15,16)/t4-,5-,6+/m0/s1 Key: OPEGYZAATHKDEM-HCWXCVPCSA-N
- SMILES: CC1([C@@H](N[C@H](S1)[C@@H](C(=O)O)NC=O)C(=O)O)C

Properties
Chemical formula	C_{9}H_{14}N_{2}O_{5}S
Molar mass	262.28 g·mol^{−1}
- Except where otherwise noted, data are given for materials in their standard state (at 25 °C [77 °F], 100 kPa). Infobox references

Penicilloic acid is any of several acids which are obtained from the penicillins by the hydrolytic opening of the lactam ring (as by the action of a beta-lactamase). Hypersensitivity is the most important adverse effect of the penicillins. The major antigenic determinant of penicillin hypersensitivity is its metabolite, penicilloic acid, which reacts with proteins and serves as a hapten to cause an immune reaction.

Approximately five percent of patients have some kind of reaction, ranging from maculopapular rash (the most common rash seen with ampicillin hypersensitivity) to angioedema (marked swelling of the lips, tongue, and periorbital area) and anaphylaxis. Among patients with mononucleosis who are treated with ampicillin, the incidence of maculopapular rash approaches 100 percent.

Cross-allergic reactions occur among the β-lactam antibiotics. To determine whether treatment with a β-lactam is safe when an allergy is noted, patient history regarding severity of previous reaction is essential.
