= 9-Oxaergoline =

Clinical data
- Other names: (6aR,10aR)-4,6a,7,8,9,10a-hexahydro-6H-indolo[3,4-gh][1,4]benzoxazine
- Drug class: Dopamine receptor agonist
- ATC code: None

Identifiers
- IUPAC name: (2R,7R)-3-oxa-6,11-diazatetracyclo[7.6.1.0^{2,7}.0^{12,16}]hexadeca-1(16),9,12,14-tetraene
- PubChem CID: 22813385
- ChemSpider: 18531393
- ChEMBL: ChEMBL121653

Chemical and physical data
- Formula: C_{13}H_{14}N_{2}O
- Molar mass: 214.268 g·mol^{−1}
- 3D model (JSmol): Interactive image
- SMILES: C1CO[C@H]2[C@H](N1)CC3=CNC4=CC=CC2=C34
- InChI: InChI=1S/C13H14N2O/c1-2-9-12-8(7-15-10(12)3-1)6-11-13(9)16-5-4-14-11/h1-3,7,11,13-15H,4-6H2/t11-,13-/m1/s1; Key:VHGCBDMLWAGBAP-DGCLKSJQSA-N

9-Oxaergoline is a low-potency dopamine receptor agonist related to the ergolines. It is the analogue and bioisostere of ergoline in which the carbon atom at the 9 position of the ergoline ring system has been replaced with an oxygen atom. A few notable derivatives of 9-oxaergoline have been studied and characterized, including RU-29717 (N-propyl-9-oxaergoline), 6-ethyl-9-oxaergoline (EOE), and voxergolide (RU-41656), which are all substantially more potent as dopamine receptor agonists than 9-oxaergoline itself. Other derivatives, such as N-methyl-9-oxaergoline, have been characterized as well. In addition to its dopaminergic activity, RU-29717 is notable in also having affinity for serotonin receptors and in producing a short-lasting head-twitch response in rodents. The head-twitch response is notable in being a behavioral proxy of psychedelic effects caused by serotonin 5-HT_{2A} receptor agonism. The potential serotonergic activities of 9-oxaergoline and N-methyl-9-oxaergoline do not appear to have been reported.

== See also ==
- Substituted ergoline
- Naxagolide
