= ATC code J02 =

ATC code J02 Antimycotics for systemic use is a therapeutic subgroup of the Anatomical Therapeutic Chemical Classification System, a system of alphanumeric codes developed by the World Health Organization (WHO) for the classification of drugs and other medical products. Subgroup J02 is part of the anatomical group J Antiinfectives for systemic use.

Codes for veterinary use (ATCvet codes) can be created by placing the letter Q in front of the human ATC code: for example, QJ02. ATCvet codes without corresponding human ATC codes are cited with the leading Q in the following list.
National versions of the ATC classification may include additional codes not present in this list, which follows the WHO version.

== J02A Antimycotics for systemic use ==
=== J02AA Antibiotics ===
J02AA01 Amphotericin B
J02AA02 Hachimycin

=== J02AB Imidazole derivatives ===
J02AB01 Miconazole
J02AB02 Ketoconazole
QJ02AB90 Clotrimazole

=== J02AC Triazole and tetrazole derivatives ===
J02AC01 Fluconazole
J02AC02 Itraconazole
J02AC03 Voriconazole
J02AC04 Posaconazole
J02AC05 Isavuconazole
J02AC06 Oteseconazole

=== J02AX Other antimycotics for systemic use ===
J02AX01 Flucytosine
J02AX04 Caspofungin
J02AX05 Micafungin
J02AX06 Anidulafungin
J02AX07 Ibrexafungerp
J02AX08 Rezafungin acetate
