= RU-29717 =

Clinical data
- Other names: RU29717; RU-29,717; N-Propyl-9-oxaergoline; 6-Propyl-9-oxaergoline; POE
- Drug class: Dopamine receptor agonist; Serotonin receptor modulator
- ATC code: None

Identifiers
- IUPAC name: (7R)-6-propyl-3-oxa-6,11-diazatetracyclo[7.6.1.0^{2,7}.0^{12,16}]hexadeca-1(16),9,12,14-tetraene
- CAS Number: 85351-27-5
- PubChem CID: 134984
- ChemSpider: 118948

Chemical and physical data
- Formula: C_{16}H_{20}N_{2}O
- Molar mass: 256.349 g·mol^{−1}
- 3D model (JSmol): Interactive image
- SMILES: CCCN1CCOC2[C@H]1CC3=CNC4=CC=CC2=C34
- InChI: InChI=1S/C16H20N2O/c1-2-6-18-7-8-19-16-12-4-3-5-13-15(12)11(10-17-13)9-14(16)18/h3-5,10,14,16-17H,2,6-9H2,1H3/t14-,16?/m1/s1; Key:QZLSEITWUMZHSJ-IURRXHLWSA-N

RU-29717, also known as N-propyl-9-oxaergoline or as 6-propyl-9-oxaergoline (POE), is a dopamine receptor agonist and serotonin receptor modulator of the 9-oxaergoline family closely related to ergolines such as pergolide.

It produces effects including suppression of prolactin secretion, hypotension, emesis, stereotypy, and antiparkinsonian-like effects in animals. In addition to its dopamine receptor agonism, RU-29717 shows affinity for serotonin receptors (e.g., 5-HT_{1} and 5-HT_{2} receptors), with much higher affinity for the serotonin 5-HT_{1} receptors than the related dopamine receptor agonist pergolide, though RU-29717's affinity for serotonin 5-HT_{2} receptors is much lower than for serotonin 5-HT_{1} receptors. Relatedly, RU-29717 also caused short-lasting head twitches in rodents, which were hypothesized to be due to serotonin receptor agonism. The head-twitch response is notable in being a behavioral proxy of psychedelic effects caused by serotonin 5-HT_{2A} receptor agonism.

RU-29717 was described in the scientific literature in 1983 and was patented in 1985.

== See also ==
- Substituted 9-oxaergoline
- 6-Ethyl-9-oxaergoline (EOE)
- Voxergolide (RU-41656)
- Descarboxylysergic acid
- Pergolide
