= Voxergolide =

Clinical data
- Other names: RU41656; 6-Methyl-8-[(methylthio)methyl]-9-oxaergoline
- Drug class: Dopamine D_{2} receptor agonist

Identifiers
- IUPAC name: (2R,4R,7R)-6-methyl-4-(methylsulfanylmethyl)-3-oxa-6,11-diazatetracyclo[7.6.1.02,7.012,16]hexadeca-1(16),9,12,14-tetraene
- CAS Number: 89651-00-3
- PubChem CID: 3086301
- ChemSpider: 2342959
- UNII: PP012U645Q
- CompTox Dashboard (EPA): DTXSID90869027

Chemical and physical data
- Formula: C_{16}H_{20}N_{2}OS
- Molar mass: 288.41 g·mol^{−1}
- 3D model (JSmol): Interactive image
- SMILES: CN1C[C@@H](O[C@H]2[C@H]1CC3=CNC4=CC=CC2=C34)CSC
- InChI: InChI=1S/C16H20N2OS/c1-18-8-11(9-20-2)19-16-12-4-3-5-13-15(12)10(7-17-13)6-14(16)18/h3-5,7,11,14,16-17H,6,8-9H2,1-2H3/t11-,14-,16-/m1/s1; Key:GYUHVILBXXBZDS-DJSGYFEHSA-N

Voxergolide (INN; developmental code name RU-41656), also known as 6-methyl-8-[(methylthio)methyl]-9-oxaergoline, is a dopamine receptor agonist of the 9-oxaergoline family described as an anti-anoxic and anti-ischemic agent which was never marketed. It acts specifically as a dopamine D_{2} receptor agonist.

== See also ==
- Substituted 9-oxaergoline
- RU-29717 (N-propyl-9-oxaergoline)
- 6-Ethyl-9-oxaergoline (EOE)
- Naxagolide
