= Daunorubicin/cytarabine =

Pharmaceutical drug

- Cytarabine

- Daunorubicin

Combination of
- Daunorubicin: Anthracycline
- Cytarabine: Antimetabolite

Clinical data
- Trade names: Vyxeos
- Other names: CPX-351
- AHFS/Drugs.com: Monograph
- License data: US DailyMed: Vyxeos
- Pregnancy category: AU: D
- Routes of administration: Intravenous
- ATC code: L01XY01 (WHO)

Legal status
- Legal status: AU: S4 (Prescription only); CA: ℞-only; US: ℞-only; EU: Rx-only

Identifiers
- CAS Number: 1256639-86-7
- KEGG: D11390

Daunorubicin/cytarabine, sold under the brand name Vyxeos, is a fixed-dose combination medication used for the treatment of acute myeloid leukemia. It contains the liposomal bound daunorubicin, an anthracycline topoisomerase inhibitor, and cytarabine, a nucleoside metabolic inhibitor.

== Medical uses ==
Daunorubicin/cytarabine is indicated for the treatment of newly-diagnosed therapy-related acute myeloid leukemia (t-AML) or AML with myelodysplasia-related changes (AML-MRC) in people aged one year of age and older.
