= Hetacillin =

Chemical compound

Clinical data
- Trade names: Hetacin, Versapen
- AHFS/Drugs.com: Veterinary Use
- Routes of administration: Intramammary injection
- ATC code: J01CA18 (WHO)

Legal status
- Legal status: US: ℞-only

Identifiers
- IUPAC name: (2S,5R,6R)-6-[(4R)-2,2-dimethyl-5-oxo-4-phenylimidazolidin-1-yl]-3,3-dimethyl-7-oxo-4-thia-1-azabicyclo[3.2.0]heptane-2-carboxylic acid
- CAS Number: 3511-16-8
- PubChem CID: 443387
- DrugBank: DB00739
- ChemSpider: 391616
- UNII: TN4JSC48CV
- KEGG: D01074
- ChEMBL: ChEMBL1201116
- CompTox Dashboard (EPA): DTXSID4023121
- ECHA InfoCard: 100.020.466

Chemical and physical data
- Formula: C_{19}H_{23}N_{3}O_{4}S
- Molar mass: 389.47 g·mol^{−1}
- 3D model (JSmol): Interactive image
- SMILES: CC1([C@@H](N2[C@H](S1)[C@@H](C2=O)N3C(=O)[C@H](NC3(C)C)c4ccccc4)C(=O)O)C
- InChI: InChI=1S/C19H23N3O4S/c1-18(2)13(17(25)26)21-15(24)12(16(21)27-18)22-14(23)11(20-19(22,3)4)10-8-6-5-7-9-10/h5-9,11-13,16,20H,1-4H3,(H,25,26)/t11-,12-,13+,16-/m1/s1; Key:DXVUYOAEDJXBPY-NFFDBFGFSA-N

Hetacillin is a beta-lactam antibiotic that is part of the aminopenicillin family. It is a prodrug and has no antibacterial activity itself, but quickly splits off acetone in the human body to form ampicillin, which is active against a variety of bacteria.

== Administration ==
Hetacillin can be administered orally. The potassium salt, hetacillin potassium, is administered by injection, either intravenously or intramuscularly. It is sold under the trade name Hetacin for intramammary injection in veterinary use.

Hetacillin was withdrawn from the market for human use when the discovery was made that it had no advantages over ampicillin.

== Chemistry ==
Hetacillin is prepared from ampicillin and acetone. In aqueous solutions it is unstable, with a half life of 15 to 30 minutes at 37 °C (99 °F) and pH 7, quickly releasing acetone again.
