= Acetic acid/hydrocortisone =

Pharmaceutical drug

Combination of
- Acetic acid: Antibacterial, antifungal
- Hydrocortisone: Anti-inflammatory

Clinical data
- Trade names: Acetasol HC
- AHFS/Drugs.com: Multum Consumer Information
- Pregnancy category: N
- Routes of administration: Ear drops
- ATC code: S02CA03 (WHO)

Legal status
- Legal status: US: ℞-only

Identifiers
- CAS Number: none

Acetic acid/hydrocortisone is a commonly used combination drug to treat infections of the outer ear and ear canal. Branded as Vosol HC and Acetasol HC, it combines the antibacterial and antifungal action of acetic acid with the anti-inflammatory functions of hydrocortisone.
