= 6-Ethyl-9-oxaergoline =

Clinical data
- Other names: EOE; 6-EOE; N-Ethyl-9-oxaergoline
- Drug class: Dopamine receptor agonist; Adrenergic receptor modulator; Serotonin receptor modulator
- ATC code: None

Identifiers
- IUPAC name: (7R)-6-ethyl-3-oxa-6,11-diazatetracyclo[7.6.1.0^{2,7}.0^{12,16}]hexadeca-1(16),9,12,14-tetraene
- CAS Number: 81244-91-9
- PubChem CID: 133635
- ChemSpider: 117879
- CompTox Dashboard (EPA): DTXSID701001868

Chemical and physical data
- Formula: C_{15}H_{18}N_{2}O
- Molar mass: 242.322 g·mol^{−1}
- 3D model (JSmol): Interactive image
- SMILES: CCN1CCOC2[C@H]1CC3=CNC4=CC=CC2=C34
- InChI: InChI=1S/C15H18N2O/c1-2-17-6-7-18-15-11-4-3-5-12-14(11)10(9-16-12)8-13(15)17/h3-5,9,13,15-16H,2,6-8H2,1H3/t13-,15?/m1/s1; Key:ILMWHLYQRWFIJV-AFYYWNPRSA-N

6-Ethyl-9-oxaergoline (EOE), also known as N-ethyl-9-oxaergoline, is a dopamine receptor agonist of the 9-oxaergoline family. It is a potent dopamine receptor agonist and produces effects in animals including antiparkinsonian-like effects, stereotypy, hypothermia, hypolocomotion at lower doses and hyperlocomotion at higher doses, and emesis. In addition to its dopaminergic activity, EOE shows agonist and antagonist activities at the α_{2}-adrenergic receptor. It shows weaker affinity for the serotonin 5-HT_{1} and 5-HT_{2} receptors as well. EOE was first described in the scientific literature in 1982.

== See also ==
- Substituted 9-oxaergoline
- RU-29717 (N-propyl-9-oxaergoline; POE)
- Voxergolide (RU-41656)
