= Volociximab =

Monoclonal antibody

Monoclonal antibody
- Type: Whole antibody
- Source: Chimeric (mouse/human)
- Target: α5β1 integrin

Clinical data
- ATC code: none

Identifiers
- CAS Number: 558480-40-3
- ChemSpider: none
- UNII: 496K5Z02NW
- KEGG: D06319

Chemical and physical data
- Formula: C_{6434}H_{9942}N_{1706}O_{2040}S_{52}
- Molar mass: 145501.33 g·mol^{−1}

Volociximab (also known as M200) is a chimeric monoclonal antibody jointly developed by PDL BioPharma and Biogen Idec for treatment of a variety of advanced solid tumors. It binds to and inhibits the functional activity of α5β1 integrin.

It is thought to reduce metastases. Early results show potential in renal cell cancers.
