= Vapaliximab =

Monoclonal antibody

Monoclonal antibody
- Type: Whole antibody
- Source: Chimeric (mouse/human)
- Target: VAP-1

Clinical data
- ATC code: none

Identifiers
- CAS Number: 336801-86-6
- ChemSpider: none
- UNII: M1EGR25LBB

Vapaliximab is a chimeric monoclonal antibody and an experimental immunosuppressive drug. Development was discontinued by 2012.
