= Hydrocodone/aspirin =

Combination opioid analgesic and NSAID

Combination of
- Hydrocodone: Opioid analgesic
- Aspirin: NSAID

Clinical data
- Trade names: Azdone, Lortab ASA, Damason-P, Panasal
- Routes of administration: Oral

Legal status
- Legal status: US: Schedule II; In general: ℞ (Prescription only)

Hydrocodone/aspirin (INNs) is an oral combination drug formulation of the semi-synthetic opioid analgesic hydrocodone bitartrate and the salicylate nonsteroidal anti-inflammatory drug (NSAID) aspirin (acetylsalicylic acid) used in the treatment of pain. It is indicated for the management of moderate to moderately severe pain. The combination relies on multimodal analgesia, integrating the central antinociceptive properties of opioids with the peripheral anti-inflammatory and antiplatelet effects of salicylates to achieve synergistic pain relief.

Historically marketed under brand names such as Lortab ASA, Damason-P, and Azdone, the use of this combination has declined significantly in contemporary medical practice. This reduction is attributed to safety concerns regarding aspirin toxicity—specifically gastrointestinal bleeding and Reye's syndrome—and strict regulatory changes. In 2014, the United States Drug Enforcement Administration (DEA) rescheduled all hydrocodone combination products from Schedule III to the more restrictive Schedule II to curb the opioid epidemic.

== Medical uses ==
Hydrocodone/aspirin is FDA-approved for the relief of moderate to moderately severe pain. It is generally reserved for patients requiring opioid-level analgesia for whom alternative treatment options (such as non-opioid analgesics or opioid combinations with lower toxicity profiles) are inadequate or not tolerated.

=== Dosage and administration ===
The most common historical formulation contained 5 mg of hydrocodone bitartrate and 500 mg of aspirin per tablet. Dosing is strictly limited by the toxicity of the aspirin component. The maximum daily dosage is generally capped at eight tablets to prevent exceeding 4,000 mg of aspirin, which carries a high risk of salicylism (toxicity) and severe gastric mucosal injury.

The medication is typically administered with food or a full glass of water to minimize gastric irritation.

=== Specific populations ===
Pediatrics: The combination is contraindicated in children and teenagers due to the association between aspirin use during viral illnesses (such as influenza or varicella) and the development of Reye's syndrome, a rare but life-threatening encephalopathy.

Pregnancy: It is classified as Pregnancy Category D. It is contraindicated in the third trimester because aspirin can cause premature closure of the fetal ductus arteriosus and increase the risk of hemorrhage during delivery.

Geriatrics: Elderly patients require cautious dosing due to increased susceptibility to opioid-induced sedation and aspirin-induced gastrointestinal bleeding.

== Adverse effects ==
The safety profile of hydrocodone/aspirin is dominated by the specific risks associated with the aspirin component, which renders the combination unsuitable for many patients compared to acetaminophen-based opioids.

Gastrointestinal: Aspirin causes direct mucosal injury and inhibits cytoprotective prostaglandins, leading to a high risk of peptic ulcer disease, gastric perforation, and gastrointestinal hemorrhage. This risk is exacerbated by concurrent alcohol consumption.

Hematologic: Aspirin irreversibly inhibits platelet COX-1, disabling platelet aggregation for the lifespan of the platelet (7–10 days). This significantly increases bleeding time and poses risks for patients with coagulopathies or those undergoing surgery.

Respiratory: Hydrocodone causes dose-dependent respiratory depression. Additionally, aspirin can precipitate bronchospasm in sensitive individuals, particularly those with the "Samter's Triad" of asthma, nasal polyps, and aspirin sensitivity.

Central Nervous System: Common opioid side effects include drowsiness, dizziness, lightheadedness, and sedation.

== Overdose ==
Overdose with hydrocodone/aspirin presents a complex "mixed" toxidrome that poses unique diagnostic and treatment challenges. The concurrent presence of an opioid agonist and a salicylate creates opposing physiological forces.

Opioid toxicity: Hydrocodone causes central nervous system depression, miosis (pinpoint pupils), and respiratory depression (bradypnea).

Salicylate toxicity: Aspirin toxicity normally causes hyperventilation (tachypnea) to compensate for metabolic acidosis.

Mixed presentation: In a combined overdose, the opioid-induced respiratory depression may suppress the compensatory hyperventilation required to manage salicylate-induced metabolic acidosis. This leads to rapid and profound acidemia (drop in blood pH). Acidemia facilitates the entry of salicylate into the central nervous system, exacerbating neurotoxicity and increasing the risk of cerebral edema and death.

Management requires addressing both toxidromes simultaneously. Naloxone is used to reverse opioid-induced respiratory depression, while sodium bicarbonate is administered to alkalinize the urine and promote the excretion of salicylates ("ion trapping").

== Interactions ==
The dual active ingredients necessitate vigilance regarding a broad spectrum of drug interactions.

Anticoagulants: Concurrent use with warfarin or heparin significantly increases bleeding risk due to aspirin's antiplatelet activity and displacement of warfarin from plasma proteins.

CNS Depressants: Co-administration with benzodiazepines, sedatives, or alcohol results in additive respiratory depression and is associated with fatal overdose.

Methotrexate: Salicylates inhibit the renal secretion of methotrexate, potentially leading to toxic levels and bone marrow suppression.

ACE Inhibitors: Aspirin may blunt the antihypertensive effects of ACE inhibitors and diuretics, posing a risk of acute renal failure in volume-depleted patients.

== Pharmacology ==
=== Mechanism of action ===
The efficacy of the combination is derived from the complementary activity of its constituents:

Hydrocodone is a semi-synthetic full agonist at the mu-opioid receptor in the central nervous system. Activation of these receptors inhibits the release of excitatory neurotransmitters (e.g., Substance P, glutamate) and alters the emotional perception of pain.

Aspirin acts peripherally by irreversibly inhibiting cyclooxygenase (COX) enzymes. This inhibition blocks the synthesis of prostaglandins that sensitize nociceptors and mediate inflammation.

=== Pharmacokinetics ===
Absorption: Both agents are rapidly absorbed. Hydrocodone reaches peak serum concentrations in approximately 1.3 to 1.7 hours.

Metabolism: Hydrocodone is metabolized in the liver via CYP2D6 (to hydromorphone) and CYP3A4 (to norhydrocodone). Genetic variability in CYP2D6 can affect analgesic efficacy and toxicity. Aspirin is rapidly hydrolyzed to salicylic acid, which is then conjugated in the liver. Salicylate elimination follows saturation kinetics; at toxic doses, the half-life can extend from 2–3 hours to 15–30 hours.

Excretion: Both drugs and their metabolites are excreted primarily through the kidneys.

== Society and culture ==
=== Regulation ===
Historically, hydrocodone combination products were classified as Schedule III controlled substances in the United States. On October 6, 2014, the DEA rescheduled all hydrocodone combination products to Schedule II. This decision, driven by high rates of abuse and diversion, eliminated automatic refills and imposed stricter prescribing requirements. Following this change, the total volume of hydrocodone prescriptions declined significantly.

=== Brand names ===
Discontinued or legacy brand names for hydrocodone/aspirin formulations include:

Lortab ASA

Damason-P

Azdone

Panasal

Due to the unfavorable safety profile of aspirin compared to acetaminophen or ibuprofen, most branded versions have been discontinued, though generic formulations may technically remain listed in regulatory databases.

== See also ==
Hydrocodone/paracetamol

Hydrocodone/ibuprofen

Oxycodone/aspirin

Opioid epidemic
