= Vinconate =

Chemical compound

Clinical data
- ATC code: none

Identifiers
- IUPAC name: methyl (3aS)-3-ethyl-2,3,3a,4-tetrahydro-1H-indolo[3,2,1-"de]-1,5-maphthyridine-6-carboxylate
- CAS Number: 70704-03-9
- PubChem CID: 68896
- ChemSpider: 62125
- UNII: 807MP0MJ61
- CompTox Dashboard (EPA): DTXSID40867937
- ECHA InfoCard: 100.067.969

Chemical and physical data
- Formula: C_{18}H_{20}N_{2}O_{2}
- Molar mass: 296.370 g·mol^{−1}
- 3D model (JSmol): Interactive image
- SMILES: O=C(OC)C/1=C/CC3c2n\1c4ccccc4c2CCN3CC
- InChI: InChI=1S/C18H20N2O2/c1-3-19-11-10-13-12-6-4-5-7-14(12)20-16(18(21)22-2)9-8-15(19)17(13)20/h4-7,9,15H,3,8,10-11H2,1-2H3; Key:JWOSSISWAJNJIA-UHFFFAOYSA-N

Vinconate is a synthetic vincamine analog used as a nootropic.

Vinconate, even when systemically administered, enhances the endogenous release of dopamine in the striatum, probably via the stimulation of presynaptic muscarinic receptors.

== Synthesis ==
Synthesis: Patent:
