= Vepalimomab =

Mouse monoclonal antibody

Monoclonal antibody
- Type: Whole antibody
- Source: Mouse
- Target: VAP-1

Clinical data
- ATC code: none

Identifiers
- CAS Number: 195158-85-1
- ChemSpider: none
- UNII: 0M19J59UH4

Vepalimomab is an experimental mouse monoclonal antibody intended for the treatment of inflammations. It blocks vascular adhesion protein 1. Development of the drug was discontinued in 2002.
