= Valperinol =

Chemical compound

Clinical data
- ATC code: None

Legal status
- Legal status: In general: non-regulated

Identifiers
- IUPAC name: (1R,3R,4S,6R,7S,8R,10R)-8-methoxy-10-methyl-3-(1-piperidinylmethyl)-2,9-dioxatricyclo[4.3.1.0^{3,7}]decan-4-ol
- CAS Number: 64860-67-9
- PubChem CID: 68849
- ChemSpider: 62082
- UNII: 580OD29R6M
- CompTox Dashboard (EPA): DTXSID501024325

Chemical and physical data
- Formula: C_{16}H_{27}NO_{4}
- Molar mass: 297.395 g·mol^{−1}
- 3D model (JSmol): Interactive image
- SMILES: O1[C@@H](OC)[C@@H]2[C@@]3(O[C@H]1[C@@H]([C@H]2C[C@@H]3O)C)CN4CCCCC4
- InChI: InChI=1S/C16H27NO4/c1-10-11-8-12(18)16(9-17-6-4-3-5-7-17)13(11)15(19-2)20-14(10)21-16/h10-15,18H,3-9H2,1-2H3/t10-,11-,12+,13-,14+,15-,16-/m1/s1; Key:KZSHXABWNBVUTK-GBIHRFPISA-N

Valperinol (INN; GA 30-905) is a drug which acts as a calcium channel blocker. It was patented as a possible sedative, antiepileptic, and/or antiparkinsonian agent, but was never marketed.
