= Valopicitabine =

Chemical compound

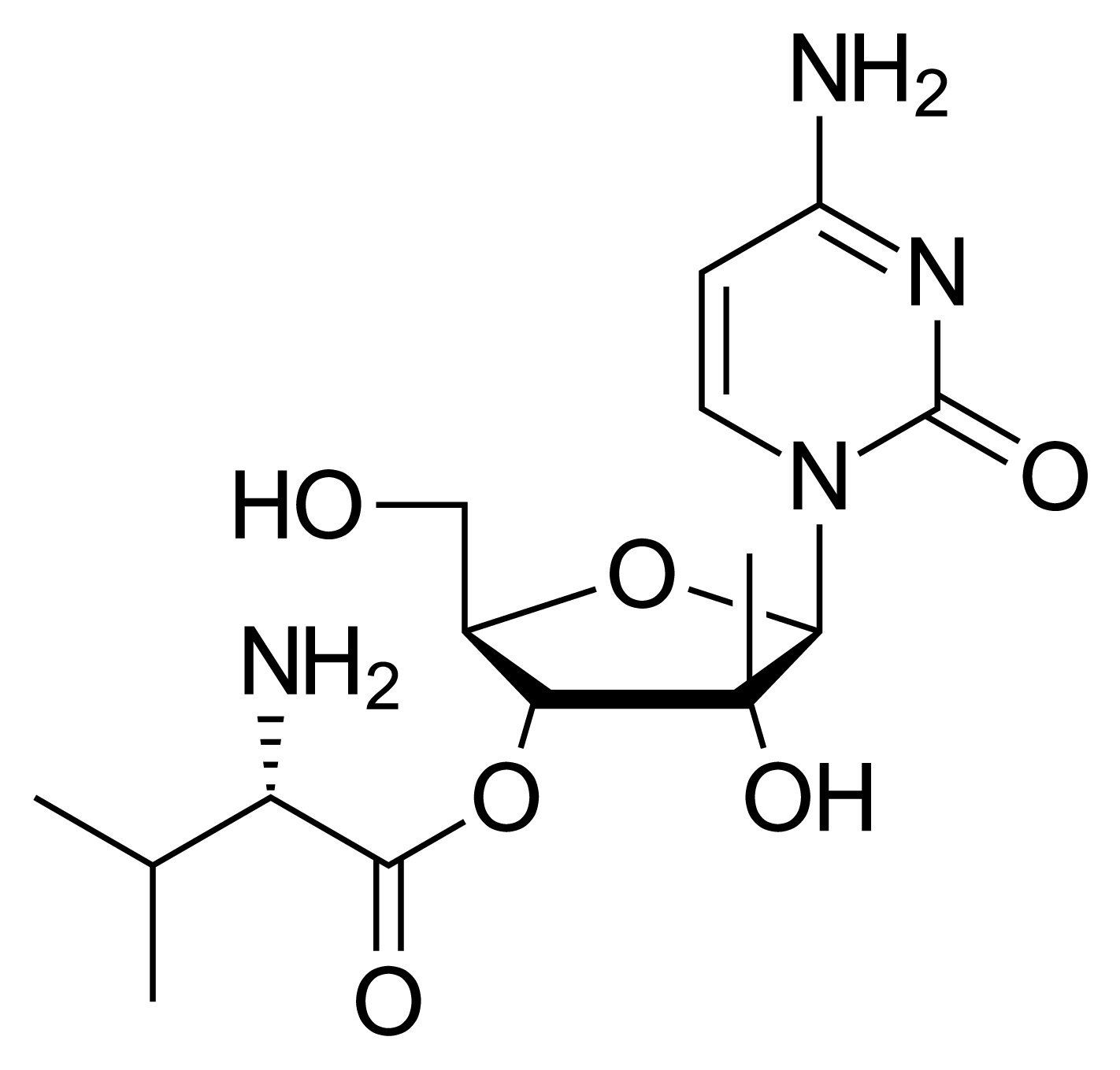

Clinical data
- ATC code: None

Legal status
- Legal status: US: Investigational drug

Identifiers
- IUPAC name: [(2R,3R,4R,5R)-5-(4-amino-2-oxopyrimidin-1-yl)-4-hydroxy-2-(hydroxymethyl)-4-methyloxolan-3-yl] (2S)-2-amino-3-methylbutanoate
- CAS Number: 640281-90-9
- PubChem CID: 6918726
- DrugBank: DB13920
- ChemSpider: 5293918
- UNII: I2T0B5G94M
- KEGG: D09028
- ChEMBL: ChEMBL1743757
- CompTox Dashboard (EPA): DTXSID70214011

Chemical and physical data
- Formula: C_{15}H_{24}N_{4}O_{6}
- Molar mass: 356.379 g·mol^{−1}
- 3D model (JSmol): Interactive image
- SMILES: CC(C)[C@@H](C(=O)O[C@@H]1[C@H](O[C@H]([C@]1(C)O)N2C=CC(=NC2=O)N)CO)N
- InChI: InChI=1S/C15H24N4O6/c1-7(2)10(17)12(21)25-11-8(6-20)24-13(15(11,3)23)19-5-4-9(16)18-14(19)22/h4-5,7-8,10-11,13,20,23H,6,17H2,1-3H3,(H2,16,18,22)/t8-,10+,11-,13-,15-/m1/s1; Key:TVRCRTJYMVTEFS-ICGCPXGVSA-N

Valopicitabine (NM-283) is an antiviral drug which was developed as a treatment for hepatitis C, though only progressed as far as Phase III clinical trials. It acts as an RNA-dependent RNA polymerase inhibitor. It is a prodrug which is converted inside the body to the active form, 2'-C-methylcytidine triphosphate.
