= Veligrotug =

Medication

Clinical data
- Trade names: Lumvoa
- Other names: AVE-1642, VRDN-001, veligrotug-vvze
- AHFS/Drugs.com: Multum Consumer Information
- License data: US DailyMed: Veligrotug
- Routes of administration: Intravenous
- Drug class: Insulin-like growth factor-1 receptor inhibitor
- ATC code: None

Legal status
- Legal status: US: ℞-only

Identifiers
- CAS Number: 2728655-31-8
- UNII: Z9U2SS9ZC8
- KEGG: D12952

Chemical and physical data
- Formula: C_{6580}H_{10160}N_{1752}O_{2038}S_{40}
- Molar mass: 147702.29 g·mol^{−1}

Veligrotug, sold under the brand name Lumvoa, is a monoclonal antibody medication used for the treatment of thyroid eye disease. It is an insulin-like growth factor-1 receptor inhibitor. It is given via intravenous injection.

Veligrotug was approved for medical use in the United States in June 2026.

== Medical uses ==
Veligrotug is indicated for the treatment of thyroid eye disease regardless of thyroid eye disease activity or duration.

== Society and culture ==
=== Legal status ===
Veligrotug was approved for medical use in the United States in June 2026.

=== Names ===
Veligrotug is the international nonproprietary name.

Veligrotug is sold under the brand name Lumvoa.
