= Barium sulfate suspension =

Contrast agent used during X-rays

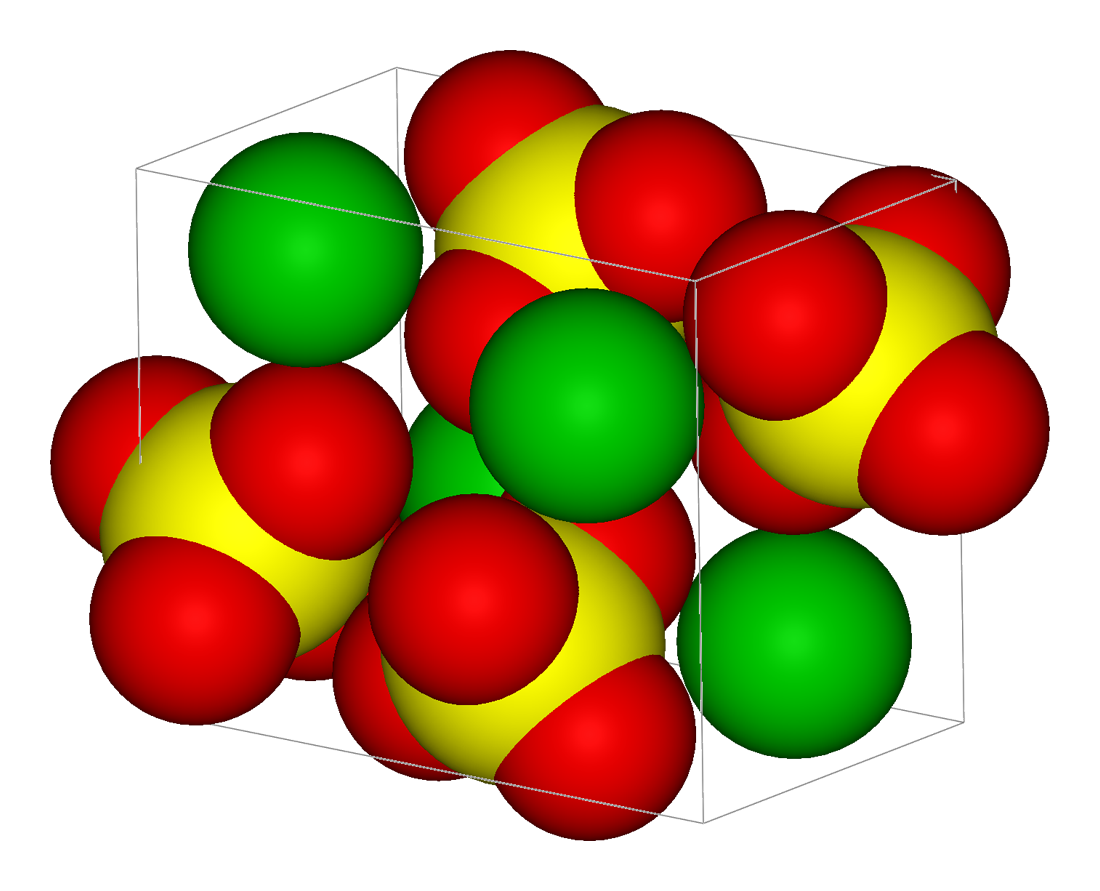
- 3D model of barium sulfate

Clinical data
- AHFS/Drugs.com: Multum Consumer Information
- License data: US DailyMed: Barium sulfate
- Routes of administration: By mouth, rectal
- ATC code: V08BA01 (WHO)

Legal status
- Legal status: US: ℞-only

Identifiers
- CAS Number: 7727-43-7
- PubChem CID: 24414
- UNII: 25BB7EKE2E
- KEGG: D02052

Chemical and physical data
- Formula: BaO_{4}S
- Molar mass: 233.38 g·mol^{−1}

Barium sulfate suspension, often simply called barium, is a contrast agent used during X-rays. Specifically it is used to improve visualization of the gastrointestinal tract (esophagus, stomach, intestines) on plain X-ray or computed tomography. It is taken by mouth or used rectally.

Side effects include constipation, diarrhea, appendicitis, and, if inhaled, inflammation of the lungs. It is not recommended in people with intestinal perforation or bowel obstruction. Allergic reactions are rare. The use of barium during pregnancy is safe for the baby; however, X-rays may result in harm. Barium sulfate suspension is typically made by mixing barium sulfate powder with water. It is a non-iodinated contrast media.

Barium sulfate has been known since the Middle Ages. In the United States it had come into common medical use by 1910. It is on the World Health Organization's List of Essential Medicines. Some versions contain flavors to try to make it taste better.

== Medical uses ==
Barium sulfate suspensions are provided by a radiologist or radiographer in advance of, or during a CT scan or fluoroscopic study to allow for better visualization of the gastrointestinal tract, such as in upper or lower gastrointestinal series. In upper gastrointestinal series, the patient is instructed to take nothing by mouth, which means to abstain from eating and drinking (fasting), with the exception of drinking the barium sulfate suspension. The amount of time for this fast may vary, depending on the instructions given by the imaging facility and the area of the body to be scanned, but generally lasts for several hours prior to the scan. The patient generally skips one meal, along with abstaining from all liquids, clear or otherwise, during this time.

Consumption of the barium sulfate suspension begins 90 minutes to two hours prior to the CT/Fluoroscopic scan, as instructed in the patient education provided. For a Barium Swallow or Dysphagiagram the barium is consumed after the study begins to discern if the patient has difficulties swallowing or masticating. Consumption is paced, beginning two hours before the scan is to occur, with levels marked on the provided container indicating how much is to be consumed between each of the two hours prior to the test. A small portion of the suspension is reserved for the minutes just before the test, to ensure that as much of the gastrointestinal tract as possible is coated.

After the scan is complete, the patient is encouraged to eat and drink normally, with special attention to plenty of fluids. The barium sulfate is excreted through defecation, so extra fluid intake helps prevent constipation, which is a possible side effect (see Johns Hopkins Medicine Health Library for an example of a possible patient education instruction sheet).

== Side effects ==
Side effects include nausea, diarrhea, a feeling of weakness, pale skin, ringing in the ears, constipation, and vomiting.

== Taste and texture ==
Oral barium sulfate suspensions are sometimes described as having the consistency of a very thick glass of milk, or a very thin milkshake. Some patients may experience the texture as a chalky liquid, similar to calcium carbonate containing liquid antacids and with a slight medicinal taste.

Some preparations of barium sulfate have added flavors to make them easier to tolerate. In general, the flavor is considered unpleasant, and is dependent on the exact makeup of the drink.
