= Vosaroxin =

Names
- Preferred IUPAC name 7-[(3S,4S)-3-Methoxy-4-(methylamino)pyrrolidin-1-yl]-4-oxo-1-(1,3-thiazol-2-yl)-1,4-dihydro-1,8-naphthyridine-3-carboxylic acid

Identifiers
CAS Number	175414-77-4
3D model (JSmol)	Interactive image
ChEBI	CHEBI:231651
ChemSpider	8128494
PubChem CID	9952884
UNII	K6A90IIZ19
CompTox Dashboard (EPA)	DTXSID50938662
- InChI: InChI=1S/C18H19N5O4S/c1-19-12-8-22(9-13(12)27-2)14-4-3-10-15(24)11(17(25)26)7-23(16(10)21-14)18-20-5-6-28-18/h3-7,12-13,19H,8-9H2,1-2H3,(H,25,26)/t12-,13-/m0/s1 Key: XZAFZXJXZHRNAQ-STQMWFEESA-N; InChI=1/C18H19N5O4S/c1-19-12-8-22(9-13(12)27-2)14-4-3-10-15(24)11(17(25)26)7-23(16(10)21-14)18-20-5-6-28-18/h3-7,12-13,19H,8-9H2,1-2H3,(H,25,26)/t12-,13-/m0/s1 Key: XZAFZXJXZHRNAQ-STQMWFEEBT
- SMILES: CN[C@H]1CN(C[C@@H]1OC)C2=NC3=C(C=C2)C(=O)C(=CN3C4=NC=CS4)C(=O)O

Properties
Chemical formula	C_{18}H_{19}N_{5}O_{4}S
Molar mass	401.44 g·mol^{−1}
Density	1.5±0.1 g/cm^{3}
Boiling point	652,0±65,0 °C a 760 mmHg

Pharmacology
ATC code	L01XX53 (WHO)

Hazards
Flash point	348.1±34.3 °C
- Except where otherwise noted, data are given for materials in their standard state (at 25 °C [77 °F], 100 kPa). Infobox references

Vosaroxin (AG-7352, SPC-595, SNS 595, voreloxin) is a topoisomerase II inhibitor causing site-selective DNA damage. It is under phase III clinical trial investigation for acute myelogenous leukemia (AML) and ovarian cancer sponsored by Sunesis.

== Mechanism of action ==
Vosaroxin is a naphthyridine analog of the anticancer quinolone derivatives (AQDs), a class of compounds that has not been used previously for the treatment of cancer. Topoisomerase II enzymes are essential for the survival of eukaryotic cells. Vosaroxin hinders the reunion of topoisomerase II-induced double-strand breaks at selective sites in DNA, resulting in G2 arrest and cell death by apoptosis.

== Medical uses ==
Vosaroxin has been investigated primarily for the treatment of relapsed or refractory acute myeloid leukemia (AML). Phase I/II studies suggested antileukemic activity and manageable toxicity, and the phase III VALOR trial evaluated vosaroxin plus cytarabine versus placebo plus cytarabine in adults with relapsed/refractory AML.

== Clinical trials ==
In the VALOR study, vosaroxin combined with cytarabine did not significantly improve overall survival in the full study population compared with placebo plus cytarabine. However, pre-specified subgroup analyses (such as patients aged ≥60 years or those with early relapse) showed trends toward improved outcomes, including higher complete remission rates.

== Pharmacokinetics ==
Phase I pharmacokinetic studies demonstrated linear pharmacokinetics across the investigated dose range (9–90 mg/m^{2}). Vosaroxin shows a mean terminal half-life of approximately 24–25 hours, predominantly non-renal clearance, and a volume of distribution consistent with extensive tissue penetration. Co-administration with cytarabine does not significantly alter vosaroxin pharmacokinetics.

== Adverse effects ==
The most common adverse events reported include myelosuppression (neutropenia, thrombocytopenia, and anemia) and infections or fever associated with neutropenia. In combination studies with cytarabine, higher rates of febrile neutropenia, mucositis, and stomatitis were observed compared with cytarabine alone. Severe non-hematologic toxicities were relatively uncommon, and clinically meaningful QT prolongation was rare in published data.

== Chemistry ==
Vosaroxin (also known as voreloxin, AG-7352, and SNS-595) is a small-molecule anticancer agent with the molecular formula C_{18}H_{19}N_{5}O_{4}S. It is a quinolone-derived naphthyridine analog structurally distinct from anthracyclines, but produces double-strand DNA breaks through topoisomerase II inhibition. Key identifiers include PubChem CID 9952884 and InChIKey XZAFZXJXZHRNAQ-STQMWFEESA-N.

== History ==
Vosaroxin was developed by Sunesis Pharmaceuticals (initially known as voreloxin/SNS-595). The clinical development program included multiple phase I and II studies and culminated in the phase III VALOR trial in relapsed/refractory AML. Although signals of efficacy were observed in specific patient subgroups, results from the overall study population did not lead to regulatory approval, and ongoing interest has focused on biomarker-defined subsets.

== Research directions ==
Preclinical studies and reviews suggest potential activity of vosaroxin in models resistant to anthracyclines, partly due to differences in P-glycoprotein efflux and DNA damage mechanisms. Investigations continue into biomarkers of response, such as DNA damage–repair pathways, and whether specific AML subgroups may benefit in future studies.
