= Integrin alpha 2 =

Mammalian protein found in Homo sapiens

ITGA2
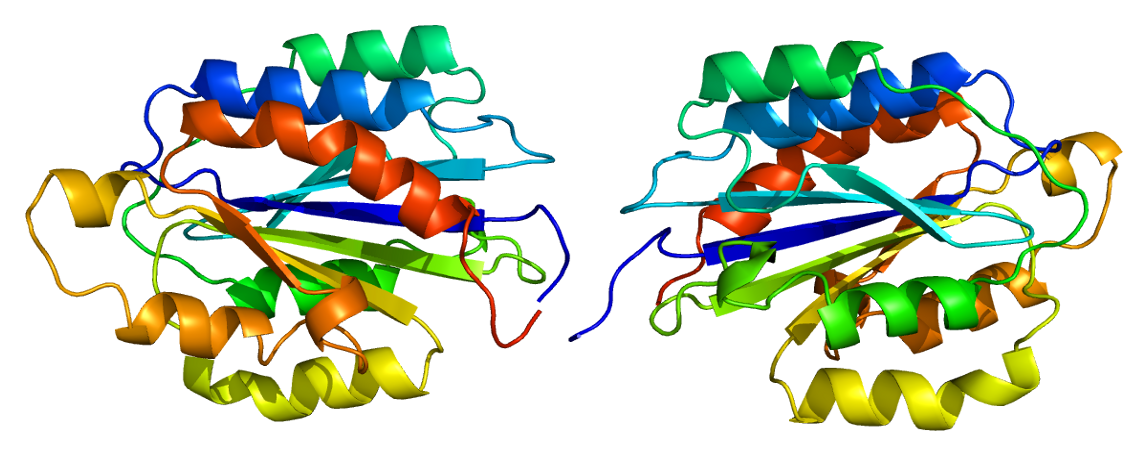

Identifiers
- Aliases: ITGA2, BR, CD49B, GPIa, HPA-5, VLA-2, VLAA2, integrin subunit alpha 2
- External IDs: OMIM: 192974; MGI: 96600; GeneCards: ITGA2
Available structures
PDB	Ortholog search: PDBe RCSB
PDB	List of PDB id codes 1AOX, 1DZI, 1V7P, 4BJ3

Gene location (Human)
Chr.	Chromosome 5 (human)
Band	5q11.2	Start	52,989,340 bp
Band	5q11.2	End	53,094,779 bp

Gene location (Mouse)
Chr.	Chromosome 13 (mouse)
Band	13 D2.2|13 64.61 cM	Start	114,969,617 bp
Band	13 D2.2|13 64.61 cM	End	115,068,636 bp
RNA expression pattern
Bgee	Human / Mouse (ortholog); Top expressed in: ventricular zone; epithelium of nasopharynx; bronchial epithelial cell; islet of Langerhans; visceral pleura; skin of thigh; skin of hip; gingival epithelium; seminal vesicula; vulva / Top expressed in: gastrula; cumulus cell; lumbar spinal ganglion; molar; blood; trigeminal ganglion; Paneth cell; decidua; left lung lobe; stellate reticulum; More reference expression data
BioGPS	n/a
Gene ontology
Molecular function	collagen binding; virus receptor activity; protein-containing complex binding; collagen receptor activity; metal ion binding; integrin binding; protein binding; collagen binding involved in cell-matrix adhesion; protein heterodimerization activity; laminin binding; amyloid-beta binding; heparan sulfate proteoglycan binding
Cellular component	axon terminus; integral component of membrane; cell projection; membrane; focal adhesion; basal part of cell; plasma membrane; cell surface; integrin complex; axon; integrin alpha2-beta1 complex; perinuclear region of cytoplasm; external side of plasma membrane; nucleus
Biological process	positive regulation of collagen biosynthetic process; positive regulation of inflammatory response; response to hypoxia; positive regulation of phagocytosis, engulfment; skin morphogenesis; response to organic cyclic compound; collagen-activated signaling pathway; positive regulation of leukocyte migration; establishment of protein localization; positive regulation of transmission of nerve impulse; female pregnancy; cellular response to estradiol stimulus; cellular response to organic cyclic compound; hepatocyte differentiation; positive regulation of epithelial cell migration; blood coagulation; extracellular matrix organization; positive regulation of cell projection organization; response to L-ascorbic acid; wound healing; positive regulation of translation; substrate-dependent cell migration; mammary gland development; positive regulation of smooth muscle cell migration; focal adhesion assembly; cell-substrate adhesion; cellular response to mechanical stimulus; cell adhesion; response to parathyroid hormone; cell adhesion mediated by integrin; positive regulation of alkaline phosphatase activity; response to amine; hypotonic response; animal organ morphogenesis; mesodermal cell differentiation; integrin-mediated signaling pathway; positive regulation of collagen binding; viral entry into host cell; positive regulation of DNA binding; cell-matrix adhesion; cell population proliferation; viral process; positive regulation of smooth muscle contraction; response to muscle activity; positive regulation of cell adhesion; positive regulation of smooth muscle cell proliferation; positive regulation of positive chemotaxis; detection of mechanical stimulus involved in sensory perception of pain
Sources:Amigo / QuickGO
Orthologs
Databases	NCBI: entry; OMA: entry
Species	Human	Mouse
Entrez	3673	16398
Ensembl	ENSG00000164171	ENSMUSG00000015533
UniProt	P17301	Q62469
RefSeq (mRNA)	NM_002203	NM_008396
RefSeq (protein)	NP_002194	NP_032422
Location (UCSC)	Chr 5: 52.99 – 53.09 Mb	Chr 13: 114.97 – 115.07 Mb
PubMed search
- Wikidata
View/Edit Human	View/Edit Mouse

Integrin alpha-2, or CD49b (cluster of differentiation 49b), is a transmembrane protein which in humans is encoded by the CD49b gene.

The CD49b protein is an integrin alpha subunit. It makes up half of the α2β1 integrin duplex. Integrins are heterodimeric integral membrane glycoproteins composed of a distinct alpha chain and a common beta chain. They are found on a wide variety of cell types including T cells (the NKT cells), NK cells, fibroblasts and platelets. Integrins are involved in cell adhesion and also participate in cell-surface-mediated signalling. The α2β1 integrin functions primarily as a recepter for collagen, making it important in tissues like the skin, bone, and blood vessels.

Expression of CD49b in conjunction with LAG-3 has been used to identify type 1 regulatory (Tr1) cells.

The DX5 monoclonal antibody recognizes mouse CD49b.

== Interactions ==
CD49b has been shown to interact with MMP1.

== Structure ==
The ITGA2 gene is located on chromosome 5q11.2 and encodes the integrin alpha-2 (CD49b) protein. This is a type I transmembrane Glycoprotein that belongs to the integrin alpha chain family. The mature α2 subunit associates non-covalently with the β1 integrin subunit to form the α2β1 integrin receptor. This is a major collagen-binding integrin in vertebrates.

Integrin α2 is an integrin alpha subunit, so it is made of a large extracellular domain, a single transmembrane domain, and a short cytoplasmic tail. The extracellular region contains an inserted (I) domain, or the αI domain. This is responsible for recognizing and binding collagen molecules within the extracellular matrix. Binding to collagen needs divalent cations such as magnesium (Mg2+) and manganese (Mn2+). This stabilizes the ligand-binding site and regulates receptor affinity.

The α2β1 integrin has inactive and active conformations with different affinity for extracellular ligand. Intracellular signaling may lead to conformational changes of the integrin and increase the affinity to ligands (inside-out signaling), whereas ligand binding initiates signaling pathways that influence cell adhesion, migration, proliferation, and survival (outside-in signaling).

== Ligands ==
The main ligand for α2β1 integrin is collagen, and thus, it is considered one of the main receptors for collagen on mammalian cells. The receptor interacts highly with fibrillar collagen types, especially type I collagen, which is plentiful in connective tissues including skin, tendon, and bone. It also recognizes type IV collagen, which is an important part of basement membranes and permits cells to associate with different ECM components. Even though collagen is its primary ligand, there are several other proteins with which α2β1 integrin interacts, such as Laminin; however, the affinity in these cases is usually lower.

The ligand binding occurs due to the presence of the inserted αI (I) domain that is located in the extracellular domain of the α2 subunit. The MIDAS domain of the protein binds divalent cation, magnesium ions (Mg²⁺) and manganese ions (Mn²⁺), required for the ligand binding. Changes in conformation control the binding affinity of the receptor towards the extracellular ligands and help α2β1 integrin to change from an inactive to an active state under the influence of both extracellular and intracellular stimuli.

The interaction between α2β1 integrin and collagen anchors cells to the extracellular matrix and initiates intracellular signaling pathways that regulate cellular behavior.

== Biological functions ==
Besides being a structural receptor, integrin α2β1 is a signaling receptor which receives signals from the extracellular medium to the intracellular part of the cell.

Integrin α2β1 controls the process of cell migration. The process of cell migration takes place during embryogenesis, wound healing, and tissue remodeling. In these cases, the cells have to move through the extracellular matrix in a controlled manner. The interaction between α2β1 integrin and collagen functions in the migration of cells by creating focal adhesion that are specialized protein structures which assist in connecting actin filament of the cytoskeleton to the extracellular matrix.

The receptor has a role in intracellular signaling pathway that regulate cell proliferation, cellular differentiation, and survival. It activates the signal molecules such as FAK, Src family of kinases, phosphoinositide 3-kinase (PI3K) and mitogen-activated protein kinase (MAPK). All these processes contribute to gene expression, reorganization of the cytoskeleton, and response to environmental cues. These functions allow α2β1 in the regulation of normal tissue homeostasis and repair and adaptation of the cells to the changes in the environment provided by the extracellular matrix. Integrin α2β1 is involved in the process of hemostasis as the integrin facilitates the adhesion of platelets to exposed collagen at sites of vascular damage.

The receptor is also important to the immune system functioning. CD49b receptor is located on Natural killer cells, Natural killer T cells, and certain types of activated T cell. It mediates migration and cell-to-cell interactions within tissue microenvironments. As for the use of the receptor in immunology, the co-expression of the CD49b receptor with the lymphocyte activation gene 3 receptor (LAG-3) is widely used in studies as a phenotypic marker of Tr1 regulatory T cell, which is a particular type of regulatory T cell responsible for maintaining immune tolerance.

Not only in physiological conditions, but also in the case of pathologies, the integrin α2β1 participates in tissue remodeling and turnover of extracellular matrix. The pathway of collagen signal transduction through the integrin α2β1 controls collagen production and other aspects of matrix organization. The pathology in case of disorders of this process may be observed in fibrosis, whereas dysregulation of α2β1 integrin expression is linked to metastasis and tumor invasion. It may be concluded that integrin α2β1 is a functional molecule, and not only a molecular structure for adhesion.

== Immune function ==
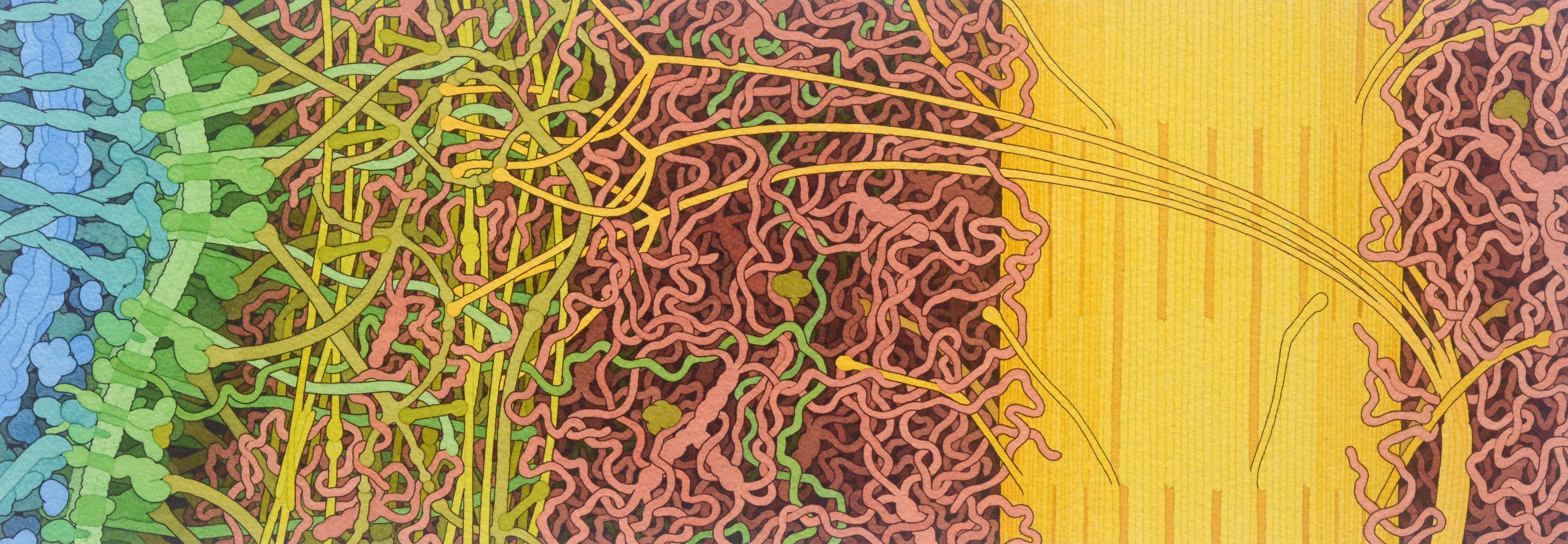
Collagen fibers within the extracellular matrix.

Hemostasis is a natural mechanism for minimizing blood loss due to vessel damage while ensuring adequate blood circulation in the organism under Physiologically normal conditions. Platelet adhesion to the exposed collagen due to the action of integrin α2β1 is one of the mechanisms of primary hemostasis. In the state of physiological health, collagen is present below the endothelium and is not accessible to platelets circulating in the blood stream. The damage to the walls of the vessel makes collagen accessible for the platelets and allows them to adhere to collagen fibers due to the activity of platelet collagen receptors, such as α2β1 integrin and GPVI.

In contrast to the GPVI functioning as a signaling receptor, α2β1 mainly provides the stabilization of the platelet adhesion to the collagen and facilitates their stable fixation on the damaged area. This process is especially necessary in case of high shear stresses in the arteries due to the negative impact of the blood flow force on platelets' fixation. The enhanced adhesion allows attracting more platelets and forming a stable thrombus that is capable of minimizing blood loss.

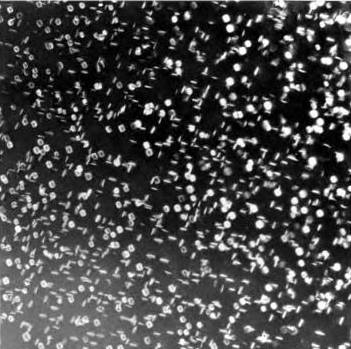
Electron micrograph of platelets

α2β1-mediated collagen binding also stimulates outside-in signaling, which plays a role in platelet spreading and cytoskeletal remodeling, thus increasing the surface area of the activated platelets and providing a way for interaction between them and neighboring platelets and coagulation factors. This process helps in the stabilization of the forming clot. Though α2β1 receptor on its own cannot activate the platelets completely, it cooperates with other platelet receptors such as GPVI, to form a thrombus after vascular injury.

The α2β1 integrin facilitates primary hemostasis through platelet adhesion to collagen exposed after injury to the Endothelial cells of blood vessels. In healthy vessels, collagen is found underneath the endothelial cells and is not accessible to platelets flowing through the blood vessels. After wounding, the collagen is exposed and enables the platelet receptors for collagen, such as α2β1 integrin and GPVI, to adhere to the wound surface and begin the formation of a hemostatic plug. Unlike GPVI, that is mainly responsible for signal transduction, α2β1 integrin is predominantly responsible for increasing platelet adhesion to collagen and stabilizing platelet attachment to the site of injury.

Stable engagement becomes especially relevant in situations involving high shear stress in the arterial system because the force of the flowing blood might disrupt the attachment of platelets. Through strengthening adhesion, α2β1 integrin facilitates aggregation of extra platelets and the development of a stable thrombus that is capable of stopping the bleeding. The engagement of collagen receptors through α2β1 integrin stimulates inside-out signaling and platelet spreading as well as remodeling of the cytoskeleton. This results in increased surface area of platelets, making their contact with surrounding platelets and coagulation factors possible.

Platelet adhesion being important for physiological hemostasis, any variations in the expression of ITGA2 gene or its products may affect the rate of bleeding or development of thrombosis. There are some polymorphism of the ITGA2 gene, the presence of which results in various collagen-binding capacities in people due to different densities of the α2β1 receptor on the platelets' surface. Though the impact of these variations is still unclear, their relation to myocardial infarction and Ischemic stroke has been studied. Therefore, α2β1 receptor still remains an interesting Therapeutic target for the prevention of pathological thrombosis.

== Clinical significance ==
Deregulation of the expression and function of ITGA2 has been shown to be involved in a number of pathological states such as cancer, fibrosis, and cardiovascular disease. As integrin α2β1 mediates cellular interactions with the extracellular matrix, any changes in its expression may affect cellular activity and disease development.

One of the most studied functions of the α2β1 integrin is connected with cancer biology. It has been shown that dysregulated expression of ITGA2 occurs in a number of cancers including breast, prostate, pancreatic, lung, colorectal, and gastric cancer. In most types of tumors, elevated expression of α2β1 increases the capacity of cancer cells to bind with collagen-rich extracellular matrices and migrate to other tissues. However, there is evidence that in some cancers the function of α2β1 might be involved in tumor suppression due to the maintenance of normal cell-matrix interactions.

Further, changes in the level of activity of α2β1 have been associated with development of fibrosis. This condition is known to be associated with the deposition of excess quantities of extracellular matrix components, mostly collagens. Therefore, the activation of the signaling pathways mediated by the α2β1 integrin is likely to play a role in matrix remodeling in conditions such as pulmonary, hepatic, renal, and cardiac fibrosis. As a result, scientists have hypothesized that it might be possible to regulate the activity of α2β1 to prevent collagen accumulation.

As for Thrombotic disease, there have been several attempts to identify the contribution of α2β1-related genes to the development of this disorder. For example, polymorphisms in the ITGA2 gene can influence the density of α2β1 receptors in the platelet membrane, thus affecting the interaction of platelets with collagen and, consequently, their ability to form thrombi. However, the relationship of the described polymorphisms to myocardial infarction or ischemic stroke was rather inconsistent.

It has also been reported that ITGA2 can be used as a biomarker for the diagnosis and prognosis of diseases. Overexpression of the ITGA2 gene is correlated with worse outcomes of several types of cancers, which implies the possibility of predicting aggressiveness, metastasis and survival based on the expression of this protein. With further development of transcriptomics and proteomics studies, ITGA2 was recognized as one of the candidates for a biomarker of disease progression and evaluation of the effect of targeted therapies.

Since this integrin is responsible for many pathologies, it has become an attractive target for therapy. Monoclonal antibodies, peptides, and other molecules were developed to inhibit the functions of integrin α2β1 related to binding of cells to extracellular matrix components and subsequent signal transduction. However, there are no specific therapeutic agents targeting integrin α2β1 currently available for clinical use.
