= List of Candida species =

As of February 2026, Species Fungorum lists 153 names for species in Candida (fungus) which are not considered a synonym.

== Species ==
- Candida africana
- Candida alai
- Candida albicans
- Candida anglica
- Candida aquae-textoris
- Candida arabinofermentans
- Candida argentea
- Candida ascalaphidarum
- Candida aurita
- Candida bentonensis
- Candida berolinensis
- Candida bertae
- Candida blackwelliae
- Candida blancii
- Candida blankii
- Candida bohioensis
- Candida boidinii
- Candida boleticola
- Candida bombicola
- Candida broadrunensis
- Candida bromeliacearum
- Candida buenavistaensis
- Candida caryicola
- Candida cellulolytica
- Candida cetoniae
- Candida chauliodis
- Candida chilensis
- Candida citrica
- Candida coleopterorum
- Candida corniculata
- Candida corydali
- Candida danieliae
- Candida dattila
- Candida delhiana
- Candida digboiensis
- Candida dubliniensis
- Candida fermentati
- Candida fluviatilis
- Candida fragicola
- Candida freyschussii
- Candida frijolesensis
- Candida gigantensis
- Candida glaebosa
- Candida glucosophila
- Candida golubevii
- Candida hainanensis
- Candida heliconiae
- Candida hispaniensis
- Candida hyderabadensis
- Candida hydrocarbofumarica
- Candida incommunis
- Candida insectalens
- Candida jiufengensis
- Candida kantuleensis
- Candida labiduridarum
- Candida lassenensis
- Candida lipophila
- Candida lodderae
- Candida lundiana
- Candida lyxosophila
- Candida magnifica
- Candida maltosa
- Candida manassasensis
- Candida margitis
- Candida maris
- Candida massiliensis
- Candida mengyuniae
- Candida mesenterica
- Candida metapsilosis
- Candida methanosorbosa
- Candida montana
- Candida montrocheri
- Candida morakotiae
- Candida multis-gemmis
- Candida namnaoensis
- Candida nanaspora
- Candida neerlandica
- Candida nemodendra
- Candida nitratophila
- Candida nonsorbophila
- Candida norvegica
- Candida odintsovae
- Candida oleophila
- Candida olivae
- Candida onishii
- Candida orba
- Candida orthopsilosis
- Candida ovalis
- Candida oxycetoniae
- Candida palmioleophila
- Candida palmyrensis
- Candida parablackwelliae
- Candida parachauliodis
- Candida parapolymorpha
- Candida parapsilosis
- Candida pellucidi
- Candida peoriensis
- Candida piceae
- Candida pignaliae
- Candida pinus
- Candida ponderosae
- Candida pseudocylindracea
- Candida pseudofarinosa
- Candida pseudoglaebosa
- Candida pseudojiufengensis
- Candida pseudotumoralis
- Candida psychrophila
- Candida qinlingensis
- Candida railenensis
- Candida rishiriensis
- Candida robusta
- Candida rongomai-pounamu
- Candida saitoana
- Candida sake
- Candida santamariae
- Candida schatavii
- Candida silvanorum
- Candida silvatica
- Candida silvicultrix
- Candida sinolaborantium
- Candida sojae
- Candida solani
- Candida soli
- Candida sonorensis
- Candida sophiae-reginae
- Candida sorboxylosa
- Candida spenceri
- Candida sphagnicola
- Candida subhashii
- Candida succiphila
- Candida suthepensis
- Candida suzukii
- Candida takamatsuzukensis
- Candida temnochilae
- "Candida theae"
- Candida tibetensis
- Candida tocantinsensis
- Candida tropicalis
- Candida tumulicola
- Candida tunisiensis
- Candida ulmi
- Candida vespimorsuum
- Candida vini
- Candida viswanathii
- Candida vrieseae
- Candida wancherniae
- Candida wuzhishanensis
- Candida xiaguanensis
- Candida xylosifermentans
- Candida xyloterini
- Candida yunnanensis
- Candida zemplinina
- Candida zeylanoides
