= Oral candidiasis =

Fungal infection

- Other names: oral candidosis, oral thrush, oropharyngeal candidiasis, moniliasis, candidal stomatitis, muguet
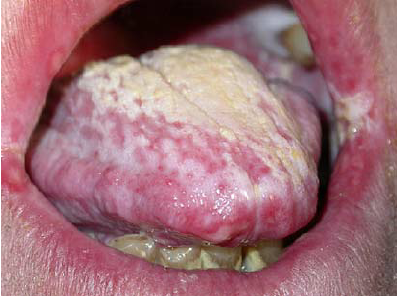
- An example of oral pseudomembranous candidiasis on the dorsum of the tongue.
- Specialty: Infectious disease, dentistry, dermatology

Oral candidiasis (Acute pseudomembranous candidiasis), also known as oral thrush, is candidiasis that occurs in the mouth. That is, oral candidiasis is a mycosis (yeast/fungal infection) of Candida species on the mucous membranes of the mouth.

Candida albicans is the most commonly implicated organism in this condition. C. albicans is carried in the mouths of about 50% of the world's population as a normal component of the oral microbiota. This candidal carriage state is not considered a disease, but when Candida species become pathogenic and invade host tissues, oral candidiasis can occur. This change usually constitutes an opportunistic infection by normally harmless micro-organisms because of local (i.e., mucosal) or systemic factors altering host immunity.

== Classification ==
Traditional classification of oral candidiasis.
- Acute candidiasis:
  - pseudomembranous candidiasis (oral thrush)
  - atrophic candidiasis
- Chronic candidiasis:
  - atrophic candidiasis
  - hyperplastic candidiasis
    - chronic oral candidiasis (Candida leukoplakia)
    - candidiasis endocrinopathy syndrome
    - chronic localized mucocutaneous candidiasis
    - chronic diffuse candidiasis.

Classification of oral candidiasis.
- Primary oral candidiasis (group I)
  - Pseudomembranous (acute or chronic)
  - Erythematous (acute or chronic)
  - Hyperplastic: plaque-like, nodular
  - Candida-associated lesions: Denture related stomatitis, angular stomatitis, median rhomboid glossitis, linear gingival erythema
- Secondary oral candidiasis (group II)
  - Oral manifestations of systemic mucocutaneous candidiasis (due to diseases such as thymic aplasia and candidiasis endocrinopathy syndrome)

Oral candidiasis is a mycosis (fungal infection). Traditionally, oral candidiasis is classified using the Lehner system, originally described in the 1960s, into acute and chronic forms (see table). Some of the subtypes almost always occur as acute (e.g., acute pseudomembranous candidiasis), and others chronic. However, these typical presentations do not always hold true, which created problems with this system. A more recently proposed classification of oral candidiasis distinguishes primary oral candidiasis, where the condition is confined to the mouth and perioral tissues, and secondary oral candidiasis, where there is involvement of other parts of the body in addition to the mouth. The global human immunodeficiency virus/acquired immunodeficiency syndrome (HIV/AIDS) pandemic has been an important factor in the move away from the traditional classification since it has led to the formation of a new group of patients who present with atypical forms of oral candidiasis.

=== By appearance ===
Three main clinical appearances of candidiasis are generally recognized: pseudomembranous, erythematous (atrophic), and hyperplastic. Most often, affected individuals display one clear type or another, but sometimes there can be more than one clinical variant in the same person.

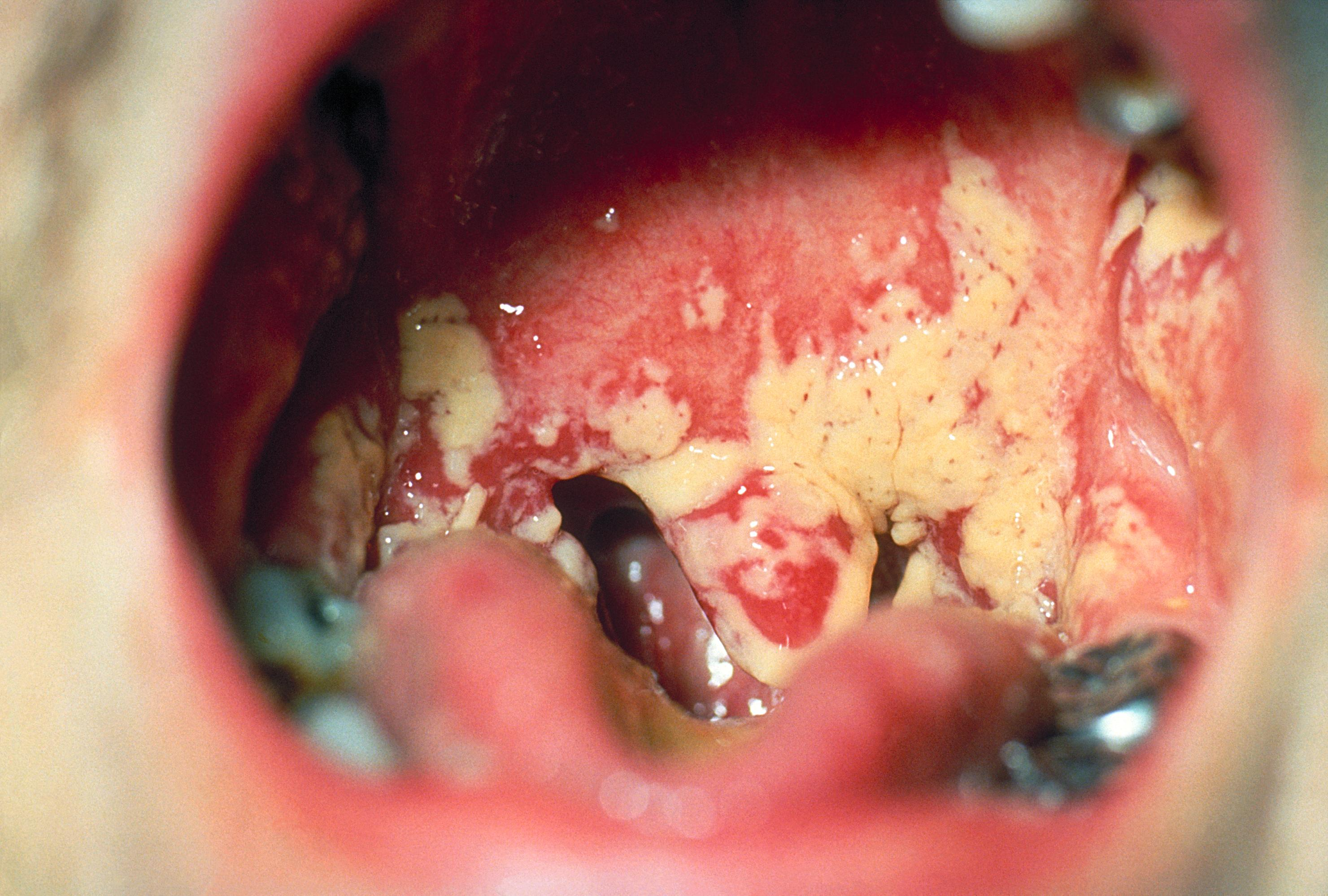
Pseudomembranous candidiasis in the mouth and oropharynx.

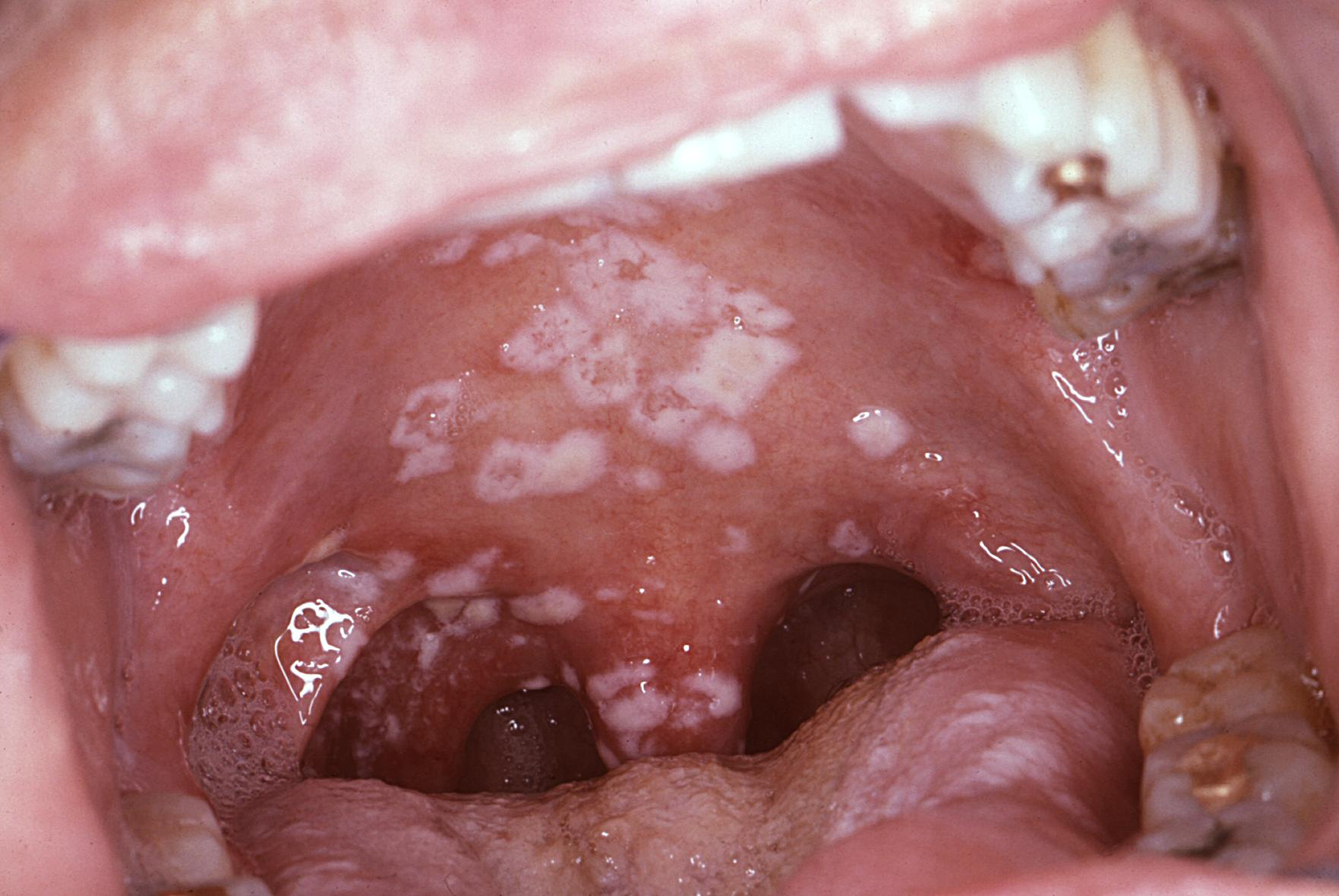
Pseudomembranous candidiasis in a person with HIV

==== Pseudomembranous ====
Acute pseudomembranous candidiasis is a classic form of oral candidiasis, commonly referred to as thrush. Overall, this is the most common type of oral candidiasis, accounting for about 35% of oral candidiasis cases.

It is characterized by a coating or individual patches of pseudomembranous white slough that can be easily wiped away to reveal erythematous (reddened), and sometimes minimally bleeding, mucosa beneath. These areas of pseudomembrane are sometimes described as "curdled milk", or "cottage cheese". The white material is made up of debris, fibrin, and desquamated epithelium that has been invaded by yeast cells and hyphae that invade to the depth of the stratum spinosum. As an erythematous surface is revealed beneath the pseudomembranes, some consider pseudomembranous candidiasis and erythematous candidiasis stages of the same entity. Some sources state that if there is bleeding when the pseudomembrane is removed, then the mucosa has likely been affected by an underlying process such as lichen planus or chemotherapy. Pseudomembraneous candidiasis can involve any part of the mouth, but usually it appears on the tongue, buccal mucosae or palate.

It is classically an acute condition, appearing in infants, people taking antibiotics or immunosuppressant medications, or immunocompromising diseases. However, sometimes it can be chronic and intermittent, even lasting for many years. Chronicity of this subtype generally occurs in immunocompromised states, (e.g., leukemia, HIV) or in persons who use corticosteroids topically or by aerosol. Acute and chronic pseudomembranous candidiasis are indistinguishable in appearance.

==== Erythematous ====
Erythematous (atrophic) candidiasis is when the condition appears as a red, raw-looking lesion. Some sources consider denture-related stomatitis, angular stomatitis, median rhomboid glossitis, and antibiotic-induced stomatitis as subtypes of erythematous candidiasis, since these lesions are commonly erythematous/atrophic. It may precede the formation of a pseudomembrane, be left when the membrane is removed, or arise without prior pseudomembranes. Some sources state that erythematous candidiasis accounts for 60% of oral candidiasis cases. Where it is associated with inhalation steroids (often used for treatment of asthma), erythematous candidiasis commonly appears on the palate or the dorsum of the tongue. On the tongue, there is loss of the lingual papillae (depapillation), leaving a smooth area.

Acute erythematous candidiasis usually occurs on the dorsum of the tongue in persons taking long term corticosteroids or antibiotics, but occasionally it can occur after only a few days of using a topical antibiotic. This is usually termed "antibiotic sore mouth", "antibiotic sore tongue", or "antibiotic-induced stomatitis" because it is commonly painful as well as red.

Chronic erythematous candidiasis is more usually associated with denture wearing (see denture-related stomatitis).

==== Hyperplastic ====
This variant is also sometimes termed "plaque-like candidiasis" or "nodular candidiasis". The most common appearance of hyperplastic candidiasis is a persistent white plaque that does not rub off. The lesion may be rough or nodular in texture. Hyperplastic candidiasis is uncommon, accounting for about 5% of oral candidiasis cases, and is usually chronic and found in adults. The most common site of involvement is the commissural region of the buccal mucosa, usually on both sides of the mouth.

Another term for hyperplastic candidiasis is "candidal leukoplakia". This term is a largely historical synonym for this subtype of candidiasis, rather than a true leukoplakia. Indeed, it can be clinically indistinguishable from true leukoplakia, but tissue biopsy shows candidal hyphae invading the epithelium. Some sources use this term to describe leukoplakia lesions that become colonized secondarily by Candida species, thereby distinguishing it from hyperplastic candidiasis. It is known that Candida resides more readily in mucosa that is altered, such as may occur with dysplasia and hyperkeratosis in an area of leukoplakia.

=== Associated lesions ===
Candida-associated lesions are primary oral candidiases (confined to the mouth), where the causes are thought to be multiple. For example, bacteria as well as Candida species may be involved in these lesions. Frequently, antifungal therapy alone does not permanently resolve these lesions, but rather the underlying predisposing factors must be addressed, in addition to treating the candidiasis.

==== Angular cheilitis ====
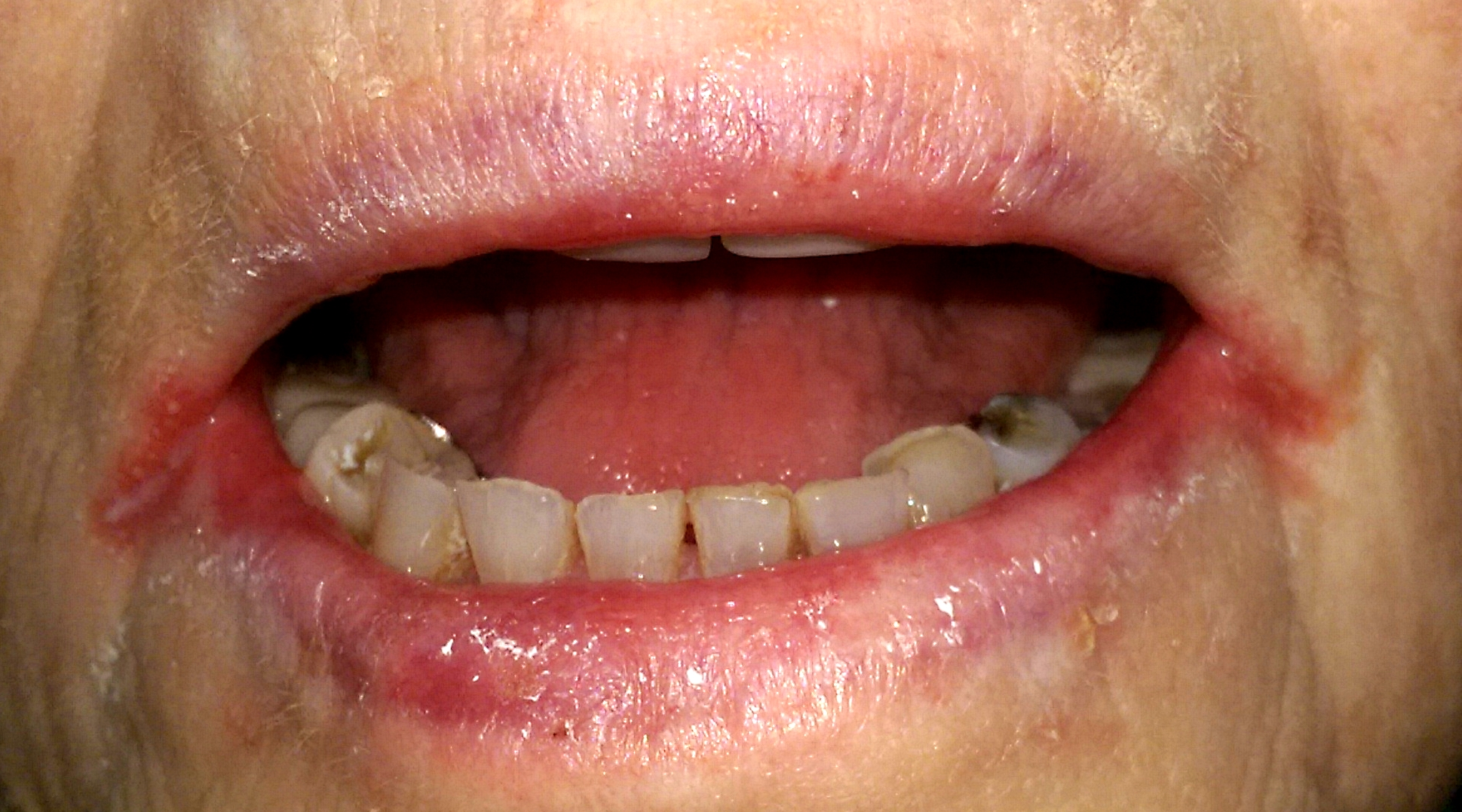
Angular cheilitis

Angular cheilitis is inflammation at the corners (angles) of the mouth, very commonly involving Candida species, when sometimes the terms "Candida-associated angular cheilitis", or less commonly "monilial perlèche" are used. Candida organisms alone are responsible for about 20% of cases, and a mixed infection of C. albicans and Staphylococcus aureus for about 60% of cases. Signs and symptoms include soreness, erythema (redness), and fissuring of one, or more commonly both the angles of the mouth, with edema (swelling) seen intraorally on the commissures (inside the corners of the mouth). Angular cheilitis generally occurs in elderly people and is associated with denture related stomatitis.

==== Denture-related stomatitis ====
This term refers to a mild inflammation and erythema of the mucosa beneath a denture, usually an upper denture in elderly edentulous individuals (with no natural teeth remaining). Some report that up to 65% of denture wearers have this condition to some degree. About 90% of cases are associated with Candida species, where sometimes the terms "Candida-associated denture stomatitis", or "Candida-associated denture-induced stomatitis" (CADIS), are used. Some sources state that this is by far the most common form of oral candidiasis. Although this condition is also known as "denture sore mouth", there is rarely any pain. Candida is associated with about 90% of cases of denture related stomatitis.

==== Median rhomboid glossitis ====
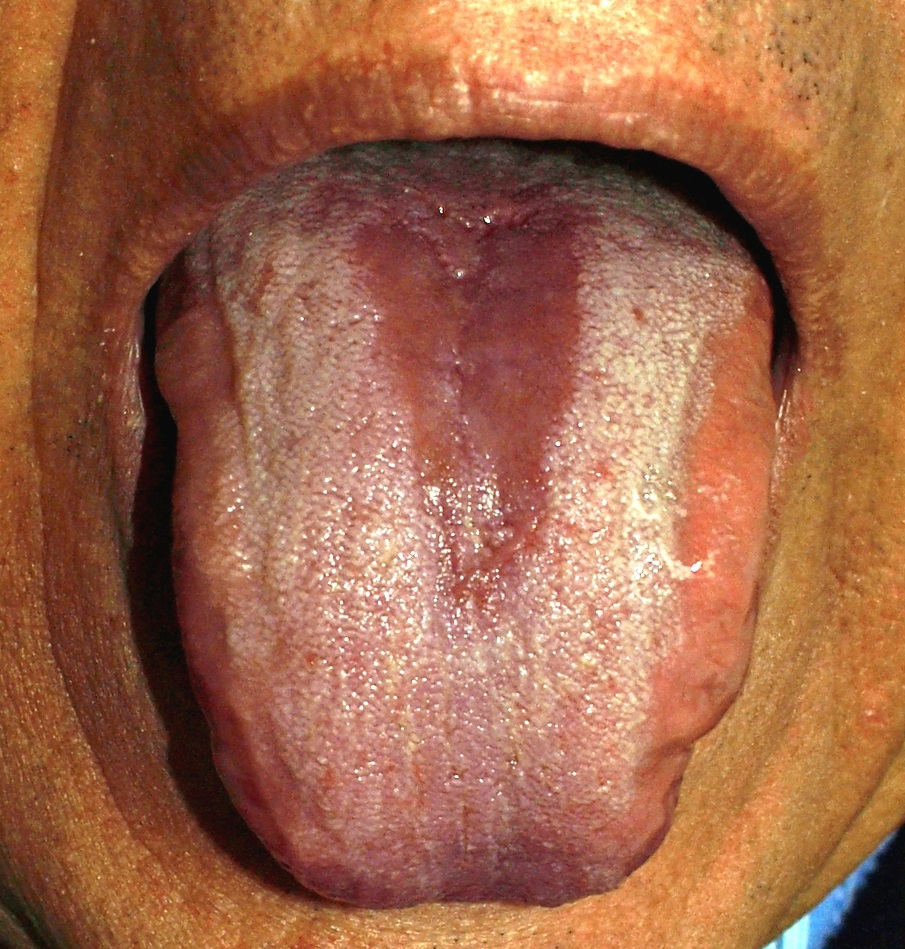
Median rhomboid glossitis

This is an elliptical or rhomboid lesion in the center of the dorsal tongue, just anterior (in front) of the circumvallate papillae. The area is depapillated, reddened (or red and white) and rarely painful. There is frequently Candida species in the lesion, sometimes mixed with bacteria.

==== Linear gingival erythema ====
This is a localized or generalized, linear band of erythematous gingivitis (inflammation of the gums). It was first observed in HIV infected individuals and termed "HIV-gingivitis", but the condition is not confined to this group. Candida species are involved, and in some cases the lesion responds to antifungal therapy, but it is thought that other factors exist, such as oral hygiene and human herpesviruses. This condition can develop into necrotizing ulcerative periodontitis.

=== Others ===
==== Chronic multifocal oral candidiasis ====
This is an uncommon form of chronic (more than one month in duration) candidal infection involving multiple areas in the mouth, without signs of candidiasis on other mucosal or cutaneous sites. The lesions are variably red and/or white. Unusually for candidal infections, there is an absence of predisposing factors such as immunosuppression, and it occurs in apparently healthy individuals, normally elderly males. Smoking is a known risk factor.

==== Chronic mucocutaneous candidiasis ====
This refers to a group of rare syndromes characterized by chronic candidal lesions on the skin, in the mouth and on other mucous membranes (i.e., a secondary oral candidiasis). These include Localized chronic mucocutaneous candidiasis, diffuse mucocutaneous candidiasis (Candida granuloma), candidiasis–endocrinopathy syndrome and candidiasis thymoma syndrome. About 90% of people with chronic mucocutaneous candidiasis have candidiasis in the mouth.

== Signs and symptoms ==
Signs and symptoms are dependent upon the type of oral candidiasis. Often, apart from the appearance of the lesions, there are usually no other signs or symptoms. Most types of oral candidiasis are painless, but a burning sensation may occur in some cases. Candidiasis can, therefore, sometimes be misdiagnosed as burning mouth syndrome. A burning sensation is more likely with erythematous (atrophic) candidiasis, whilst hyperplastic candidiasis is normally entirely asymptomatic. Acute atrophic candidiasis may feel like the mouth has been scalded with a hot liquid. Another potential symptom is a metallic, acidic, salty or bitter taste in the mouth. The pseudomembranous type rarely causes any symptoms apart from possibly some discomfort or bad taste due to the presence of the membranes. Sometimes the patient describes the raised pseudomembranes as "blisters." Occasionally there can be dysphagia (difficulty swallowing), which indicates that the candidiasis involves the oropharynx or the esophagus, as well as the mouth. The trachea and the larynx may also be involved where there is oral candidiasis, and this may cause hoarseness of the voice.

== Causes ==
=== Species ===
The causative organism is usually Candida albicans, or less commonly other Candida species such as (in decreasing order of frequency) Candida tropicalis, Candida glabrata, Candida parapsilosis, Candida krusei, or other species (Candida stellatoidea, Candida pseudotropicalis, Candida famata, Candida rugosa, Candida geotrichium, Candida dubliniensis, and Candida guilliermondii). C. albicans accounts for about 50% of oral candidiasis cases, and together C. albicans, C. tropicalis and C. glabrata account for over 80% of cases. Candidiasis caused by non-C. albicans Candida (NCAC) species is associated more with immunodeficiency. For example, in HIV/AIDS, C. dubliniensis and C. geotrichium can become pathogenic.

About 35-50% of humans possess C. albicans as part of their normal oral microbiota. With more sensitive detection techniques, this figure is reported to rise to 90%. This candidal carrier state is not considered a disease, since there are no lesions or symptoms of any kind. Oral carriage of Candida is pre-requisite for the development of oral candidiasis. For Candida species to colonize and survive as a normal component of the oral microbiota, the organisms must be capable of adhering to the epithelial surface of the mucous membrane lining the mouth. This adhesion involves adhesins (e.g., hyphal wall protein 1), and extracellular polymeric materials (e.g., mannoprotein). Therefore, strains of Candida with more adhesion capability have more pathogenic potential than other strains. The prevalence of Candida carriage varies with geographic location, and many other factors. Higher carriage is reported during the summer months, in females, in hospitalized individuals, in persons with blood group O and in non-secretors of blood group antigens in saliva. Increased rates of Candida carriage are also found in people who eat a diet high in carbohydrates, people who wear dentures, people with xerostomia (dry mouth), in people taking broad spectrum antibiotics, smokers, and in immunocompromised individuals (e.g., due to HIV/AIDS, diabetes, cancer, Down syndrome or malnutrition). Age also influences oral carriage, with the lowest levels occurring in newborns, increasing dramatically in infants, and then decreasing again in adults. Investigations have quantified oral carriage of Candida albicans at 300-500 colony forming units in healthy persons. More Candida is detected in the early morning and the late afternoon. The greatest quantity of Candida species are harbored on the posterior dorsal tongue, followed by the palatal and the buccal mucosae. Mucosa covered by an oral appliance such as a denture harbors significantly more candida species than uncovered mucosa.

When Candida species cause lesions - the result of invasion of the host tissues - this is termed candidiasis. Some consider oral candidiasis a change in the normal oral environment rather than an exposure or true "infection" as such. The exact process by which Candida species switch from acting as normal oral commensals (saprophytic) state in the carrier to acting as a pathogenic organism (parasitic state) is not completely understood.

Several Candida species are polymorphogenic, that is, capable of growing in different forms depending on the environmental conditions. C. albicans can appear as a yeast form (blastospores), which is thought to be relatively harmless; and a hyphal form associated with invasion of host tissues. Apart from true hyphae, Candida can also form pseudohyphae — elongated filamentous cells, lined end to end. As a general rule, candidiasis presenting with white lesions is mainly caused by Candida species in the hyphal form and red lesions by yeast forms. C. albicans and C. dubliniensis are also capable of forming germ tubes (incipient hyphae) and chlamydospores under the right conditions. C. albicans is categorized serologically into A or B serotypes. The prevalence is roughly equal in healthy individuals, but type B is more prevalent in immunocompromised individuals.

=== Predisposing factors ===
Common local and systemic predisposing factors.
Local host factors
- Dentures
- Corticosteroid inhalers
- Reduced salivary flow
- High sugar diet
Systemic host factors
- Extremes of age
- Endocrine disorders (e.g., diabetes)
- Immunosuppression
- Broad spectrum antibiotics (e.g., tetracycline)
- Nutritional deficiencies

The host defenses against opportunistic infection of candida species are

- The oral epithelium, which acts both as a physical barrier preventing micro-organisms from entering the tissues, and is the site of cell mediated immune reactions.
- Competition and inhibition interactions between candida species and other micro-organisms in the mouth, such as the many hundreds of different kinds of bacteria.
- Saliva, which possesses both mechanical cleansing action and immunologic action, including salivary immunoglobulin A antibodies, which aggregate candida organisms and prevent them adhering to the epithelial surface; and enzymatic components such as lysozyme, lactoperoxidase and antileukoprotease.

Disruption to any of these local and systemic host defense mechanisms constitutes a potential susceptibility to oral candidiasis, which rarely occurs without predisposing factors. It is often described as being "a disease of the diseased", occurring in the very young, the very old, or the very sick.

Oral candidiasis in an infant. At very young ages, the immune system is yet to develop fully.

==== Immunodeficiency ====
Immunodeficiency is a state of reduced function of the immune system, which can be caused by medical conditions or treatments.

Acute pseudomembranous candidiasis occurs in about 5% of newborn infants. Candida species are acquired from the mother's vaginal canal during birth. At very young ages, the immune system is yet to develop fully and there is no individual immune response to candida species. An infant's antibodies to the fungus are normally supplied by the mother's breast milk.

Other forms of immunodeficiency which may cause oral candidiasis include HIV/AIDS, active cancer and treatment, chemotherapy or radiotherapy.

Corticosteroid medications may contribute to the appearance of oral candidiasis, as they cause suppression of immune function either systemically or on a local/mucosal level, depending on the route of administration. Topically administered corticosteroids in the mouth may take the form of mouthwashes, dissolving lozenges or mucosal gels; sometimes being used to treat various forms of stomatitis. Systemic corticosteroids may also result in candidiasis.

Inhaled corticosteroids (e.g., for treatment of asthma or chronic obstructive pulmonary disease), are not intended to be administered topically in the mouth, but inevitably there is contact with the oral and oropharyngeal mucousa as it is inhaled. In asthmatics treated with inhaled steroids, clinically detectable oral candidiasis may occur in about 5-10% of adults and 1% of children. Where inhaled steroids are the cause, the candidal lesions are usually of the erythematous variety. Candidiasis appears at the sites where the steroid has contacted the mucosa, typically the dorsum of the tongue (median rhomboid glossitis) and sometimes also on the palate. Candidal lesions on both sites are sometimes termed "kissing lesions" because they approximate when the tongue is in contact with the palate.

==== Denture wearing ====
Denture wearing and poor denture hygiene, particularly wearing the denture continually rather than removing it during sleep, is another risk factor for both candidal carriage and oral candidiasis. Dentures provide a relative acidic, moist and anaerobic environment because the mucosa covered by the denture is sheltered from oxygen and saliva. Loose, poorly fitting dentures may also cause minor trauma to the mucosa, which is thought to increase the permeability of the mucosa and increase the ability of C. albicans to invade the tissues. These conditions all favor the growth of C. albicans. Sometimes dentures become very worn, or they have been constructed to allow insufficient lower facial height (occlusal vertical dimension), leading to over-closure of the mouth (an appearance sometimes described as "collapse of the jaws"). This causes deepening of the skin folds at the corners of the mouth (nasolabial crease), in effect creating intertriginous areas where another form of candidiasis, angular cheilitis, can develop. Candida species are capable of adhering to the surface of dentures, most of which are made from polymethylacrylate. They exploit micro-fissures and cracks in the surface of dentures to aid their retention. Dentures may therefore become covered in a biofilm, and act as reservoirs of infection, continually re-infecting the mucosa. For this reason, disinfecting the denture is a vital part of treatment of oral candidiasis in persons who wear dentures, as well as correcting other factors like inadequate lower facial height and fit of the dentures.

==== Dry mouth ====
Both the quantity and quality of saliva are important oral defenses against candida. Decreased salivary flow rate or a change in the composition of saliva, collectively termed salivary hypofunction or hyposalivation is an important predisposing factor. Xerostomia is frequently listed as a cause of candidiasis, but xerostomia can be subjective or objective, i.e., a symptom present with or without actual changes in the saliva consistency or flow rate.

==== Diet ====
Malnutrition, whether by malabsorption, or poor diet, especially hematinic deficiencies (iron, vitamin B12, folic acid) can predispose to oral candidiasis, by causing diminished host defense and epithelial integrity. For example, iron deficiency anemia is thought to cause depressed cell-mediated immunity. Some sources state that deficiencies of vitamin A or pyridoxine are also linked.

There is limited evidence that a diet high in carbohydrates predisposes to oral candidiasis. In vitro and studies show that Candidal growth, adhesion and biofilm formation is enhanced by the presence of carbohydrates such as glucose, galactose and sucrose.

==== Smoking ====
Smoking, especially heavy smoking, is an important predisposing factor but the reasons for this relationship are unknown. One hypothesis is that cigarette smoke contains nutritional factors for C. albicans, or that local epithelial alterations occur that facilitate colonization of candida species.

==== Antibiotics ====
Broad-spectrum antibiotics (e.g. tetracycline) eliminate the competing bacteria and disrupt the normally balanced ecology of oral microorganisms, which can cause antibiotic-induced candidiasis.

==== Other factors ====
Several other factors can contribute to infection, including endocrine disorders (e.g. diabetes when poorly controlled), and/or the presence of certain other mucosal lesions, especially those that cause hyperkeratosis and/or dysplasia (e.g. lichen planus). Such changes in the mucosa predispose it to secondary infection with candidiasis. Other physical mucosal alterations are sometimes associated with candida overgrowth, such as fissured tongue (rarely), tongue piercing, atopy, and/or hospitalization.

== Diagnosis ==
The diagnosis can typically be made from the clinical appearance alone, but not always. As candidiasis can be variable in appearance, and present with white, red or combined white and red lesions, the differential diagnosis can be extensive. In pseudomembraneous candidiasis, the membranous slough can be wiped away to reveal an erythematous surface underneath. This is helpful in distinguishing pseudomembraneous candidiasis from other white lesions in the mouth that cannot be wiped away, such as lichen planus, oral hairy leukoplakia. Erythematous candidiasis can mimic geographic tongue. Erythematous candidiasis usually has a diffuse border that helps distinguish it from erythroplakia, which normally has a sharply defined border.

Special investigations to detect the presence of candida species include oral swabs, oral rinse or oral smears. Smears are collected by gentle scraping of the lesion with a spatula or tongue blade and the resulting debris directly applied to a glass slide. Oral swabs are taken if culture is required. Some recommend that swabs be taken from 3 different oral sites. Oral rinse involves rinsing the mouth with phosphate-buffered saline for 1 minute and then spitting the solution into a vessel that examined in a pathology laboratory. Oral rinse technique can distinguish between commensal candidal carriage and candidiasis. If candidal leukoplakia is suspected, a biopsy may be indicated. Smears and biopsies are usually stained with periodic acid-Schiff, which stains carbohydrates in fungal cell walls in magenta. Gram staining is also used as Candida stains are strongly Gram positive.

Sometimes an underlying medical condition is sought, and this may include blood tests for full blood count and hematinics.

If a biopsy is taken, the histopathologic appearance can be variable depending upon the clinical type of candidiasis. Pseudomembranous candidiasis shows hyperplastic epithelium with a superficial parakeratotic desquamating (i.e., separating) layer. Hyphae penetrate to the depth of the stratum spinosum, and appear as weakly basophilic structures. Polymorphonuclear cells also infiltrate the epithelium, and chronic inflammatory cells infiltrate the lamina propria.

Atrophic candidiasis appears as thin, atrophic epithelium, which is non-keratinized. Hyphae are sparse, and inflammatory cell infiltration of the epithelium and the lamina propria. In essence, atrophic candidiasis appears like pseudomembranous candidiasis without the superficial desquamating layer.

Hyperplastic candidiasis is variable. Usually there is hyperplastic and acanthotic epithelium with parakeratosis. There is an inflammatory cell infiltrate and hyphae are visible. Unlike other forms of candidiasis, hyperplastic candidiasis may show dysplasia.

== Treatment ==
Oral candidiasis can be treated with topical anti-fungal drugs, such as nystatin, miconazole, Gentian violet or amphotericin B. Surgical excision of the lesions may be required in cases that do not respond to anti-fungal medications.

Underlying immunosuppression may be medically manageable once it is identified, and this helps prevent recurrence of candidal infections.

Patients who are immunocompromised, either with HIV/AIDS or as a result of chemotherapy, may require systemic prevention or treatment with oral or intravenous administered anti-fungals. In addition, there is strong evidence that drugs that are absorbed or partially absorbed from the GI tract can prevent candidiasis more effectively than drugs that are not absorbed in the same way.

If candidiasis is secondary to corticosteroid or antibiotic use, then use may be stopped, although this is not always a feasible option. Candidiasis secondary to the use of inhaled steroids may be treated by rinsing out the mouth with water after taking the steroid. Use of a spacer device to reduce the contact with the oral mucosa may greatly reduce the risk of oral candidiasis.

In recurrent oral candidiasis, the use of azole antifungals risks selection and enrichment of drug-resistant strains of candida organisms. Drug resistance is increasingly more common and presents a serious problem in persons who are immunocompromised.

Prophylactic use of antifungals is sometimes employed in persons with HIV disease, during radiotherapy, during immunosuppressive or prolonged antibiotic therapy as the development of candidal infection in these groups may be more serious.

The candidal load in the mouth can be reduced by improving oral hygiene measures, such as regular toothbrushing and use of anti-microbial mouthwashes. Since smoking is associated with many forms of oral candidiasis, cessation may be beneficial.

=== Denture hygiene ===
Good denture hygiene involves regular cleaning of the dentures, and leaving them out of the mouth during sleep. This gives the mucosa a chance to recover, while wearing a denture during sleep is often likened to sleeping in one's shoes. In oral candidiasis, the dentures may act as a reservoir of Candida species known as denture stomatitis which continually reinfects the mucosa once antifungal medication is stopped. Therefore, they must be disinfected as part of the treatment for oral candidiasis. There are commercial denture cleaner preparations for this purpose, but it is readily accomplished by soaking the denture overnight in a 1:10 solution of sodium hypochlorite (Milton, or household bleach). Bleach may corrode metal components, so if the denture contains metal, soaking it twice daily in chlorhexidine solution can be carried out instead. An alternative method of disinfection is to use a 10% solution of acetic acid (vinegar) as an overnight soak, or to microwave the dentures in 200mL water for 3 minutes at 650 watts. Microwave sterilization is only suitable if no metal components are present in the denture. Antifungal medication can also be applied to the fitting surface of the denture before it is put back in the mouth. Other problems with the dentures, such as inadequate occlusal vertical dimension may also need to be corrected in the case of angular cheilitis.

== Prognosis ==
The severity of oral candidiasis is subject to great variability from one person to another and in the same person from one occasion to the next. The prognosis of such infection is usually excellent after the application of topical or systemic treatments. However, oral candidiasis can be recurrent. Individuals continue to be at risk of the condition if underlying factors such as reduced salivary flow rate or immunosuppression are not rectifiable.

Candidiasis can be a marker for underlying disease, so the overall prognosis may also be dependent upon this. For example, a transient erythematous candidiasis that developed after antibiotic therapy usually resolves after antibiotics are stopped (but not always immediately), and therefore carries an excellent prognosis—but candidiasis may occasionally be a sign of more sinister undiagnosed pathology, such as HIV/AIDS or leukemia.

It is possible for candidiasis to spread to/from the mouth, from sites such as the pharynx, esophagus, lungs, liver, anogenital region, skin or the nails. The spread of oral candidiasis to other sites usually occurs in debilitated individuals. It is also possible that candidiasis is spread by sexual contact. Rarely, a superficial candidal infection such as oral candidiasis can cause invasive candidiasis, and even prove fatal. The observation that Candida species are normally harmless commensals on the one hand, but are also occasionally capable of causing fatal invasive candidiases, has led to the description "Dr Jekyll and Mr Hyde".

The role of thrush in the hospital and ventilated patients is not entirely clear, however, there is a theoretical risk of positive interaction of candida with topical bacteria.

== Epidemiology ==
In humans, oral candidiasis is the most common form of candidiasis, by far the most common fungal infection of the mouth, and it also represents the most common opportunistic oral infection in humans with lesions only occurring when the environment favors pathogenic behavior.

Oropharyngeal candidiasis is common during cancer care, and it is a very common oral sign in individuals with HIV. Oral candidiasis occurs in about two thirds of people with concomitant AIDS and esophageal candidiasis.

The incidence of all forms of candidiasis have increased in recent decades. This is due to developments in medicine, with more invasive medical procedures and surgeries, more widespread use of broad spectrum antibiotics and immunosuppression therapies. The HIV/AIDs global pandemic has been the greatest factor in the increased incidence of oral candidiasis since the 1980s. The incidence of candidiasis caused by NCAC species is also increasing, again thought to be due to changes in medical practise (e.g., organ transplantation and use of indwelling catheters).

== History ==
Oral candidiasis has been recognized throughout recorded history. The first description of this condition is thought to have occurred in the 4th century B.C. in "Epidemics" (a treatise that is part of the hippocratic corpus), where descriptions of what sounds like oral candidiasis are stated to occur with severe underlying disease.

The colloquial term "thrush" is of unknown origin but may stem from an unrecorded Old English word *þrusc or from a Scandinavian root. The term is not related to the bird of the same name.

== Society and culture ==
Many pseudoscientific claims by proponents of alternative medicine surround the topic of candidiasis. Oral candidiasis is sometimes presented in this manner as a symptom of a widely prevalent systemic candidiasis, candida hypersensitivity syndrome, yeast allergy, or gastrointestinal candida overgrowth, which are medically unrecognized conditions. (See: Alternative medicine in Candidiasis)

== See also ==
- Vaginitis (or vulvovaginitis)
- Candida albicans
