= Lysine—pyruvate 6-transaminase =

Lysine-pyruvate 6-transaminase

Identifiers
- EC no.: 2.6.1.71
- CAS no.: 114189-79-6

Databases
- IntEnz: IntEnz view
- BRENDA: BRENDA entry
- ExPASy: NiceZyme view
- KEGG: KEGG entry
- MetaCyc: metabolic pathway
- PRIAM: profile
- PDB structures: RCSB PDB PDBe PDBsum
- Gene Ontology: AmiGO / QuickGO
Search
- PMC: articles
- PubMed: articles
- NCBI: proteins

Lysine-pyruvate 6-transaminase (EC 2.6.1.71) is an enzyme that catalyzes the chemical reaction

lysine
+
pyruvic acid
L-allysine
+
alanine

The two substrates of this enzyme characterised from Pichia guilliermondii are L-lysine and pyruvic acid. Its products are L-allysine and L-alanine. This is the first step in the breakdown of lysine in this yeast.

This enzyme is a transferase, specifically a transaminase, which transfer nitrogenous groups. The systematic name of this enzyme class is L-lysine:pyruvate aminotransferase. Other names in common use include lysine-pyruvate aminotransferase, and Lys-AT.
