= CYP52 family =

Group of cytochrome P450 enzymes

Cytochrome P450, family 52, also known as CYP52, is a cytochrome P450 family in fungi participate in the assimilation of alkanes and fatty acids, which the most ancient function was the oxidation of C4-C11 alkanes. The first gene identified in this family is the alkane-inducible cytochrome P450 (P450alk) gene from the yeast Candida tropicalis, with CYP Symbol CYP52A1.
