= John R. Wingard =

American hematologist and oncologist

- Citizenship: American
- Education: Yale University, Johns Hopkins School of Medicine
- Scientific career
- Fields: Hematology, oncology, hematopoietic stem cell transplantation
- Workplaces: University of Florida, Emory University, Johns Hopkins University

John R. Wingard is an American physician-scientist. He is professor emeritus of medicine at the University of Florida College of Medicine, where he directed the Blood and Marrow Transplant Program from 1996 to 2023 and served as deputy director of the UF Health Cancer Center.

He served as president of the American Society for Blood and Marrow Transplantation from 2002 to 2003.

== Education and career ==
Wingard earned a bachelor's degree from Yale University in 1969 and a medical degree from the Johns Hopkins School of Medicine in 1973.

He began his academic career at Johns Hopkins, where he served on the medical faculty from 1979 to 1991. He joined Emory University, directing its Bone Marrow Transplant Program from 1991 to 1996.

In 1996, Wingard joined the University of Florida as professor of medicine and director of its Bone Marrow Transplant Program. He received the Price Eminent Scholar appointment in 2002 and later served as deputy director of the UF Health Cancer Center. He retired in 2023.

His early research examined Candida tropicalis infections in patients with leukemia and the emergence of antifungal-resistant infections associated with fluconazole prophylaxis. He also participated in clinical trials investigating tacrolimus and methotrexate for preventing graft-versus-host disease following transplantation.
