= 2-aminohexanoate transaminase =

Class of enzymes

Identifiers
- EC no.: 2.6.1.67
- CAS no.: 111310-35-1

Databases
- IntEnz: IntEnz view
- BRENDA: BRENDA entry
- ExPASy: NiceZyme view
- KEGG: KEGG entry
- MetaCyc: metabolic pathway
- PRIAM: profile
- PDB structures: RCSB PDB PDBe PDBsum
- Gene Ontology: AmiGO / QuickGO
Search
- PMC: articles
- PubMed: articles
- NCBI: proteins

2-aminohexanoate transaminase (EC 2.6.1.67) is a pyridoxal phosphate-dependent enzyme that catalyzes the chemical reaction

norleucine
+
α-ketoglutaric acid
2-oxohexanoic acid
+
L-glutamic acid

The two substrates of this enzyme characterised from Candida guilliermondii are L-norleucine and α-ketoglutaric acid. Its products are 2-oxohexanoic acid and L-glutamic acid.

This enzyme is a transferase, specifically a transaminase, which transfer nitrogenous groups. The systematic name of this enzyme class is L-2-aminohexanoate:2-oxoglutarate aminotransferase. Other names in common use include norleucine transaminase, norleucine (leucine) aminotransferase, and leucine L-norleucine: 2-oxoglutarate aminotransferase.
