= Bronchomoniliasis =

Infection of the lungs

Bronchomoniliasis is an infection of the lungs caused by Candida albicans or another fungus in the genus Candida. The infection is more likely to be seen in immunocompromised patients or those receiving intensive care.

== See also ==
- Candidiasis
