= Geraldine Butler =

Irish geneticist

Geraldine Butler is a geneticist at University College Dublin. Her research career has mostly been focused on the genetics of fungi. In 2015, she was elected as a member of the Royal Irish Academy.

== Education ==
Butler graduated in 1984 with a BA(mod) in genetics from Trinity College Dublin. On the same year, she began a PhD in genetics at the same institution, which she completed in 1989. She became a lecturer in 1992, a senior lecturer in 2002, an associate professor in 2006, and a full professor in 2012.

== Research ==
One of Butler's research interests is the genetic difference between pathogenic and non-pathogenic Candida species. In 2009, she co-authored a paper in Nature reporting genome sequences of six Candida species and discussing differences between pathogenic and non-pathogenic species.

=== Research funding ===
Butler was one of the signatories of a 2012 letter to The Irish Times from several scientists about the Irish Government funding applied science at the expense of basic science. Butler said that "a lot of us will not have access to funds", and "I am one of the people considering whether I will have to leave Ireland."
