= Median rhomboid glossitis =

- Other names: MRG, Central papillary atrophy, or Glossal central papillary atrophy.
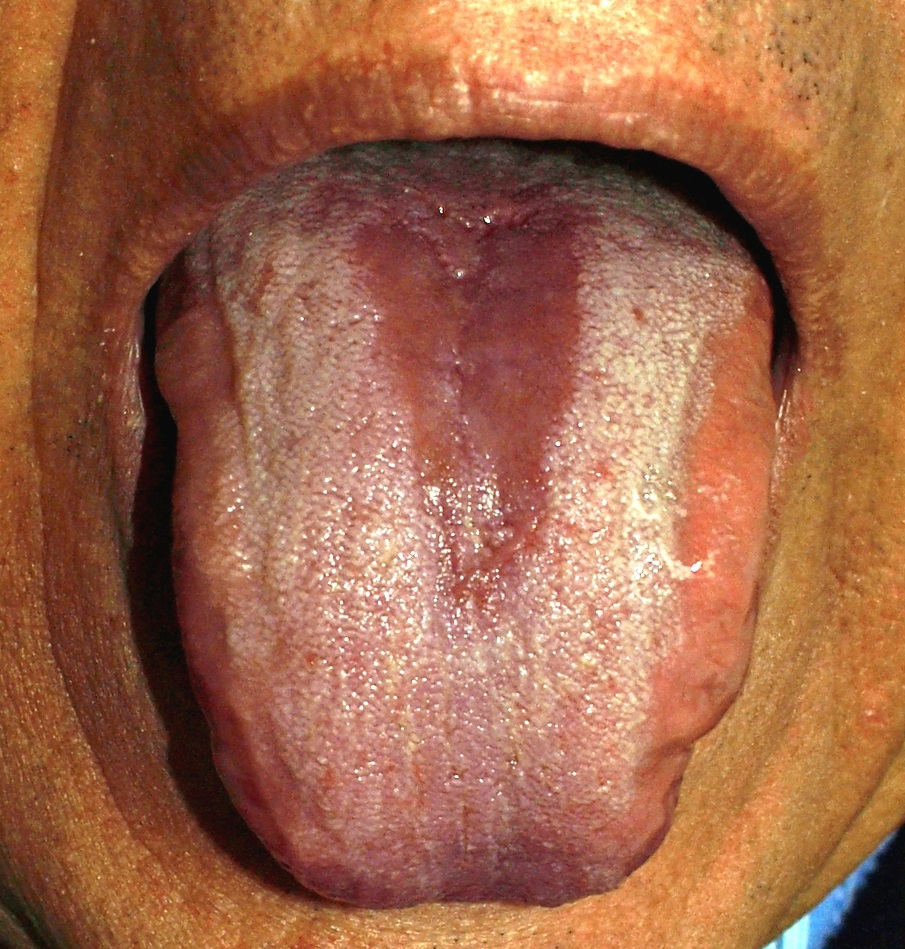
- Median rhomboid glossitis— erythematous (red) and depapillated (smooth) patch of atrophic mucosa in the middle of the dorsal surface of the tongue
- Specialty: Oral medicine

Median rhomboid glossitis is a condition characterized by an area of redness and loss of lingual papillae on the central dorsum of the tongue, sometimes including lesions of the tongue and palate. It is seen in patients using inhaled steroids and smokers, and is usually a kind of chronic atrophic oral candidiasis, but hematinic deficiency and diabetes should be excluded.

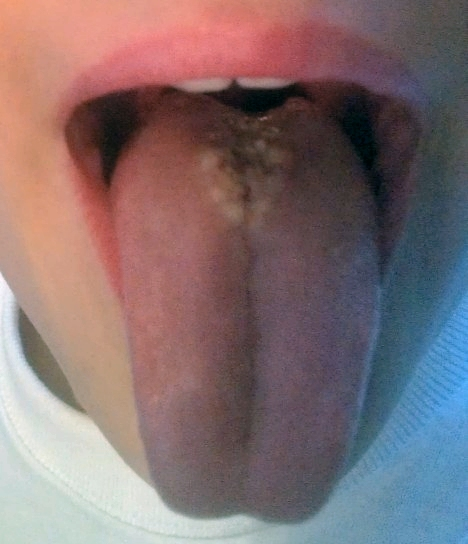
Median rhomboid glossitis in a child. Note atypical appearance of the lesion, which is more commonly an erythematous, atrophic area of depapillation

== Signs and symptoms ==
Rarely is any soreness associated with the condition. Apart from the appearance of the lesion, there are usually no other signs or symptoms. The typical appearance of the lesion is an oval or rhomboid shaped area located in the midline of the dorsal surface of the tongue, just anterior (in front) of the sulcus terminalis. The lesion is usually symmetric, well demarcated, erythematous and depapillated, which has a smooth, shiny surface. Less typically, the lesion may be hyperplastic or lobulated and exophytic. There may be candidal lesions at other sites in the mouth, which may lead to a diagnosis of chronic multifocal oral candidiasis. Sometimes an approximating erythematous lesion is present on the palate as the tongue touches the palate frequently. The lesion is typically 2–3 cm in its longest dimension.

== Causes ==
Predisposing factors include smoking, denture wearing, use of corticosteroid sprays or inhalers and human immunodeficiency virus (HIV) infection. Candida species even in healthy people mainly colonizes the posterior dorsal tongue. Median rhomboid glossitis is thought to be a type of chronic atrophic (or erythematous) candidiasis. Microbiological culture of the lesion usually shows Candida mixed with bacteria.

== Diagnosis ==
The diagnosis is usually made on the clinical appearance, and tissue biopsy is not usually needed. The histologic picture is one of superficial candidal hyphal infiltration and a polymorphonuclear leukocytic inflammatory infiltrate present in the epithelium. The rete ridges are elongated and hyperplastic (pseudoepitheliomatous hyperplasia, which may be mistaken for carcinoma).

== Treatment ==
Treatment may involve smoking cessation and prescription of topical or systemic antifungal medication. Usually the mucosal changes resolve with antifungal therapy, but sometimes the lesion is resistant to complete resolution.

== Epidemiology ==
It is an uncommon condition, occurring with equal prevalence in males and females and at any age.

== History ==
Historically, this lesion was believed to be a developmental defect of the tongue, caused by failure of the tuberculum impar to be covered by the lateral processes of the tongue. This was disproved when a study of 10,000 children were examined and no medium rhomboid glossitis lesions were found at all. Since, a consistent correlation with C. albicans has been demonstrated.
