= Candida bromeliacearum =

Scientific classification
- Domain: Eukaryota
- Kingdom: Fungi
- Division: Ascomycota
- Class: Saccharomycetes
- Order: Saccharomycetales
- Family: Saccharomycetaceae
- Genus: Candida
- Species: C. bromeliacearum

Binomial name
- Candida bromeliacearum Lachance et al. 1999

Species of fungus

Candida bromeliacearum is a yeast species. Its type strain is UNESP 00-103^{T} (=CBS 10002^{T} =NRRL Y-27811^{T}).
