= Christine Marie Berkhout =

Dutch biologist

- Born: 13 July 1893; Malang, Indonesia
- Died: 18 November 1932 (aged 39)
- Education: University of Utrecht
- Occupation: mycologist

Christine Marie Berkhout (13 July 1893 in Malang – 18 November 1932) was a mycologist. She described the genus Candida in her doctoral thesis for the University of Utrecht in the Netherlands in 1923. This event was later described as marking "the beginning of the rational systematics of the anascosporogenous yeasts".

== See also ==
- List of mycologists
