= Candida viswanathii =

Scientific classification
- Kingdom: Fungi
- Division: Ascomycota
- Class: Saccharomycetes
- Order: Saccharomycetales
- Family: Debaryomycetaceae
- Genus: Candida
- Species: C. viswanathii

Binomial name
- Candida viswanathii Sandu & H.S. Randhawa, 1962

Synonyms
- Candida lodderae

Species of fungus

Candida viswanathii is a species of yeast in the genus Candida. It is named after the noted Indian pulmonologist, Raman Viswanathan.

A strain found in oil-contaminated soil near Beijing in 2017 is able to oxidize dodecane into dodecanedioic acid.
