= Candida oleophila =

Scientific classification
- Kingdom: Fungi
- Division: Ascomycota
- Class: Saccharomycetes
- Order: Saccharomycetales
- Family: Debaryomycetaceae
- Genus: Candida
- Species: C. oleophila

Binomial name
- Candida oleophila Montrocher, 1967

Synonyms
- Yarrowia lipolytica

Species of fungus

Candida oleophila is a species of yeast in the genus Candida in the family of Saccharomycetaceae. It is used in post-harvesting fruit and vegetables as an alternative for fungicides.

== Taxonomy ==
Candida oleophila was described by Montrocher in 1967 as the family of Dipodascaceae; in the same year, it was described by Kaisha & Iizuka as a family of Saccharomycetales.

== Description ==
Candida oleophila is a yeast, which is part of Aspire, a product that is used in commercial settings, and is recommended to control postharvest decay of fruit and vegetables. A species of yeast in the genus Candida has a hairpin structure shaped like a dumbbell called SMRTbell. One of the main modes of action is competition for nutrients and space. Also, a major role in the mechanism of action by yeast antagonists is the degradation of enzymes that degrade the fungal wall.

== Habitat and distribution ==
This yeast is commonly found in plants and debris, which are the main natural habitat for most yeast species. Candida oleophila Strain O is a single-celled yeast found naturally on plant tissues (fruits, flowers, and wood) and in water. The exudations, better known as plant secretions, contain sugars and other compounds that help the nutrition of yeasts, better known as epiphytes.

== Bioactive compounds ==
According to Siobhán A. Turner and Geraldine Butler, in conjunction with L Mikhailova of the Department of Morphology of Microorganisms and Electron Microscopy Institute of Microbiology, Bulgarian Academy of Sciences says: Candida olephila shows complex bioactive compounds, which are the primary basis of the benefit of the fruits after the post-harvest. Penicillium cell wall fragments and glucose stimulate the production of these three compounds. One main study on Candida oleophila showed that it could produce and secrete several cell wall-degrading enzymes; this includes compounds like exo-β-1,3-glucanase, protease, and chitinase. Exo-β-1,3-glucanase and chitinase could be produced in the early stages of growth, followed by protease reaching growth in a range of a week, approximately 6 to 8 days. This demonstrated that Candida oleophila could secrete exo-β-1,3-glucanase(CoEXG1) on the wound site of the fruit that was the subject of study for this experiment. These studies were also made based on in vitro in which they showed a proliferation of compounds made to fruits to test how the biocontrol activity on pathogen infection worked in a controlled setting.

== Geographical distribution ==
Candida oleophila is found everywhere where biocontrol agents are needed to control post-harvest diseases of fruits and vegetables. Studies on prolonging the life of postharvest fruits and vegetables with Candida oleophila have concluded that biocontrol with C. oleophila can be used over fungicides. The fungicides used to maintain food control in agricultural areas, such as fruits and vegetables, are widely used, but a person is exposed for any reason, it can irritate the eyes and skin and cause harm if ingested.

== Aspect of fungus ==
Candida oleophila has previously been used in the laboratory. Together with the active agent I-182 from Candida oleophila, it was engineered as an active agent for commercial products such as Aspire. It is used for the central postharvest handling inside fruits, such as apples and pears, to control the growth of pathogenic fungi, such as the gray mold (Botrytis cinerea) and blue mold (Penicillium expansum). This helps to avoid losses in postharvest supplies, which leads to monetary losses for farmers.

== Growth rate ==
How the growth of Candida oleophila in wound samples can be characterized is reflected in the ability to compete against pathogens that could damage the nutrition and space of the fruit or vegetable. Candida oleophila showed a rapid expansion observed on the third day of healing in the fruit or vegetable. Candida oleophila could show slow growth for approximately 3 to 7 days. The number of Candida oleophila yeast cells could reach a maximum growth average of 2.2 × 1011 CFU mL−1, which was 20.3 times higher than on day 0; later, the number of yeast decrease quickly. In the end, Candida oleophila reached a 5.3 × 107 CFU mL−1 on day 28, 1/18 of the amount present on day 0. C. oleophilia can colonize wounds and multiply rapidly on the surface of the injury, healing the tissue. At the same time, with rapid growth, losses and infections that could damage another postharvest can be avoided, reducing economic losses.

== Sources ==
- “Biopesticides Fact Sheet for Candida Oleophila Strain O - US EPA.” Accessed March 25, 2023.
- Sui, Yuan, Michael Wisniewski, Samir Droby, Edoardo Piombo, Xuehong Wu, and Junyang Yue. “Genome Sequence, Assembly, and Characterization of the Antagonistic Yeast Candida Oleophila Used as a Biocontrol Agent against Post-Harvest Diseases.” Frontiers. Frontiers, February 10, 2020.
- Zheng X;Jiang H;Silvy EM;Zhao S;Chai X;Wang B;Li Z;Bi Y;Prusky D; “Candida Oleophila Proliferated and Accelerated Accumulation of Suberin Poly Phenolic and Lignin at Wound Sites of Potato Tubers.” Foods (Basel, Switzerland). U.S. National Library of Medicine. Accessed March 25, 2023.
- “Massive Isolation of Anamorphous Ascomycete Yeasts Candida Oleophila ” Accessed March 25, 2023
- “Characterization of Extracellular Lytic Enzymes Produced by the Yeast Biocontrol Agent Candida Oleophila.” Federal Register: Request Access. Accessed April 21, 2023.
- Zheng, F, Weiwei Zhang, Yuan Sui, Ruihan Ding, Wenfu Yi, Yuanyuan Hu, Hongsheng, Liu, andChunyu Zhu. “Sugar Protectants Improve the Thermotolerance and Biocontrol Efficacy of the Biocontrol Yeast, Candida Oleophila.” Frontiers in microbiology. U.S. National Library of Medicine, February 8, 2019.
- Turner, Siobhán A, and Geraldine Butler.“The Candida Pathogenic Species Complex” Cold Spring Harbor perspectives in medicine. U.S. National Library of Medicine, September 2, 2014.
- “Potential Health Effects of Pesticides.” Penn State Extension. Accessed April 17, 2023.
- Kurtzman, Cletus P. “Yarrowia Van Der Walt & Von Arx (1980).” The Yeasts, 2011, 927–29.
