= Candida theae =

Scientific classification
- Domain: Eukaryota
- Kingdom: Fungi
- Division: Ascomycota
- Class: Saccharomycetes
- Order: Saccharomycetales
- Family: Saccharomycetaceae
- Genus: Candida
- Species: C. theae

Binomial name
- Candida theae C.-F.Lee

Species of fungus

Candida theae Mycological characteristics
- Lacks a stipe
- Ecology is saprotrophic
- Edibility is choice

Candida theae is a species of yeast in the genus Candida. The species name means "tea". It was first isolated from Indonesian tea drinks and in Quito from clay pots that contained chicha dating from 680 CE.
