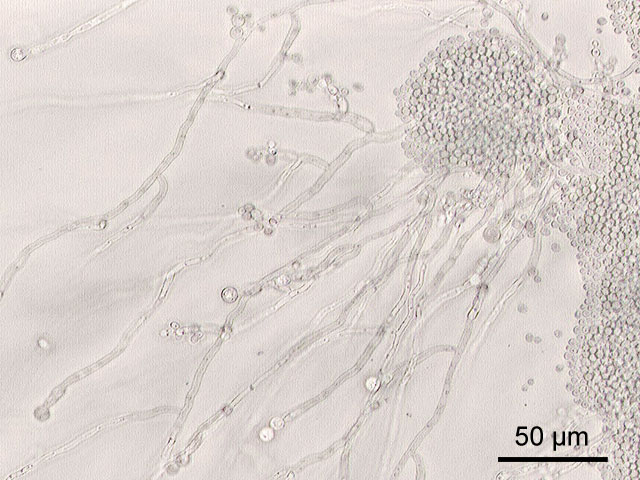
- Candida albicans at 200× magnification

Scientific classification
- Kingdom: Fungi
- Division: Ascomycota
- Subdivision: Saccharomycotina
- Class: Saccharomycetes
- Order: Saccharomycetales
- Family: Debaryomycetaceae
- Genus: Candida; Berkh. (1923)

Type species
- Candida vulgaris Berkh. (1923)

= Candida (fungus) =

Genus of ascomycete fungi

Candida is a genus of yeasts. It is the most common cause of fungal infections worldwide and the largest genus of medically important yeasts.

The genus Candida encompasses about 200 species. Many species are harmless commensals or endosymbionts of hosts including humans. When mucosal barriers are disrupted or the immune system is compromised, however, they can invade and cause disease, known as an opportunistic infection. Candida is located on most mucosal surfaces and mainly the gastrointestinal tract, along with the skin. Candida albicans is one of the most commonly isolated species and can cause infections (candidiasis or thrush) in humans and other animals. In winemaking, some species of Candida can potentially spoil wines.

Many species are found in gut flora, including C. albicans in mammalian hosts, whereas others live as endosymbionts in insects. Systemic infections of the bloodstream and major organs (candidemia or invasive candidiasis), particularly in patients with an impaired immune system (immunocompromised), affect over 90,000 people a year in the US.

The genome of several Candida species has been sequenced.

Antibiotics promote yeast (fungal) infections, including gastrointestinal (GI) Candida overgrowth and penetration of the GI mucosa. While women are more susceptible to genital yeast infections, men can also be infected. Certain factors, such as prolonged antibiotic use, increase the risk for both men and women. People with diabetes or the immunocompromised, such as those infected with HIV, are more susceptible to yeast infections.

Candida antarctica and Candida rugosa are a source of industrially important lipases, while Candida krusei is prominently used to ferment cacao during chocolate production. Lipases from Candida rugosa are also used to digest fats in laboratory assays because of their broad range of activity.

== Biology ==
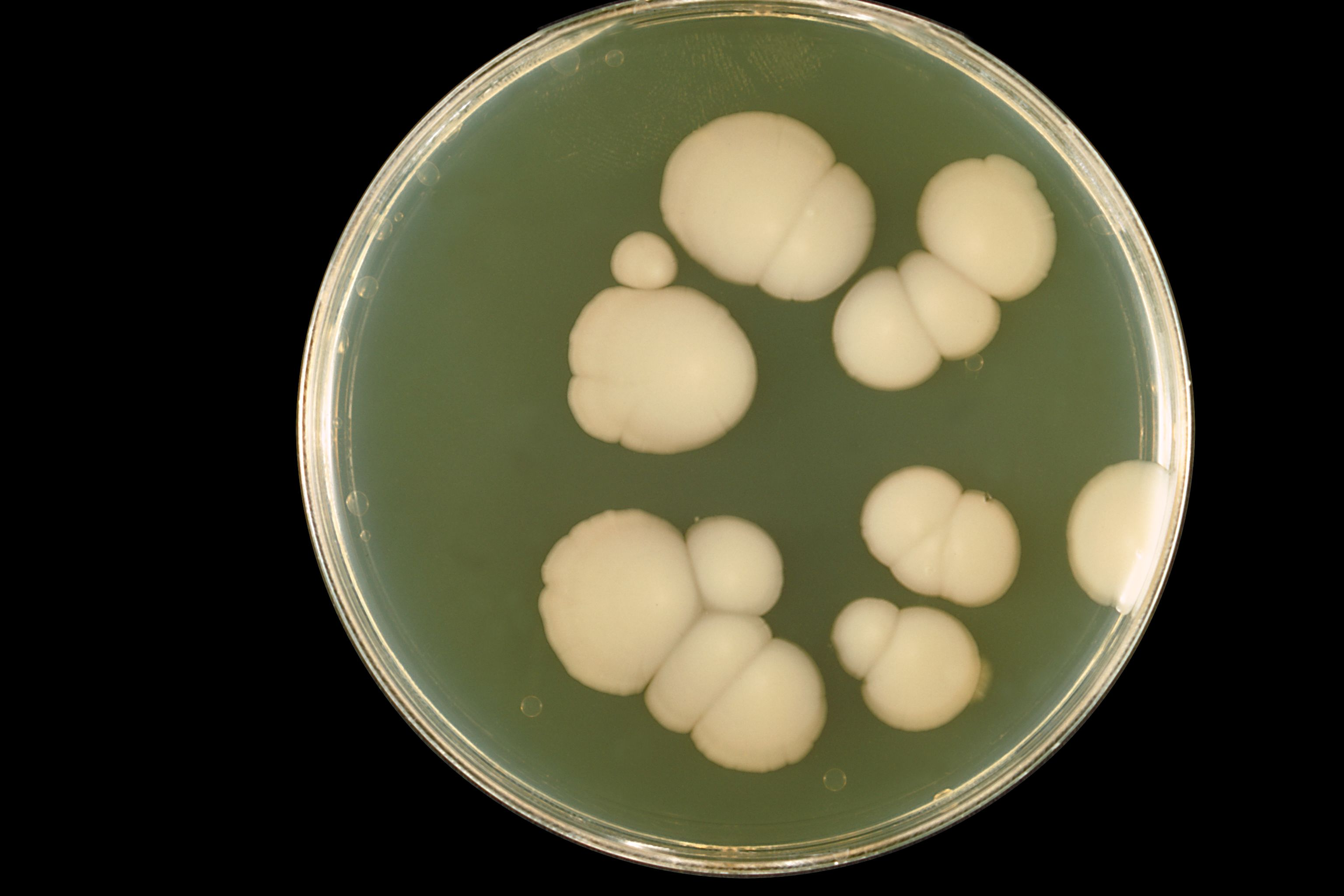
Agar plate culture of C. albicans

When grown in a laboratory, Candida appears as large, round, white or cream (albicans means "whitish" in Latin) colonies, which emit a yeasty odor on agar plates at room temperature. C. albicans ferments glucose and maltose to acid and gas, sucrose to acid, and does not ferment lactose, which helps to distinguish it from other Candida species.

Recent molecular phylogenetic studies show that the genus Candida, as currently defined, is extremely polyphyletic (encompassing distantly-related species that do not form a natural group). Before the advent of inexpensive molecular methods, yeasts that were isolated from infected patients were often called Candida without clear evidence of relationship to other Candida species. For example, Candida glabrata, Candida guilliermondii, and Candida lusitaniae are clearly misclassified and will be placed in other genera once phylogenetic reorganization is complete (for example, see Khunnamwong et al. 2015).

Some species of Candida use a non-standard genetic code in the translation of their nuclear genes into the amino acid sequences of polypeptides. The difference in the genetic code between species possessing this alternative code is that the codon CUG (normally encoding the amino acid leucine) is translated by the yeast as a different amino acid, serine. The alternative translation of the CUG codon in these species is due to a novel nucleic acid sequence in the serine-tRNA (ser-tRNACAG), which has a guanosine located at position 33, 5' to the anticodon. In all other tRNAs, this position is normally occupied by a pyrimidine (often uridine). This genetic code change is the only such known alteration in cytoplasmic mRNA, in both the prokaryotes, and the eukaryotes, involving the reassignment of a sense codon. This novel genetic code may be a mechanism for more rapid adaptation to the organism's environment, as well as playing an important role in the evolution of the genus Candida by creating genetic barriers that encouraged speciation.

== Pathogen ==
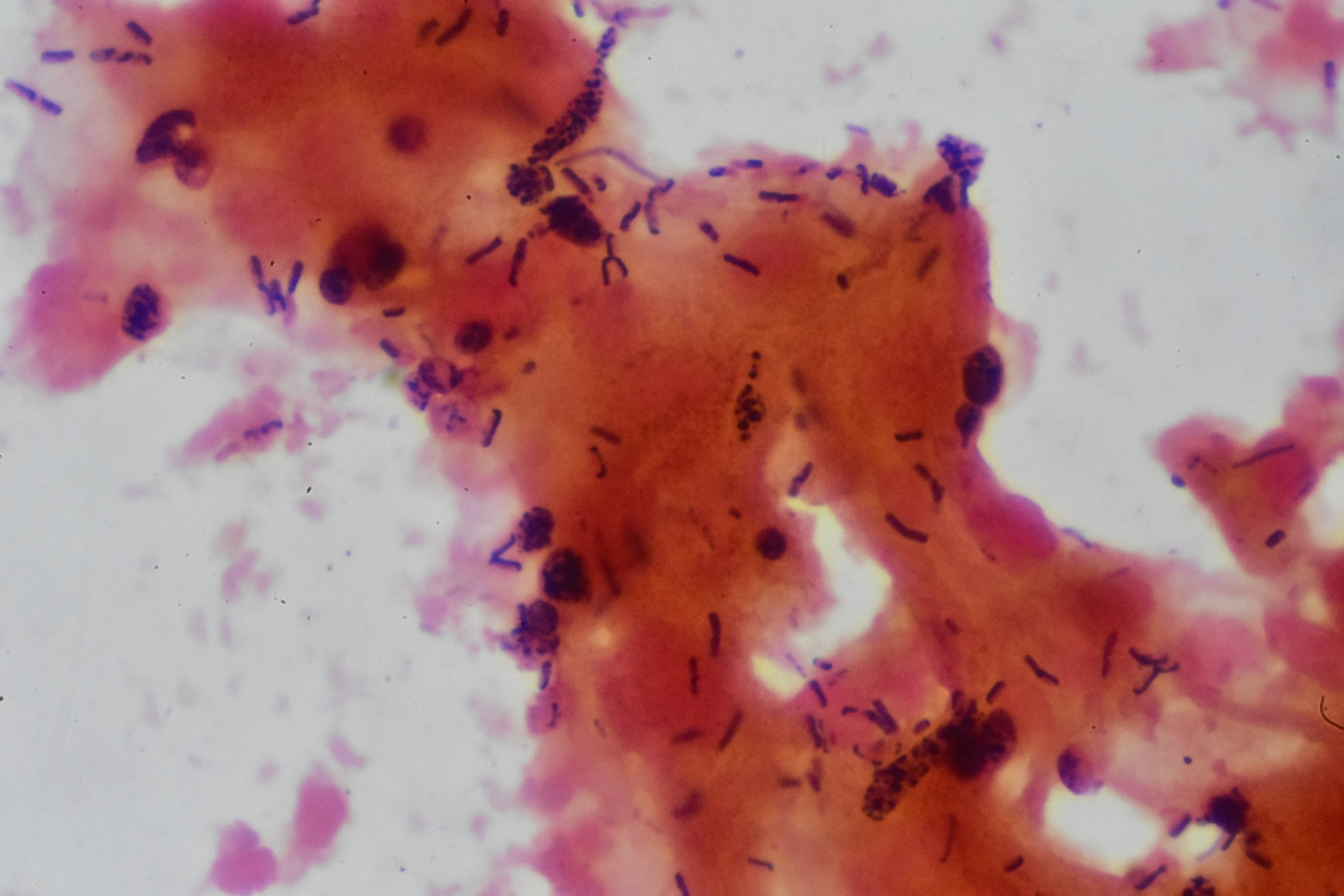
Candida spores in a vaginal swab. (Gram stain)

Candida are almost universal in low numbers on healthy adult skin and C. albicans is part of the normal flora of the mucous membranes of the respiratory, gastrointestinal and female genital tracts. The dryness of skin compared to other tissues prevents the growth of the fungus, but damaged skin or skin in intertriginous regions is more amenable to rapid growth. A severe consequence of candida infection can be esophageal cancer, overgrowth with candida in the esophagus is the most important risk factor for developing esophageal cancer in patients with achalasia.

Overgrowth of several species, including C. albicans, can cause infections ranging from superficial, such as oropharyngeal candidiasis (thrush) or vulvovaginal candidiasis (vaginal candidiasis) and subpreputial candidiasis, which may cause balanitis, to systemic, such as fungemia and invasive candidiasis. Oral candidiasis is common in elderly denture-wearers. In otherwise healthy individuals, these superficial infections can be cured with topical or systemic antifungal medications (commonly over-the-counter antifungal treatments like miconazole or clotrimazole). In debilitated or immunocompromised patients, or if introduced intravenously (into the bloodstream), candidiasis may become a systemic disease producing abscesses, thrombophlebitis, endocarditis, or infections of the eyes or other organs. Typically, relatively severe neutropenia (low neutrophils) is a prerequisite for Candida to pass through the defenses of the skin and cause disease in deeper tissues; in such cases, mechanical disruption of the infected skin sites is typically a factor in the fungal invasion of the deeper tissues. The most common way to treat invasive candida infections is with the use of amphotericin or fluconazole; other methods would include surgery.

== Applications ==
C. albicans has been used in combination with carbon nanotubes (CNT) to produce stable electrically conductive bio-nano-composite tissue materials that have been used as temperature-sensing elements.

== Species ==
Among Candida species, C. albicans, which is a normal constituent of the human flora, a commensal of the skin and the gastrointestinal and genitourinary tracts, is responsible for the majority of Candida bloodstream infections (candidemia). Yet, there is an increasing incidence of infections caused by C. glabrata and C. rugosa, which could be because they are frequently less susceptible to the currently used azole-group of antifungals. Other medically important species include C. parapsilosis, C. tropicalis, and C. dubliniensis.

Other Candida species, such as C. oleophila, have been used as biological control agents in fruit.

- C. albicans
- C. ascalaphidarum
- C. amphixiae
- C. argentea
- C. atlantica
- C. atmosphaerica
- C. blankii
- C. blattae
- C. boidinii
- C. bromeliacearum
- C. carpophila
- C. carvajalis
- C. cerambycidarum
- C. chauliodes
- C. corydali
- C. crusei
- C. dosseyi
- C. dubliniensis
- C. ergatensis
- C. fructus
- C. fermentati
- C. insectamens
- C. insectorum
- C. intermedia
- C. jeffresii
- C. keroseneae
- C. lipolytica
- C. lyxosophila
- C. maltosa
- C. membranifaciens
- C. oleophila
- C. oregonensis
- C. parapsilosis
- C. quercitrusa
- C. rugosa
- C. sake
- C. shehatea
- C. temnochilae
- C. tenuis
- C. theae
- C. tropicalis
- C. tsuchiyae
- C. sinolaborantium
- C. sojae
- C. subhashii
- C. viswanathii
