= Blastospore =

Asexual reproductive spore in fungi

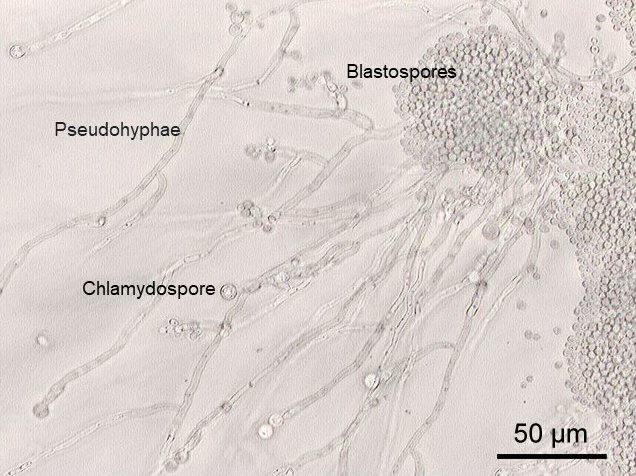
blastospore and other structures of Candida albicans

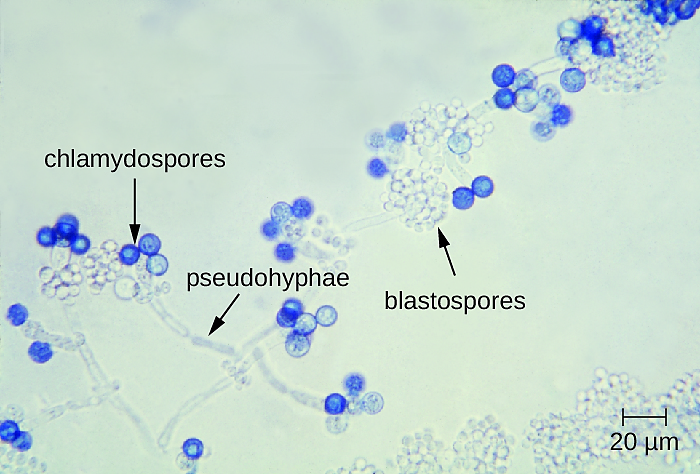
Candida pseudohyphae, chlamydospores and blastospores

A blastospore is an asexual reproductive spore produced by budding, commonly found in fungi within the division Glomeromycota. The word blastospore is derived from the Greek blastós ('sprout', 'bud', or 'germ') and sporá ('spore').

== In Candida albicans ==
Candida albicans, a well-known example of a fungus that forms blastospores, is an opportunistic pathogen in humans. It typically resides harmlessly in the skin, mouth, and gut, but can cause infections when the immune system is compromised. This species is capable of producing both blastospores and pseudohyphae, allowing it to adapt to varying environmental conditions. The ability of C. albicans to form biofilms, particularly on medical devices, presents considerable challenges in clinical settings. Biofilms are structured communities of fungi, predominantly made up of blastospores and hyphae, which adhere to surfaces and demonstrate increased resistance to antifungal treatments compared to planktonic cells.

The cell wall of Candida albicans blastospores consists of multiple layers, each contributing to the spore's structural integrity. These layers are composed of various polysaccharides, which are needed for the spore's ability to survive in different environments. The outermost layer, rich in mannoproteins, plays a major role in interactions between the fungus and its host, affecting immune recognition and pathogenicity.

== Other fungi ==
Beyond Candida albicans, other fungi also utilise blastospore formation as a reproductive strategy. The entomopathogenic (insect-disease causing) Beauveria bassiana produces blastospores as part of its life cycle. These spores are vital for the fungus's survival and pathogenicity, especially under nutrient-limited conditions. The endogenous reserves within these spores, such as lipids and carbohydrates, influence their viability and ability to germinate and infect host organisms. Other examples of fungi that reproduce asexually using blastospores include yeasts in the genus Candida (which now includes many species formerly classified as Torulopsis), Kloeckera species (the anamorph form of Hanseniaspora), and the asexual fungi Cladosporium, Geotrichum, and Monilinia.
