= Hematinic =

Nutrient needed for production of blood cells

A hematinic is a nutrient required for the formation of blood cells in the process of hematopoiesis. The main hematinics are iron, vitamin B_{12}, and folate. Deficiency in hematinics can lead to anaemia. In cases of hematinic deficiency, hematinics can be administered as medicines, in order to increase the hemoglobin content of the blood.

Erythropoietin (EPO) is a hormone that stimulates erythropoiesis, which can also be given as a medicine to increase the hemoglobin content of the blood, but EPO is not classified as a hematinic as it is not considered a nutrient, but a hormone.
