= Intertriginous =

Bodily region where two skin areas may rub together

In medicine, an intertriginous area is where two skin areas may touch or rub together. Examples of intertriginous areas are the axilla of the arm, the anogenital region, skin folds of the breasts and between digits. Intertriginous areas are known to harbor large amounts of aerobic cocci and aerobic coryneform bacteria, which are both parts of normal skin flora.

== See also ==
- Intertrigo

== Bibliography ==
- Leyden J. Pathophysiology of certain bacterial diseases. In: Soter N, Baden H, eds. Pathophysiology of Dermatologic diseases. New York: McGraw-Hill, 1991:427-51
