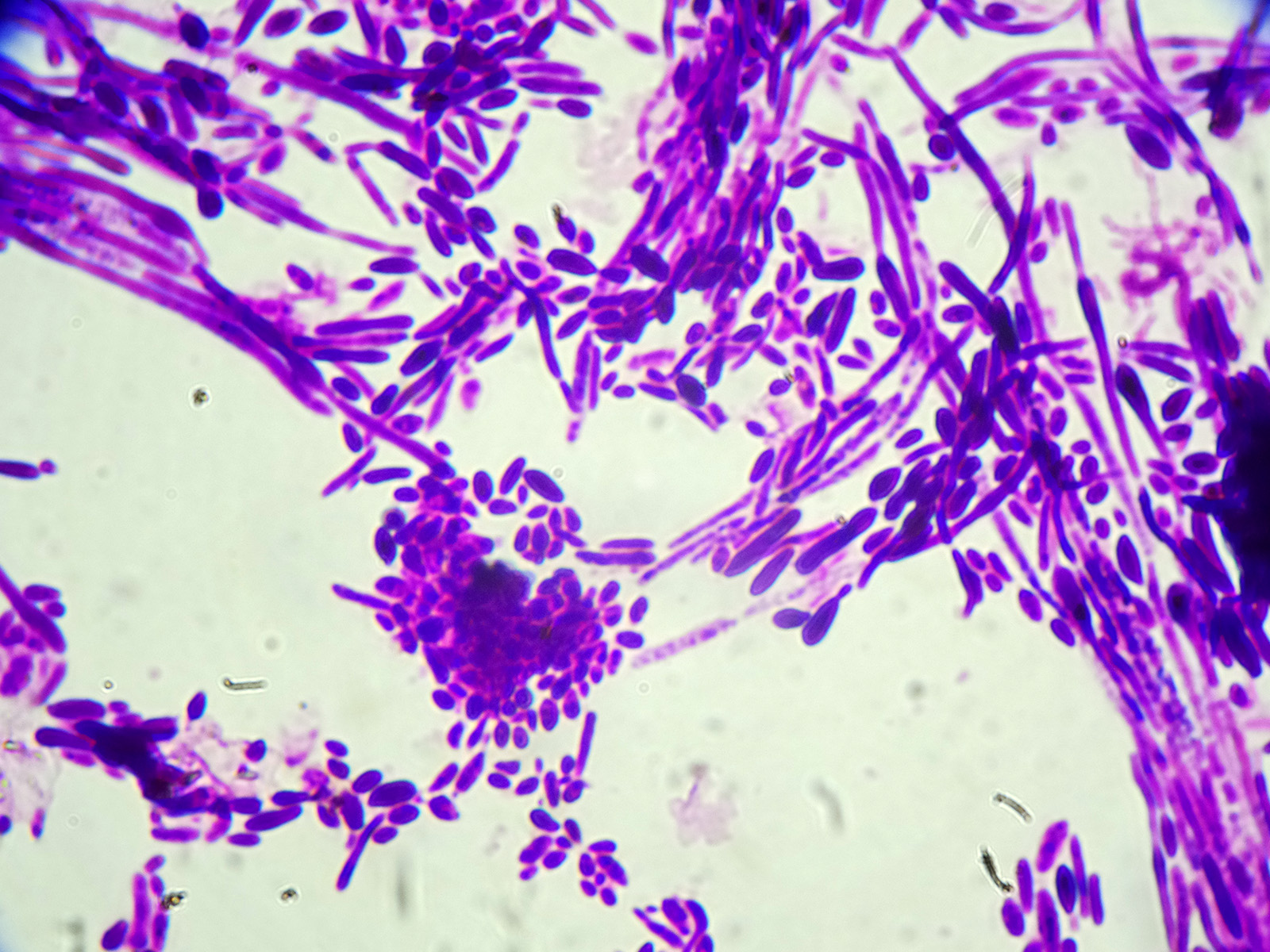
- Gram stain of Candida dubliniensis cells (1000-fold magnification)

Scientific classification
- Domain: Eukaryota
- Kingdom: Fungi
- Division: Ascomycota
- Class: Saccharomycetes
- Order: Saccharomycetales
- Family: Saccharomycetaceae
- Genus: Candida
- Species: C. dubliniensis

Binomial name
- Candida dubliniensis Sullivan et al. (1995)

= Candida dubliniensis =

Species of fungus

Candida dubliniensis is a fungal opportunistic pathogen originally isolated from AIDS patients. It is also occasionally isolated from immunocompetent individuals. It is of the genus Candida, very closely related to Candida albicans but forming a distinct phylogenetic cluster in DNA fingerprinting. It is most commonly isolated from oral cavities, and is also occasionally found in other anatomical sites.

== Prevalence and epidemiology ==
Candida dubliniensis is cosmopolitan (found around the world), and has been described as a separate species in 1995. Retrospective studies have shown that previously it had been commonly identified as Candida albicans, with which C. dubliniensis is closely related and shares a number of characteristics.

One test for distinguishing C. dubliniensis from C. albicans, is laboratory culture of the organism at 42 °C. Most C. albicans strains grow at this temperature, whereas most C. dubliniensis isolates do not. There are also significant differences in the conditions that lead to the formation of chlamydospores between C. albicans and C. dubliniensis, although they are otherwise phenotypically very similar.

The Memorial Sloan-Kettering Cancer Center conducted several studies, both retrospective and prospective. In 974 germ-tube positive yeasts, 22 isolates (2.3%) from 16 patients were C. dubliniensis. All individuals were immunologically compromised with either malignancy or AIDS, and the isolates came from a variety of different sites. C. dubliniensis was also isolated from the mouths of 18% of patients with diabetes and who use insulin.

== Antifungal susceptibility ==
In one study, all 20 C. dubliniensis isolates tested were susceptible to itraconazole, ketoconazole and amphotericin B.

=== Fluconazole ===
Many isolates of C. dubliniensis are sensitive to fluconazole. In one study, sixteen of twenty isolates were sensitive to fluconazole, while four were resistant. It has been hypothesized that C. dubliniensis possesses the ability to rapidly develop resistance to fluconazole, especially in patients on long-term therapy.
