= Meyerozyma guilliermondii =

Scientific classification
- Kingdom: Fungi
- Division: Ascomycota
- Class: Pichiomycetes
- Order: Serinales
- Family: Debaryomycetaceae
- Genus: Meyerozyma
- Species: M. guilliermondii

Binomial name
- Meyerozyma guilliermondii Wick; Kurtzman et al.

Synonyms
- Candida guilliermondii; Pichia guilliermondii

Species of fungus

Meyerozyma guilliermondii (formerly known as Pichia guilliermondii until its rename in 2010) is a species of yeast of the genus Meyerozyma whose asexual or anamorphic form is known as Candida guilliermondii.

Candida guilliermondii has been isolated from numerous human infections, mostly of cutaneous origin, if only from immunosuppressed patients. C. guilliermondii has also been isolated from normal skin and in seawater, feces of animals, fig wasps, buttermilk, leather, fish, and beer.

== Morphology ==
Candida guilliermondii colonies are flat, moist, smooth, and cream to yellow in color on Sabouraud dextrose agar. It does not grow on the surface when inoculated into Sabouraud broth.

When grown on cornmeal-Tween 80 agar at 25 °C for 72 hours, C. guillermondii produces clusters of small blastospores along its pseudohyphae, especially at septal points. Pseudohyphae are short and few in number.
