= Mycotypha microspora =

Scientific classification
- Kingdom: Fungi
- Division: Mucoromycota
- Class: Mucoromycetes
- Order: Mucorales
- Family: Mycotyphaceae
- Genus: Mycotypha
- Species: M. microspora

Binomial name
- Mycotypha microspora Fenner

Synonyms
- Microtypha microspora (Fenner) Monte, Oddo & Tonolo

Species of fungus

Mycotypha microspora, also known as Microtypha microspora, is a filamentous fungus in the division Zygomycota. It was discovered in a Citrus aurantium peel in 1932 by E. Aline Fenner, who proposed a new genus Mycotypha to accommodate it. Mycotypha africana, which is another species in the genus Mycotypha, is closely related to M. microspora. The fungus has subsequently been isolated from both outdoor and indoor settings around the world, and is typically found in soil and dung. The species rarely causes infections in humans, but has recently been involved in the clinical manifestation of the life-threatening disease mucormycosis.

== Morphology and growth conditions ==
Mycotypha microspora is a filamentous fungus whose genus name is derived from the cattail-like appearance of its fructifications and tiny spores. It has a dense granular protoplasm and is composed of several hyphae and vacuoles. The structure is highly branched, with mycelium of varying diameters. It consists of two kinds of unispored sporangia: an inner layer containing globose spores and an outer layer with obovoid or cylindrical spores.

During the growth period, the fruiting body is coenocytic. After the fungus gradually matures, septation occurs at approximately the same time as sporulation. Mycotypha microspora colonies grow rapidly and abundantly on nutrient-rich media, such as carrot agar and potato dextrose. However, no growth occurs on low pH media. M. microspora is mesophilic, with optimal growth of cultures occurring at a temperature of 35 °C (95 °F), with a threshold of 10 °C (50 °F) under which growth is inhibited. The fructifications typically form at night and thus respond unfavourably to light.

== Geographical distribution and habitat ==
Other species present in the genus Mycotypha include M. africana, and M. indica. These species are distributed worldwide and have been geographically collected from countries including Japan, India, Finland, Zimbabwe, and certain states in the U.S. such as Arizona, Washington D.C., Kansas, California, and Iowa. These fungi are predominantly found in soil and faeces. M. microspora was initially extracted from a Citrus aurantium peel in the Netherlands, where it was found to be pathogenic. Additionally, it has reportedly been found in decaying wood and a hospital washroom in Germany. One specific case noted its presence in stool samples from a child with leukaemia.

Mycotypha microspora is an intestinal symbiont of the silverfish species Thermobia domestica. Deposited with the feces of the silverfish, the fungus was found to be responsible for arrestment and aggregation behaviour in Thermobia domestica and in the related silverfish Ctenolepisma longicaudata, but not in Lepisma saccharina. Thermobia domestica does not seem to sense the presence of M. microspora itself, but rather the fungus' metabolites (such as glucose) of its enzymatic digestion of cellulose.

== Pathogenicity ==
Only a few reported cases exist where the species has been found to cause an infection in humans. M. microspora has recently been implicated as a causative factor in the pathogenesis of gastrointestinal mucormycosis in humans, which is a rare disease caused by fungi of the order Mucorales. Mucormycosis is a potentially fatal disease characterised by tissue necrosis that results from aggressive infiltration of blood vessels and subsequent formation of blood clots. The disease develops due to the binding of spore coating (CotH) proteins from the fungus to glucose regulator protein 78 (GRP78) host receptors in endothelial cells. Tissue necrosis blocks the entry of antifungals to infected sites, therefore preventing clearance and promoting circulation of the disease. Mucormycosis is highly susceptible in immunocompromised patients, and can mainly infect the body at pulmonary, rhinocerebral, cutaneous, and gastrointestinal sites. Factors that put an individual at risk for manifestation of the disease include corticosteroid use, diabetes, and ongoing neutropenia.

== Treatment ==
Given that the disease is rare, there is a lack of experimental findings assessing the efficacy of specific treatment regimens for mucormycosis. The most reliable antifungal agent against mucormycosis is amphotericin, however the use of this in combination with voriconazole led to acute kidney injury upon admission of a 41-year-old man who was dually infected by Aspergillus fumigatus and M. microspora. In order to prevent permanent kidney damage, therapy was switched to administering the broad spectrum antifungal isavuconazole for 15 days, however this also led to complications in the patient. Ultimately, his gastrointestinal Mycotypha infection was treated with a combination of posaconazole and micafungin, which proved to be more effective than monotherapy, and he was eventually cured of the disease by surgically removing a part of his stomach in order to manage the gastrointestinal bleeding. This rare case provides some insight into potential treatment protocols for M. microspora and A. fumigatus infections in humans, however, further research that focuses on infections caused solely by M. microspora is essential in formulating a specific treatment regimen against this species.

CotH proteins are found in fungi of the order Mucorales, and blocking their function weakens their ability to invade endothelial cells, and reduces mucormycosis presentation in mice.
