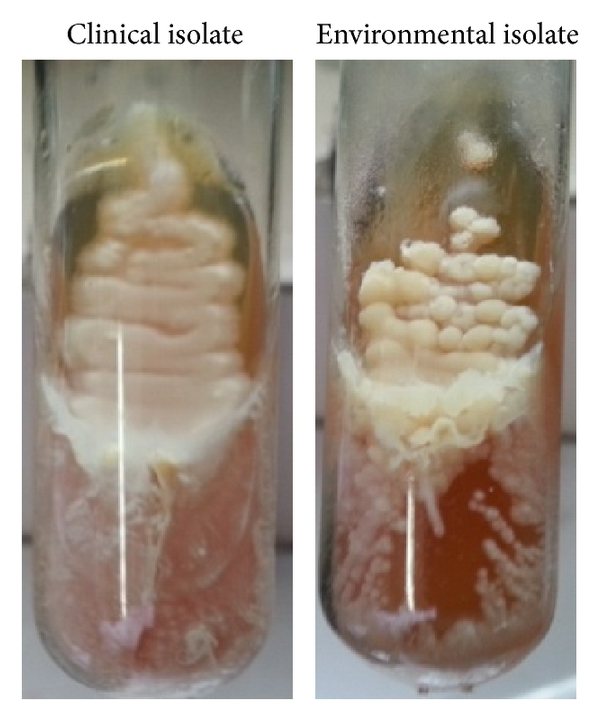
- Pichia kudriavzevii growth on Sabouraud dextrose agar

Scientific classification
- Kingdom: Fungi
- Division: Ascomycota
- Class: Pichiomycetes
- Order: Pichiales
- Family: Pichiaceae
- Genus: Pichia
- Species: P. kudriavzevii

Binomial name
- Pichia kudriavzevii Boidin, Pignal & Besson (1965)

Synonyms
- Candida brassicae Amano; Candida krusei (Castell.) Berkhout (1923)

= Pichia kudriavzevii =

Species of fungus

Pichia kudriavzevii (formerly Candida krusei) is a budding yeast (a species of fungus) involved in chocolate production. P. kudriavzevii is an emerging fungal nosocomial pathogen primarily found in the immunocompromised and those with hematological malignancies. It has natural resistance to fluconazole, a standard antifungal agent. It is most often found in patients who have had prior fluconazole exposure, sparking debate and conflicting evidence as to whether fluconazole should be used prophylactically. Mortality due to P. kudriavzevii fungemia is much higher than the more common C. albicans. Other Candida species that also fit this profile are C. parapsilosis, C. glabrata, C. tropicalis, C. guillermondii and C. rugosa.

P. kudriavzevii can be successfully treated with voriconazole, amphotericin B, and echinocandins (micafungin, caspofungin, and anidulafungin).

== Role in chocolate production ==
Cacao beans have to be fermented to remove the bitter taste and break them down. This takes place with two fungi: P. kudriavzevii and Geotrichum. Most of the time, the two fungi are already present on the seed pods and seeds of the cacao plant, but specific strains are used in modern chocolate making. Each chocolate company uses its own strains, which have been selected to provide optimum flavor and aroma to the chocolate. The yeasts produce enzymes to break down the pulp on the outside of the beans and generate acetic acid, killing the cacao embryo inside the seed, developing a chocolatey aroma and eliminating the bitterness in the beans.

== Growth and metabolism ==
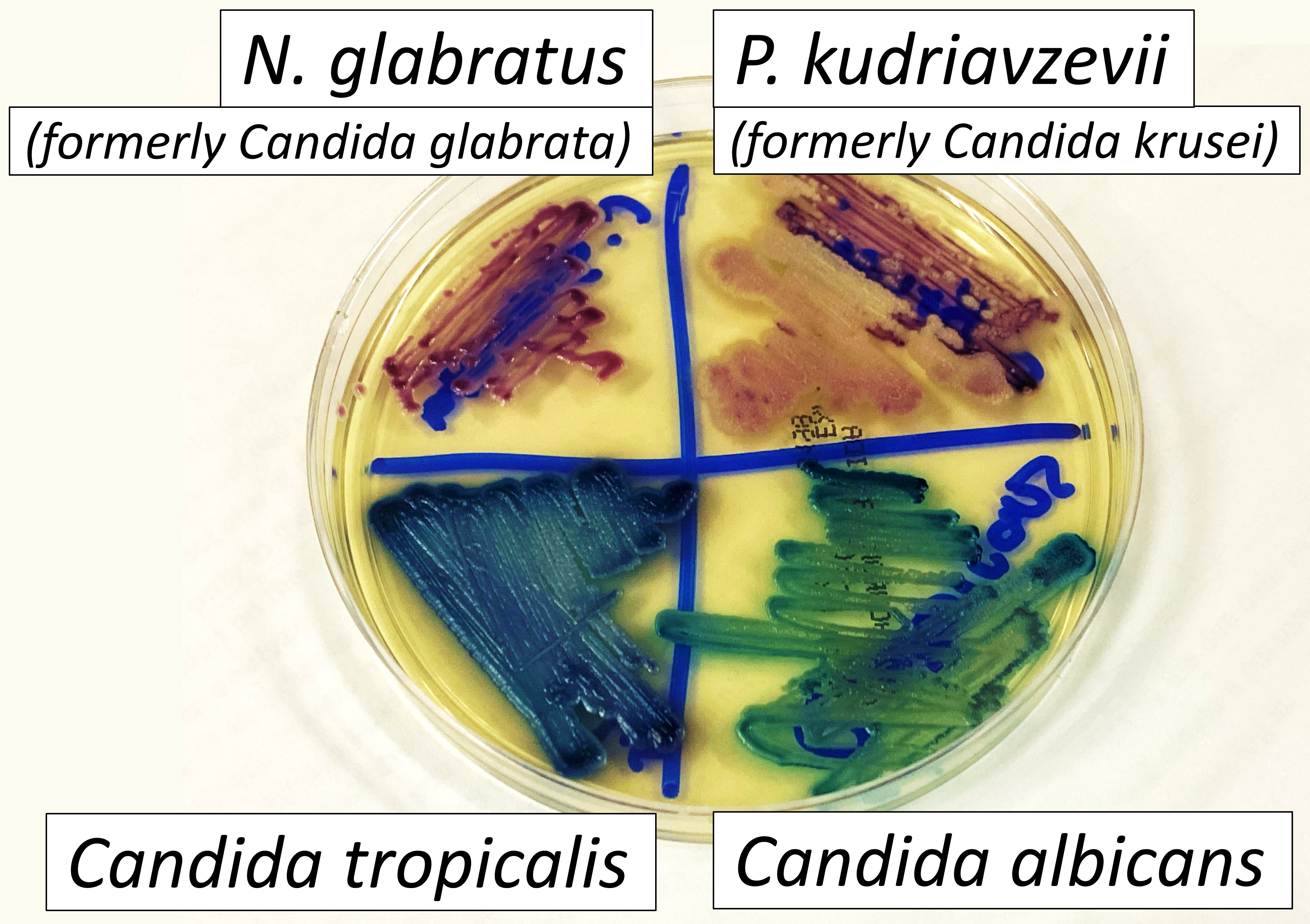
Chromogenic agar can help in indicating P. kudriavzevii infection versus some similar fungi. (CHROMAgar shown)

P. kudriavzevii grows best at a temperature of 43–45 °C (109–113 °F). Other Candida species are a major differential diagnosis and these generally require biotin for growth and some have additional vitamin requirements, but P. kudriavzevii can grow in vitamin-free media. Also, P. kudriavzevii grows on Sabouraud's dextrose agar as spreading colonies with a matte or a rough whitish-yellow surface, in contrast to the convex colonies of Candida spp. This characteristic, together with its "long grain rice" appearance on microscopy, helps the definitive identification of the species.
