= Mycotyphaceae =

Scientific classification
- Kingdom: Fungi
- Division: Mucoromycota
- Class: Mucoromycetes
- Order: Mucorales
- Family: Mycotyphaceae; Benny & R.K. Benj. (1985)

Type genus
- Mycotypha Fenner

Family of fungi

The Mycotyphaceae are a family of fungi in the order Mucorales. Members of this family, rarely reported, are thought to be more common in warmer climates.

== Description ==
Species in this family have sporangiola borne on dehiscent pedicels.

== Systematics ==
The family comprises a single genus with three species:

- Mycotypha africana Novak & Backus, 1963
- Mycotypha indica P.M. Kirk & Benny, 1985
- Mycotypha microspora Fenner, 1932 (generic type species)
