= Carrot medium =

Type of agar medium

Carrot medium is a kind of growth medium made from a mixture of agar and carrot powder.

Carrot medium is used to cultivate the spore of Phytophthora sojae. Phytophthora sojae causes soybean blight (Phytophthora root rot of soybeans). Soybean blight can affect the output and quality of soybeans seriously. The spore of phytophthora sojae is difficult to culture in potato dextrose agar; it is generally cultured by V8 medium and lima bean agar at home and abroad. Carrot medium can cultivate, separate, reproduce and conserve many kinds spore of phytophthora sojae, but it is not suitable for cultivating the pathogen of potato late blight.
