= Toxemia =

Toxemia may refer to:

- Bloodstream infection
- an outdated medical term for pre-eclampsia
