= V8 medium =

V8 medium is a kind of agar medium which is used to cultivate the spore of Phytophthora sojae. Phytophthora sojae causes soybean blight (Phytophthora root rot of soybeans). Soybean blight can affect the output and quality of soybeans seriously. The spore of phytophthora sojae is difficult to culture in potato dextrose agar; it is generally cultured by V8 medium and lima bean agar at home and abroad. V8 medium can cultivate, separate, reproduce and conserve many kinds spore of phytophthora sojae, but it is not suitable for cultivating the pathogen of potato late blight.
