= Esophageal candidiasis =

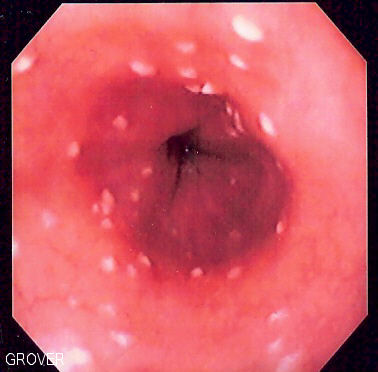
- Endoscopic image of esophageal candidiasis in a patient after chemotherapy. Brushings confirmed the presence of hyphae
- Specialty: Infectious diseases

Esophageal candidiasis is an opportunistic infection of the esophagus by Candida albicans. The disease usually occurs in patients in immunocompromised states, including post-chemotherapy and in AIDS. However, it can also occur in patients with no predisposing risk factors, and is more likely to be asymptomatic in those patients. It is also known as candidal esophagitis or monilial esophagitis.

== Signs and symptoms ==
People with esophageal candidiasis typically present with difficult or painful swallowing. Longstanding esophageal candidiasis can result in weight loss. There is often concomitant thrush in the mouth.

Some patients present with esophageal candidiasis as a first presentation of systemic candidiasis.

== Diagnosis ==
In most cases, the diagnosis is established based on response to therapy. Patients in whom esophageal candidiasis is suspected should receive a brief course of antifungal therapy with fluconazole. If the infection resolves after treatment with fluconazole, then the diagnosis of esophageal candidiasis is made and no further investigation is needed. However, if the infection persists or if there are other factors involved which may warrant further investigation, then patient will undergo an esophagogastroduodenoscopy if it is safe to do so. Endoscopy often reveals classic diffuse raised plaques that characteristically can be removed from the mucosa by the endoscope. Brushing or biopsy of the plaques shows yeast and pseudohyphae by histology that are characteristic of Candida species.

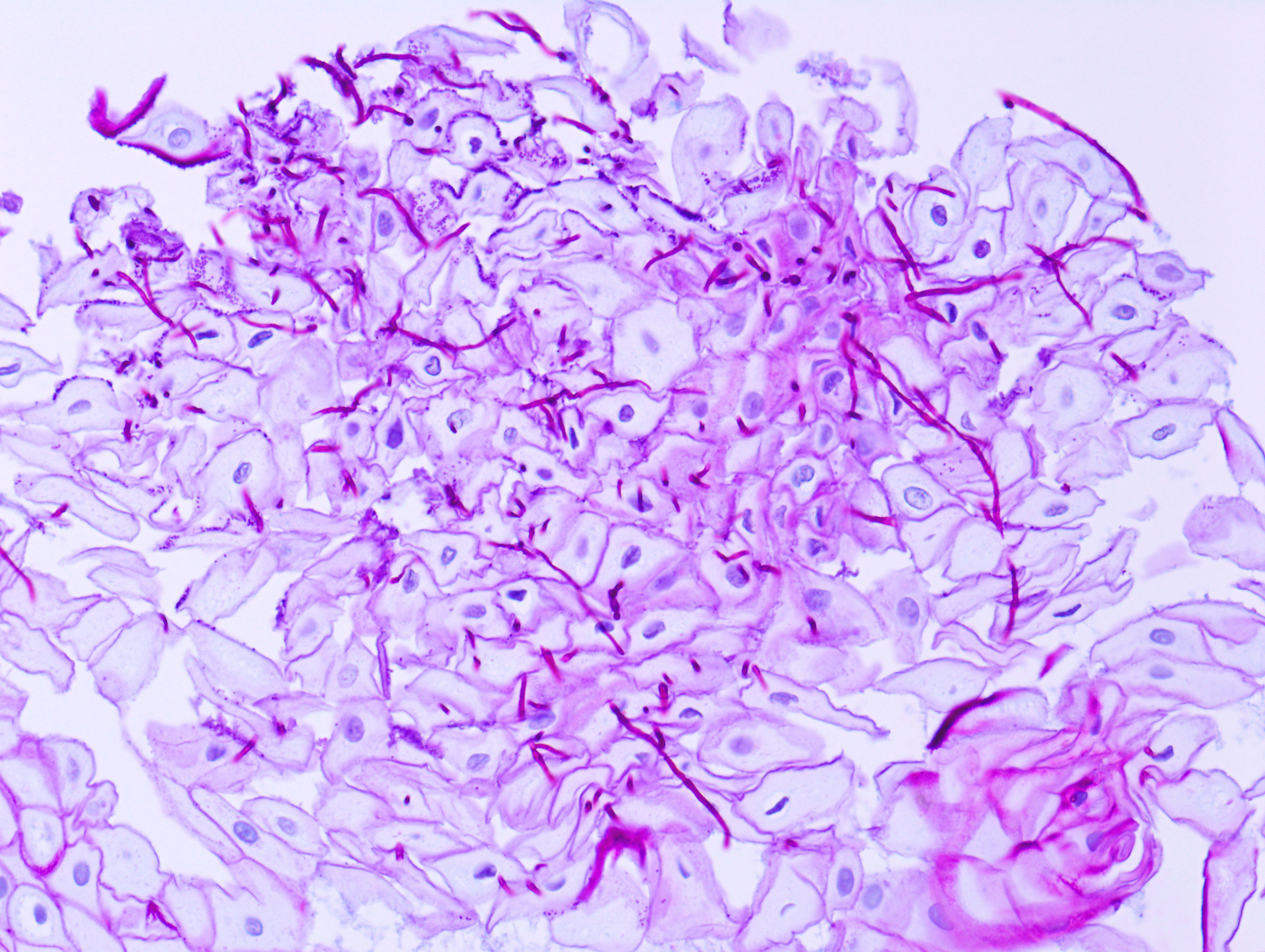

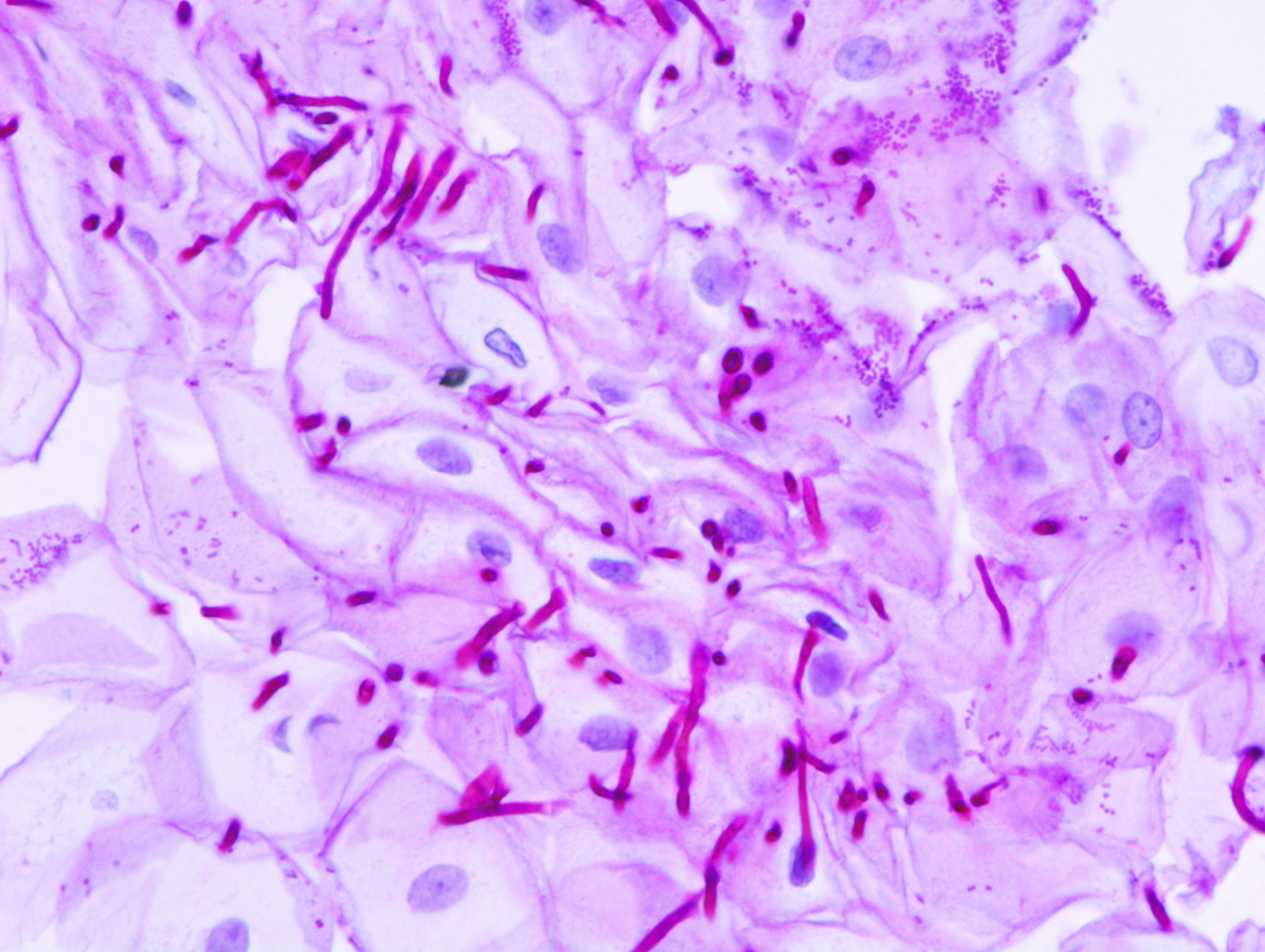

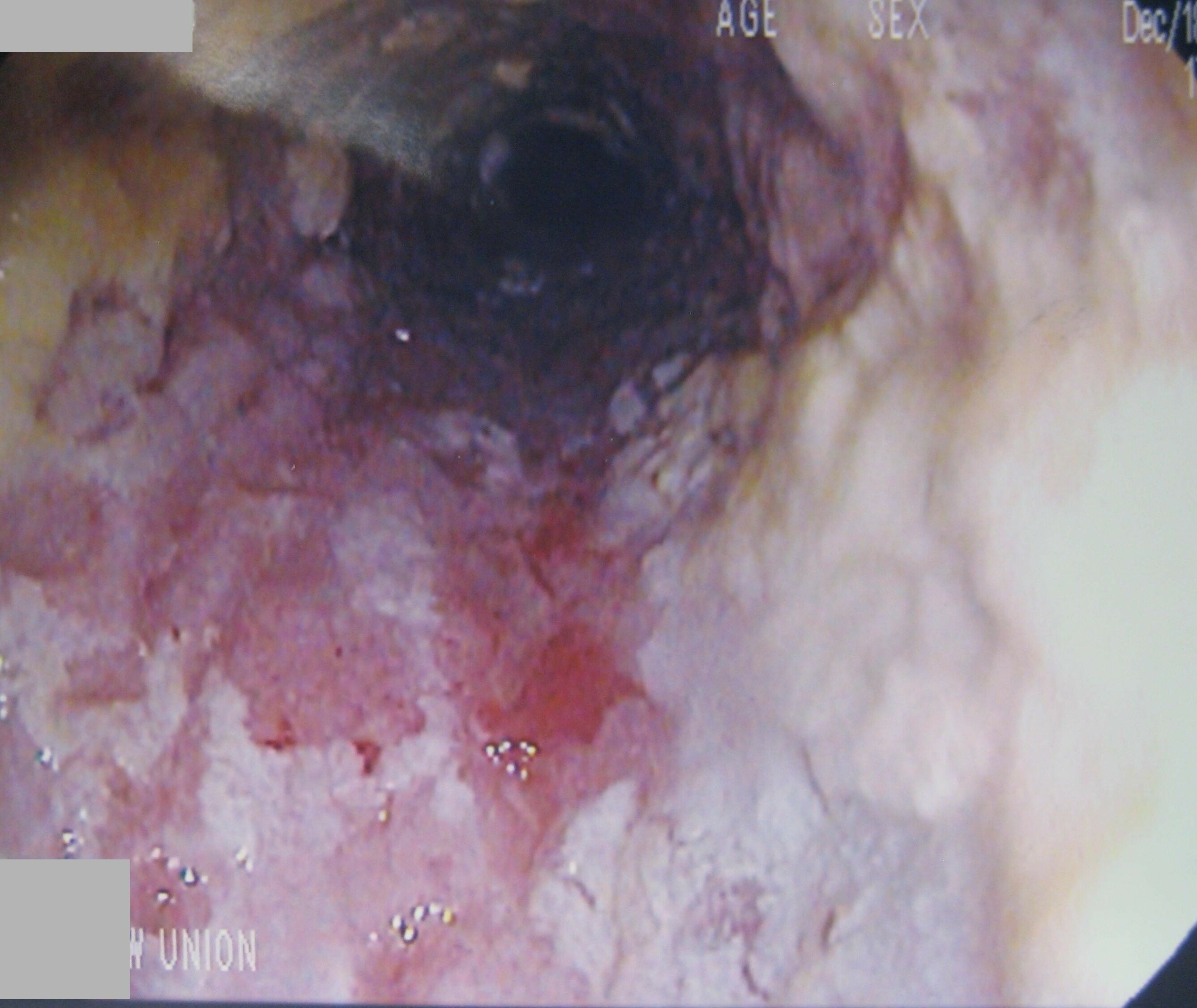
A severe case of candidiasis

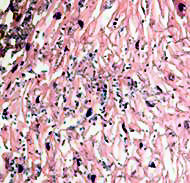
H&E stain of esophagus showing Candida hyphae within the lamina propria

== Treatment ==
The current first-line treatment is fluconazole, 200 mg on the first day, followed by daily dosing of 100 mg for at least 21 days total. Treatment should continue for 14 days after relief of symptoms. Other therapy options include:

- Nystatin is an effective treatment for mild esophageal candidiasis. It can be used as (swish, do not swallow) treatment for oral candidiasis that occurs with the use of asthma pumps.
- Suspected cases of esophageal candidiasis should be treated with short-term fluconazole antifungal therapy. When symptoms recover after therapy, we can diagnosis esophageal candidiasis and do not need more investigations. Oral fluconazole is most commonly used medication for esophageal candidiasis. For patients who cannot tolerate oral medication, IV fluconazole can be used alternatively.
- Other oral triazoles, such as itraconazole and voriconazole can be other options.
- Amphotericin B can be used in nonresponsive cases, but should not be used routinely due to its serious side effects.
- Posaconazole is effective in severe and refractory esophageal candidiasis.
