= Lima bean agar =

Agar medium used to cultivate Phytophthora sojae

Lima bean agar (LBA) is an agar medium which is used to cultivate the spores of Phytophthora sojae. Phytophthora sojae causes soybean blight (Phytophthora root rot of soybeans). Soybean blight can affect the output and quality of soybeans seriously. The spore of Phytophthora sojae is difficult to culture in potato dextrose agar; it is generally cultured by lima bean agar and carrot agar. Lima bean agar can cultivate, separate, reproduce and conserve many types of Phytophthora sojae spores, but it is not suitable for cultivating the pathogen of potato late blight.
