= Antibiotic prophylaxis =

Prevention of infections using antibiotics

Antibiotic prophylaxis refers to, for humans, the prevention of infection complications using antimicrobial therapy (most commonly antibiotics). Antibiotic prophylaxis in domestic animal feed mixes has been employed in America since at least 1970.

== For humans ==
Antibiotic prophylaxis is most commonly used prior to dental surgery, but may be used in other cases, such as surgery or prior to sexual intercourse for patients who suffer from recurrent urinary tract infections.

Even when sterile techniques are adhered to, surgical procedures can introduce bacteria and other microbes in the blood (causing bacteremia), which can colonize and infect different parts of the body. For surgery, prophylactic antibiotic treatment mainly reduces superficial infections at the site of surgical incisions; it is less effective at preventing deep infections. For example, if someone is having emergency surgery for a damaged bowel, antibiotics will have a bigger effect on preventing an infection at or near the skin rather than preventing an infection deep in the abdomen or preventing lung or bladder infections.

Antibiotics can be effective in reducing the occurrence of some infections. Patients should be selected for prophylaxis if the medical condition or the surgical procedure is associated with a considerable risk of infection or if a postoperative infection would pose a serious hazard to the patient's recovery and well-being. Antibiotics also cause unwanted side effects, such as antibiotic-associated diarrhea, so selection for purely preventive reasons needs to consider both advantages and disadvantages.

Antibiotic prophylaxis is also commonly used to prevent respiratory tract infections in immunocompromised patients.

=== Microbial infections and related diseases ===
Local wound infections (superficial or deep-sided), urinary tract infections (caused by a bladder catheter inserted for surgery), and pneumonia (due to impaired breathing/coughing, caused by sedation and analgesics during the first few hours of recovery) may endanger the health of patients after surgery. Visibly worse are postoperative bacterial infections at the site of implanted foreign bodies (sutures, osteosynthetic material, joint replacements, pacemaker implants, etc.) Often, the outcome of the procedure may be put into question and the life of the patient may even be put at risk.

Worldwide experience with antimicrobial prophylaxis in surgery has proven to be effective and cost-efficient, both avoiding severe patient suffering while saving lives (provided the appropriate antibiotics have been carefully chosen and used to the best of current medical knowledge).

=== Antibiotic selection ===
A proper regimen of antibiotics for perioperative prophylaxis of septic complications decreases the total amount of antimicrobials needed and eases the burden on hospitals. The choice of antibiotics should be made according to data on pharmacology, microbiology, clinical experience and economy. Drugs should be selected with a reasonable spectrum of activity against pathogens likely to be encountered, and antibiotics should be chosen with kinetics that will ensure adequate serum and tissue levels throughout the risk period. Depending on the type of surgery and anticipated contamination associated with it, combinations of different agents or different routes of administration (e.g. intravenous and oral antibiotics) might be beneficial in reducing perioperative adverse events.

For prophylaxis in surgery, only antibiotics with good tolerability should be used. Cephalosporins remain the preferred drugs for perioperative prophylaxis due to their low toxicity. Parenteral systemic antibiotics seem to be more appropriate than oral or topical antibiotics because the chosen antibiotics must reach high concentrations at all sites of danger. Broad-spectrum antibiotics are more likely to prevent gram-negative sepsis. New data demonstrate that third-generation cephalosporins are more effective than first- and second-generation cephalosporins if all perioperative infectious complications are taken into consideration.

Dermatologic surgeons commonly use antibiotic prophylaxis to prevent bacterial endocarditis. Based on previous studies, though, the risk of endocarditis following cutaneous surgery is low and thus the use of antibiotic prophylaxis is controversial. Although this practice is appropriate for high-risk patients when skin is contaminated, it is not recommended for non-eroded, non-infected skin.

There are many factors that affect physicians' compliance with guideline recommendations, including cultural factors, educational background, training, nurse and pharmacist influences, medication supply, and logistics.

The American Dental Association (ADA) recommends antibiotic prophylaxis for few people since only a small number of cases of endocarditis might be caused by dental procedures.

=== Advantages of long-acting antibiotics ===
Long-acting, broad-spectrum antibiotics offer the following advantages by comparison to short-acting antimicrobials in perioperative prophylaxis:

- A single dose covers the whole perioperative risk period - even if the operation is delayed or long-lasting - and with regard to respiratory and urinary tract infections
- Repeat administrations for prophylaxis are not necessary, so that additional doses are less likely to be forgotten (an advantage of practical value in a busy working situation such as a hospital)
- Less risk of development of resistance and less side effects
- Increased compliance and reduced errors of administration
- Possibly better-effectiveness (less material and labor cost, less septic perioperative complications)

There are many factors that affect physicians' compliance with guideline recommendations, including cultural factors, educational background, training, nurse and pharmacist influences, medication supply, and logistics.

=== American Heart Association recommendations ===
The American Heart Association (AHA) now recommends antibiotic prophylaxis for very few patients since only a small number of cases of endocarditis might be prevented by this procedure.

== For livestock ==
Antibiotic prophylaxis in domestic animal feed mixes has been employed in America since at least 1970. Over time, the use of antibiotics for growth promotion purposes in livestock was discovered. In 1986, some European countries banned the use of antibiotics because of research they found that linked antibiotic use in livestock and drug resistant bacteria in humans. The European Union regulated in 2006 against antibiotics for growth promotion purposes.

It was estimated in 2014 that over 80% of the world's antibiotic use was on farms. Coccidiosis in fowl had evolved increased tolerance to the antibiotic feed. The WHO warned in April 2014 that farm use was a contributor to superbugs in humans. The Auditor General of Canada found lack of progress in 2014 on antimicrobial resistance despite three years of government funds that should have been used to implement a reduction programme. A CBC writer was concerned that there was in Canada "no coordinated national system to control antibiotics in agriculture."

Due to the serious problem of superbugs (which are bred in antibiotic-rich environments) the Food and Drug Administration issued a guidance document in December 2013. The chief public health officer of Canada said four months later that "antibiotics should only be used in animals to treat infection rather than guard against disease or promote growth." The Canadian guidance document calls for "the prudent use of antibiotics in animal agriculture and a gradual phasing out of growth promoting drugs in feed and water over the three years" ending in 2017. Producers will no longer be allowed to continuously feed animals doses of antibiotics as a way to promote growth. A veterinarian said that ""If you don't put (antibiotics) in the feed, and you wait until you get an outbreak of necrotic enteritis, you've got a lot of dead birds and you've lost a lot of money." The Beef Cattle Research Council were irritated by the change, while the Chicken Farmers of Canada had pre-empted it by teamwork four years earlier. However, concerns were raised by the Chief Veterinarian of Ontario that "In other jurisdictions, they've found that, the drugs are not used for growth promotion, wink, wink, they're used for disease prevention."

As of 2016, Health Canada had approved for employment in cattle three natural hormones and three synthetic hormones.
