= Bloodstream infection =

Bacterial or fungal infection of blood

Bloodstream infections
- Other names: Blood infection, toxemia, bacteremia, septicemia
- Specialty: Infectious diseases

Bloodstream infections (BSIs) are infections of blood caused by blood-borne pathogens. The detection of microbes in the blood (most commonly accomplished by blood cultures) is always abnormal. A bloodstream infection is different from sepsis, which is characterized by severe inflammatory or immune responses of the host organism to pathogens.

Bacteria can enter the bloodstream as a severe complication of infections (like pneumonia or meningitis), during surgery (especially when involving mucous membranes such as the gastrointestinal tract), or due to catheters and other foreign bodies entering the arteries or veins (including during intravenous drug abuse). Transient bacteremia can result after dental procedures or brushing of teeth.

Bacteremia can have several important health consequences. Immune responses to the bacteria can cause sepsis and septic shock, which, particularly if severe sepsis and then septic shock occurs, have high mortality rates, especially if not treated quickly (though, if treated early, currently mild sepsis can usually be dealt with successfully). Bacteria can also spread via the blood to other parts of the body (which is called hematogenous spread), causing infections away from the original site of infection, such as endocarditis or osteomyelitis. Treatment for bacteremia is with antibiotics, and prevention with antibiotic prophylaxis can be given in high risk situations.

== Signs and symptoms ==
Low-grade bacteremia is typically transient and is quickly removed from the blood by the immune system.

Bacteremia frequently evokes a response from the immune system called sepsis, which consists of symptoms such as fever, chills, and hypotension. Severe immune responses to bacteremia may result in septic shock and multiple organ dysfunction syndrome, which are potentially fatal.

== Types ==
Based on type of causative microbe, bloodstream infections are of many types:

Type of blood-borne infection	Causative microbe	Description	Examples
Bacteremias	Bacteria	Bacteremia, in the strictest sense, refers to presence of viable bacteria in the blood. Asymptomatic bacteremia can occur in normal daily activities such as conducting oral hygiene and after minor medical procedures. In a healthy person, these clinically benign infections are transient and cause no further sequelae. However, when immune response mechanisms fail or become overwhelmed, bacteremia becomes a bloodstream infection that can evolve into many clinical spectrums and is differentiated as septicemia.	Meningitis, pneumonia, syphilis, brucellosis, endocarditis
Viremias	Viruses	Viremia is a medical condition where viruses enter the bloodstream and hence have access to the rest of the body. It is similar to bacteremia, a condition where bacteria enter the bloodstream. The name comes from combining the word "virus" with the Greek word for "blood" (haima). It usually lasts for 4 to 5 days in the primary condition.	HIV-AIDS, Ebola, hepatitis B, hepatitis C
Fungemias	Fungi	Fungemia is the presence of fungi or yeasts in the blood. The most common type, also known as candidemia, candedemia, or systemic candidiasis, is caused by Candida species; candidemia is also among the most common bloodstream infections of any kind. Infections by other fungi, including Saccharomyces, Aspergillus (as in aspergillemia, also called invasive aspergillosis) and Cryptococcus, are also called fungemia. It is most commonly seen in immunosuppressed or immunocompromised patients with severe neutropenia, cancer patients, or in patients with intravenous catheters.	Candidemia, aspergillemia (invasive aspergillosis)
Protozoemia (blood-borne protozoal infections)	Protozoa	Protozoan infections are parasitic diseases caused by organisms formerly classified in the kingdom Protozoa. These organisms are now classified in the supergroups Excavata, Amoebozoa, Harosa (SAR supergroup), and Archaeplastida. They are usually contracted by either an insect vector or by contact with an infected substance or surface.	Malaria, giardia, toxoplasmosis, babesiosis, trypanosomiasis, leishmaniasis

== Causes ==
Bacteria can enter the bloodstream in a number of different ways. However, for each major classification of bacteria (gram negative, gram positive, or anaerobic) there are characteristic sources or routes of entry into the bloodstream that lead to bacteremia. Causes of bacteremia can additionally be divided into healthcare-associated (acquired during the process of receiving care in a healthcare facility) or community-acquired (acquired outside of a health facility, often prior to hospitalization).

=== Gram positive bacteremia ===
Gram positive bacteria are an increasingly important cause of bacteremia. Staphylococcus, streptococcus, and enterococcus species are the most important and most common species of gram-positive bacteria that can enter the bloodstream. These bacteria are normally found on the skin or in the gastrointestinal tract.

Staphylococcus aureus is the most common cause of healthcare-associated bacteremia in North and South America and is also an important cause of community-acquired bacteremia. Skin ulceration or wounds, respiratory tract infections, and IV drug use are the most important causes of community-acquired staph aureus bacteremia. In healthcare settings, intravenous catheters, urinary tract catheters, and surgical procedures are the most common causes of staph aureus bacteremia.

There are many different types of streptococcal species that can cause bacteremia. Group A streptococcus (GAS) typically causes bacteremia from skin and soft tissue infections. Group B streptococcus is an important cause of bacteremia in neonates, often immediately following birth. Viridans streptococci species are normal bacterial flora of the mouth. Viridans strep can cause temporary bacteremia after eating, toothbrushing, or flossing. More severe bacteremia can occur following dental procedures or in patients receiving chemotherapy. Finally, Streptococcus bovis is a common cause of bacteremia in patients with colon cancer.

Enterococci are an important cause of healthcare-associated bacteremia. These bacteria commonly live in the gastrointestinal tract and female genital tract. Intravenous catheters, urinary tract infections and surgical wounds are all risk factors for developing bacteremia from enterococcal species. Resistant enterococcal species can cause bacteremia in patients who have had long hospital stays or frequent antibiotic use in the past (see antibiotic misuse).

=== Gram negative bacteremia ===
Gram negative bacterial species are responsible for approximately 24% of all cases of healthcare-associated bacteremia and 45% of all cases of community-acquired bacteremia. In general, gram negative bacteria enter the bloodstream from infections in the respiratory tract, genitourinary tract, gastrointestinal tract, or hepatobiliary system. Gram-negative bacteremia occurs more frequently in elderly populations (65 years or older) and is associated with higher morbidity and mortality in this population.E.coli is the most common cause of community-acquired bacteremia accounting for approximately 75% of cases. E.coli bacteremia is usually the result of a urinary tract infection. Other organisms that can cause community-acquired bacteremia include Pseudomonas aeruginosa, Klebsiella pneumoniae, and Proteus mirabilis. Salmonella infection, despite mainly only resulting in gastroenteritis in the developed world, is a common cause of bacteremia in Africa. It principally affects children who lack antibodies to Salmonella and HIV+ patients of all ages.

Among healthcare-associated cases of bacteremia, gram negative organisms are an important cause of bacteremia in the ICU. Catheters in the veins, arteries, or urinary tract can all create a way for gram negative bacteria to enter the bloodstream. Surgical procedures of the genitourinary tract, intestinal tract, or hepatobiliary tract can also lead to gram negative bacteremia. Pseudomonas and Enterobacter species are the most important causes of gram negative bacteremia in the ICU.

=== Bacteremia risk factors ===
There are several risk factors that increase the likelihood of developing bacteremia from any type of bacteria. These include:

- HIV infection
- Diabetes Mellitus
- Chronic hemodialysis
- Solid organ transplant
- Stem cell transplant
- Treatment with glucocorticoids
- Liver failure
- Asplenia

== Mechanism ==
Bacteremia can travel through the blood stream to distant sites in the body and cause infection (hematogenous spread). Hematogenous spread of bacteria is part of the pathophysiology of certain infections of the heart (endocarditis), structures around the brain (meningitis), and tuberculosis of the spine (Pott's disease). Hematogenous spread of bacteria is responsible for many bone infections (osteomyelitis).

Prosthetic cardiac implants (for example artificial heart valves) are especially vulnerable to infection from bacteremia. Prior to widespread use of vaccines, occult bacteremia was an important consideration in febrile children that appeared otherwise well.

== Diagnosis ==
Bacteremia is most commonly diagnosed by blood culture, in which a sample of blood drawn from the vein by needle puncture is allowed to incubate with a medium that promotes bacterial growth. If bacteria are present in the bloodstream at the time the sample is obtained, the bacteria will multiply and can thereby be detected. Recent technical procedures enable the isolation of bacteria from whole blood within an hour without the need for blood culture, although these methods have been verified only for bacteria-spiked blood of healthy donors and not yet for septic patient samples.

In parallel, molecular-based methods, including PCR panels applied directly to whole blood, have emerged as culture-independent approaches that can identify pathogens within hours rather than days. These rapid molecular assays offer shorter turnaround times than conventional blood culture, though their specificity and sensitivity relative to blood culture varies by platform.

Any bacteria that incidentally find their way to the culture medium will also multiply. For example, if the skin is not adequately cleaned before needle puncture, contamination of the blood sample with normal bacteria that live on the surface of the skin can occur. For this reason, blood cultures must be drawn with great attention to sterile process. The presence of certain bacteria in the blood culture, such as Staphylococcus aureus, Streptococcus pneumoniae, and Escherichia coli almost never represent a contamination of the sample. On the other hand, contamination may be more highly suspected if organisms like Staphylococcus epidermidis or Cutibacterium acnes grow in the blood culture.

Two blood cultures drawn from separate sites of the body are often sufficient to diagnose bacteremia. Two out of two cultures growing the same type of bacteria usually represents a real bacteremia, particularly if the organism that grows is not a common contaminant. One out of two positive cultures will usually prompt a repeat set of blood cultures to be drawn to confirm whether a contaminant or a real bacteremia is present. The patient's skin is typically cleaned with an alcohol-based product prior to drawing blood to prevent contamination. Blood cultures may be repeated at intervals to determine if persistent—rather than transient—bacteremia is present.

Prior to drawing blood cultures, a thorough patient history should be taken with particular regard to presence of both fevers and chills, other focal signs of infection such as in the skin or soft tissue, a state of immunosuppression, or any recent invasive procedures.

Ultrasound of the heart is recommended in all those with bacteremia due to Staphylococcus aureus to rule out infectious endocarditis.

Blood culture is the reference standard for diagnosing bloodstream infections globally, but its implementation in low- and middle-income countries (LMICs) faces substantial barriers. These include financial constraints, lack of laboratory infrastructure, unreliable electricity supply, inadequate cold chains for culture media and shortages of trained personnel. In many LMICs, diagnostic microbiology services for bloodstream infections are limited or entirely absent. For example, some countries lack any facility capable of performing pathogen identification and antimicrobial susceptibility testing, even at the highest level of the health system. As a result, clinicians often rely on empirical antibiotic therapy without microbiological confirmation, which has implications for patient outcomes and antimicrobial resistance surveillance.

=== Definition ===
Bacteremia is the presence of bacteria in the bloodstream that are alive and capable of reproducing. It is a type of bloodstream infection. Bacteremia is defined as either a primary or secondary process. In primary bacteremia, bacteria have been directly introduced into the bloodstream. Injection drug use may lead to primary bacteremia. In the hospital setting, use of blood vessel catheters contaminated with bacteria may also lead to primary bacteremia. Secondary bacteremia occurs when bacteria have entered the body at another site, such as the cuts in the skin, or the mucous membranes of the lungs (respiratory tract), mouth or intestines (gastrointestinal tract), bladder (urinary tract), or genitals. Bacteria that have infected the body at these sites may then spread into the lymphatic system and gain access to the bloodstream, where further spread can occur.

Bacteremia may also be defined by the timing of bacteria presence in the bloodstream: transient, intermittent, or persistent. In transient bacteremia, bacteria are present in the bloodstream for minutes to a few hours before being cleared from the body, and the result is typically harmless in healthy people. This can occur after manipulation of parts of the body normally colonized by bacteria, such as the mucosal surfaces of the mouth during tooth brushing, flossing, or dental procedures, or instrumentation of the bladder or colon. Intermittent bacteremia is characterized by periodic seeding of the same bacteria into the bloodstream by an existing infection elsewhere in the body, such as an abscess, pneumonia, or bone infection, followed by clearing of that bacteria from the bloodstream. This cycle will often repeat until the existing infection is successfully treated. Persistent bacteremia is characterized by the continuous presence of bacteria in the bloodstream. It is usually the result of an infected heart valve, a central line-associated bloodstream infection (CLABSI), an infected blood clot (suppurative thrombophlebitis), or an infected blood vessel graft. Persistent bacteremia can also occur as part of the infection process of typhoid fever, brucellosis, and bacterial meningitis. Left untreated, conditions causing persistent bacteremia can be potentially fatal.

Bacteremia is clinically distinct from sepsis, which is a condition where the blood stream infection is associated with an inflammatory response from the body, often causing abnormalities in body temperature, heart rate, breathing rate, blood pressure, and white blood cell count.

== Treatment ==
The presence of bacteria in the blood almost always requires treatment with antibiotics. This is because there are high mortality rates from progression to sepsis if antibiotics are delayed. This is especially the case if the sepsis gets worse, and even more if it becomes severe sepsis (where organ damage begins), septic shock (the organ damage continues, which lowers the blood pressure to the point where special drugs are needed to help keep it high enough), or multiple organ dysfunction syndrome (where organ damage can quickly become fatal, even with supportive devices).

The treatment of bacteremia should begin with empiric antibiotic coverage. Any patient presenting with signs or symptoms of bacteremia or a positive blood culture should be started on intravenous antibiotics. The choice of antibiotic is determined by the most likely source of infection and by the characteristic organisms that typically cause that infection. Other important considerations include the patient's history of antibiotic use, the severity of the presenting symptoms, and any allergies to antibiotics. Empiric antibiotics should be narrowed, preferably to a single antibiotic, once the blood culture returns with a particular bacteria that has been isolated.

=== Gram positive bacteremia ===
The Infectious Disease Society of America (IDSA) recommends treating uncomplicated methicillin resistant staph aureus (MRSA) bacteremia with a 14-day course of intravenous vancomycin. Uncomplicated bacteremia is defined as having positive blood cultures for MRSA, but having no evidence of endocarditis, no implanted prostheses, negative blood cultures after 2–4 days of treatment, and signs of clinical improvement after 72 hrs.

The antibiotic treatment of choice for streptococcal and enteroccal infections differs by species. However, it is important to look at the antibiotic resistance pattern for each species from the blood culture to better treat infections caused by resistant organisms.

=== Gram negative bacteremia ===
The treatment of gram negative bacteremia is also highly dependent on the causative organism. Empiric antibiotic therapy should be guided by the most likely source of infection and the patient's past exposure to healthcare facilities. In particular, a recent history of exposure to a healthcare setting may necessitate the need for antibiotics with pseudomonas aeruginosa coverage or broader coverage for resistant organisms. Extended generation cephalosporins such as ceftriaxone or beta lactam/beta lactamase inhibitor antibiotics such as piperacillin-tazobactam are frequently used for the treatment of gram negative bacteremia.

=== Catheter-associated infections ===
For healthcare-associated bacteremia due to intravenous catheters, the IDSA has published guidelines for catheter removal. Short term catheters (in place <14 days) should be removed if bacteremia is caused by any gram negative bacteria, staph aureus, enterococci or mycobacteria. Long term catheters (>14 days) should be removed if the patient is developing signs or symptoms of sepsis or endocarditis, or if blood cultures remain positive for more than 72 hours.

== See also ==
- Antibiotic prophylaxis
- Dental antibiotic prophylaxis
- Fungemia
- Viremia
