= Erosio interdigitalis blastomycetica =

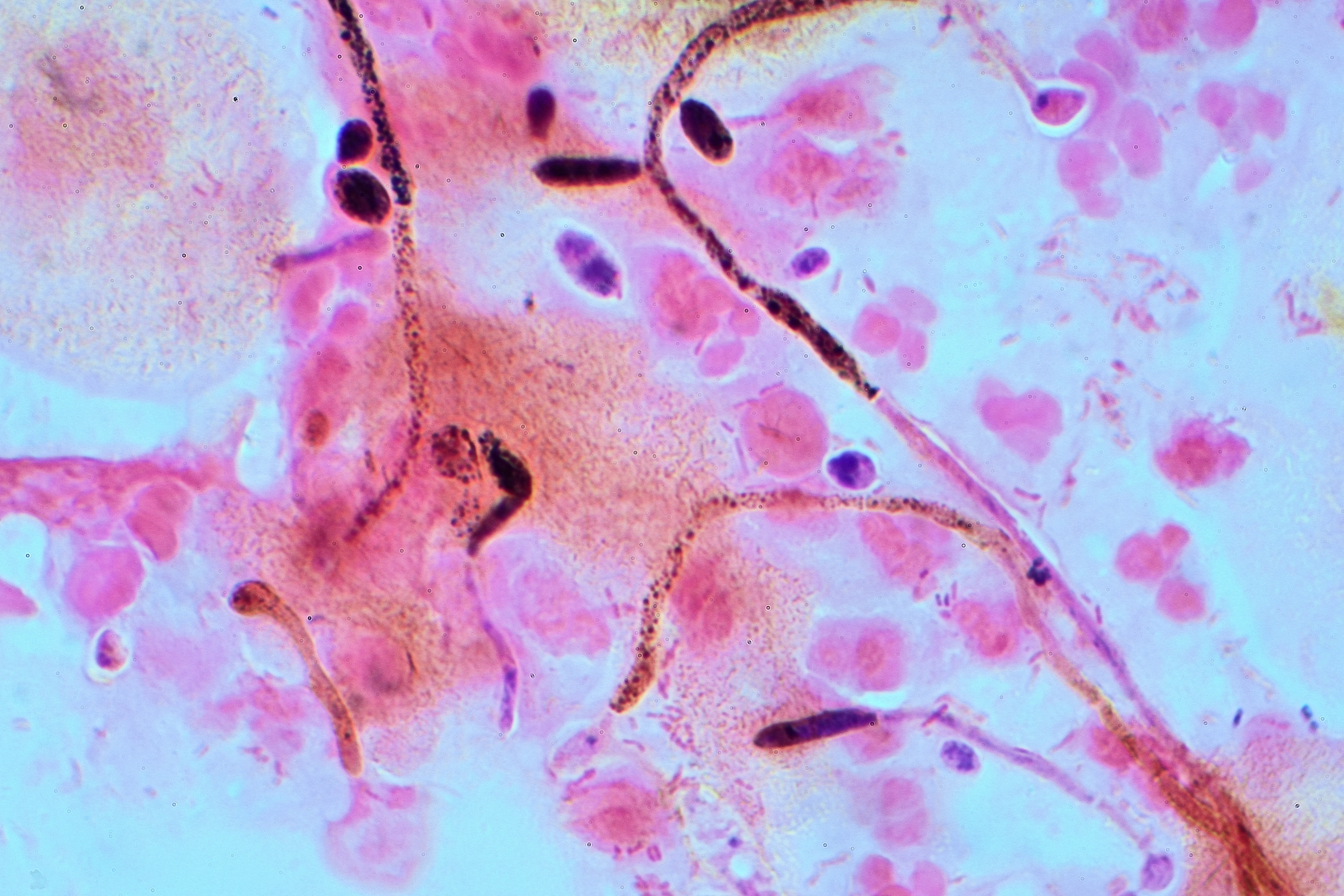
- Specialty: Dermatology

Erosio interdigitalis blastomycetica (EIB) is a skin condition caused by a Candida albicans infection, characterised by an oval-shaped area of macerated white skin on the web between and extending on to the sides of the fingers.

== Signs and symptoms ==
It is common among bartenders and homemakers. EIB can be found on both the hands and feet. It is most common between the middle and ring finger and sometimes found between toes.

== Cause ==
It is believed that EIB is caused by working with water often. It is not known exactly how long the infection will last since it varies often between people who have gotten infected. The most common symptoms are pruritus and discomfort while on rare occasions some do experience pain.

== Treatment ==
Keep the site dry using soft cotton. Avoid immersion in liquids or other trigger factors. Topical econazole is useful.

== History ==
EIB was first discovered by two scientists,"Henry Gougerot" and "Goncea" in 1915. It was later named by another scientist "Johannes Fabry" in 1917.

== See also ==
- Candidiasis
- Skin lesion
