= Micafungin =

Chemical compound

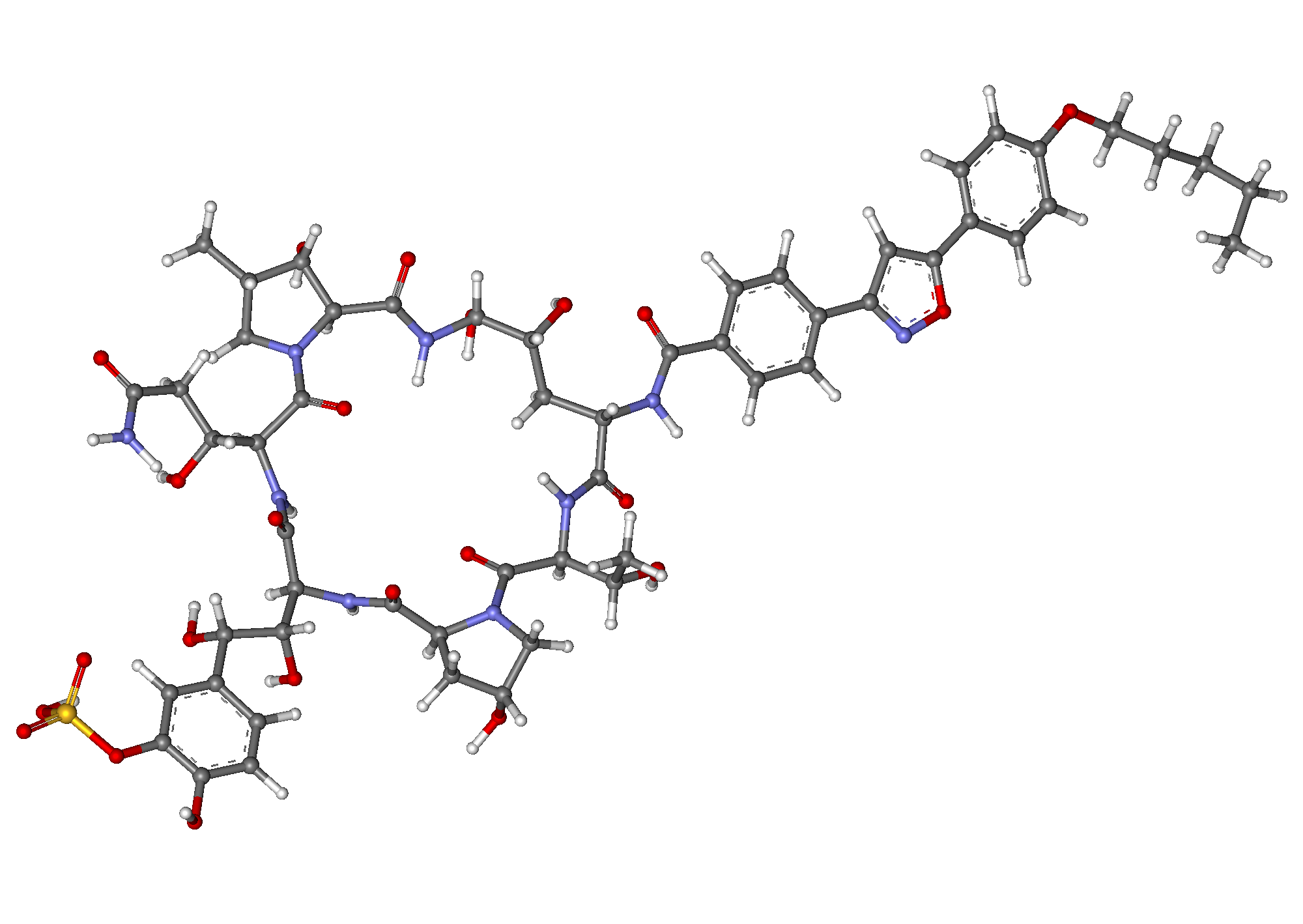

Clinical data
- Trade names: Mycamine
- AHFS/Drugs.com: Monograph
- License data: US DailyMed: Micafungin
- Routes of administration: Intravenous
- ATC code: J02AX05 (WHO)

Legal status
- Legal status: US: ℞-only; In general: ℞ (Prescription only)

Pharmacokinetic data
- Protein binding: 99.8%
- Metabolism: Via catechol-O-methyltransferase pathway
- Elimination half-life: 11–17 hours
- Excretion: 40% feces, <15% urine

Identifiers
- IUPAC name: {5-[(1S,2S)-2-[(3S,6S,9S,11R,15S,18S,20R,21R,24S,25S,26S)-3-[(1R)-2-carbamoyl-1-hydroxyethyl]-11,20,21,25-tetrahydroxy-15-[(1R)-1-hydroxyethyl]-26-methyl-2,5,8,14,17,23-hexaoxo-18-[(4-{5-[4-(pentyloxy)phenyl]-1,2-oxazol-3-yl}benzene)amido]-1,4,7,13,16,22-hexaazatricyclo[22.3.0.0^{9,13}]heptacosan-6-yl]-1,2-dihydroxyethyl]-2-hydroxyphenyl}oxidanesulfonic acid
- CAS Number: 235114-32-6
- PubChem CID: 477468
- DrugBank: DB01141
- ChemSpider: 21106351
- UNII: R10H71BSWG
- KEGG: D02465
- ChEMBL: ChEMBL1201351
- CompTox Dashboard (EPA): DTXSID90873341

Chemical and physical data
- Formula: C_{56}H_{71}N_{9}O_{23}S
- Molar mass: 1270.28 g·mol^{−1}
- 3D model (JSmol): Interactive image
- SMILES: CCCCCOc1ccc(-c2cc(-c3ccc(C(=O)N[C@H]4C[C@@H](O)[C@@H](O)N=C(O)[C@@H]5[C@@H](O)[C@@H](C)CN5C(=O)[C@H]([C@H](O)CC(=N)O)N=C(O)[C@H]([C@H](O)[C@@H](O)c5ccc(O)c(OS(=O)(=O)O)c5)N=C(O)[C@@H]5C[C@@H](O)CN5C(=O)[C@H]([C@H](C)O)N=C4O)cc3)no2)cc1
- InChI: InChI=1S/C56H71N9O23S/c1-4-5-6-17-86-32-14-11-28(12-15-32)39-21-33(63-87-39)27-7-9-29(10-8-27)49(75)58-34-20-38(70)52(78)62-54(80)45-46(72)25(2)23-65(45)56(82)43(37(69)22-41(57)71)60-53(79)44(48(74)47(73)30-13-16-36(68)40(18-30)88-89(83,84)85)61-51(77)35-19-31(67)24-64(35)55(81)42(26(3)66)59-50(34)76/h7-16,18,21,25-26,31,34-35,37-38,42-48,52,66-70,72-74,78H,4-6,17,19-20,22-24H2,1-3H3,(H2,57,71)(H,58,75)(H,59,76)(H,60,79)(H,61,77)(H,62,80)(H,83,84,85)/t25-,26-,31+,34-,35-,37+,38+,42-,43-,44-,45-,46-,47-,48-,52+/m0/s1; Key:PIEUQSKUWLMALL-NFGJWQNFSA-N

Micafungin, sold under the brand name Mycamine, is an echinocandin antifungal medication used to treat and prevent invasive fungal infections including candidemia, abscesses, and esophageal candidiasis. It inhibits the production of beta-1,3-glucan, an essential component of fungal cell walls that is not found in mammals.

Administered intravenously, Micafungin received final approval from the U.S. Food and Drug Administration (FDA) in March 2005, and gained approval in the European Union in April 2008. It is on the World Health Organization's List of Essential Medicines.

In August 2023, Mycamine was acquired from Astellas Pharma by Sandoz.

== Indications ==
Micafungin is indicated for the treatment of candidemia, acute disseminated candidiasis, Candida peritonitis, abscesses and esophageal candidiasis.

Micafungin works by way of concentration-dependent inhibition of 1,3-beta-D-glucan synthase resulting in reduced formation of 1,3-beta-D-glucan, which is an essential polysaccharide comprising one-third of the majority of Candida spp. cell walls. This decreased glucan production leads to osmotic instability and thus cellular lysis.

== Dosage ==
The metabolism of micafungin occurs hepatically via acryp sulfatase followed by secondary metabolism by a transferase. Precautions should be taken with regards to dosing, as micafungin weakly inhibits CYP3A4.

== Dosage forms ==
Micafungin is a natural antifungal product derived from other fungi as a defense mechanism for competition of nutrients, etc. To be specific, micafungin is derived from FR901379, and is produced by Coleophoma empetri.
