= Candidiasis =

Fungal infection due to any type of Candida

- Other names: Candidosis, moniliasis, oidiomycosis
- Oral candidiasis (thrush)
- Specialty: Infectious disease
- Symptoms: White patches or vaginal discharge, itching
- Causes: Candida (a type of yeast)
- Risk factors: Immunosuppression (HIV/AIDS), diabetes, corticosteroids, antibiotic therapy
- Medication: Clotrimazole, nystatin, fluconazole
- Frequency: 6% of babies (mouth) 75% of women at some time (vaginal)

Candidiasis is a fungal infection due to any species of yeasts in the genus Candida or those that were formerly classified in genus Candida but are now classified in the genus Candidozyma. When it affects the mouth (oral candidiasis) it is commonly known as thrush. Signs and symptoms include white patches on the tongue or other areas of the mouth and throat. Other symptoms may include soreness and problems swallowing. When it affects the vagina, it may be referred to as a yeast infection or thrush. Signs and symptoms include genital itching, burning, and sometimes a white "cottage cheese-like" discharge from the vagina. Yeast infections of the penis are less common and typically present with an itchy rash. Very rarely, yeast infections may become invasive, spreading to other parts of the body. This may result in fevers, among other symptoms. Finally, candidiasis of the esophagus is an important risk factor for contracting esophageal cancer in individuals with achalasia.

More than 20 types of Candida may cause infection with Candida albicans being the most common. Infections of the mouth are most common among children less than one month old, the elderly, and those with weak immune systems. Conditions that result in a weak immune system include HIV/AIDS, the medications used after organ transplantation, diabetes, and the use of corticosteroids. Other risk factors include during breastfeeding, following antibiotic therapy, and the wearing of dentures. Vaginal infections occur more commonly during pregnancy, in those with weak immune systems, and following antibiotic therapy. Individuals at risk for invasive candidiasis include low birth weight babies, people recovering from surgery, people admitted to intensive care units, and those with an otherwise compromised immune system.

Efforts to prevent infections of the mouth include the use of chlorhexidine mouthwash in those with poor immune function and washing out the mouth following the use of inhaled steroids. Little evidence supports probiotics for either prevention or treatment, even among those with frequent vaginal infections. For infections of the mouth, treatment with topical clotrimazole or nystatin is usually effective. Oral or intravenous fluconazole, itraconazole, or amphotericin B may be used if these do not work. A number of topical antifungal medications may be used for vaginal infections, including clotrimazole. In those with widespread disease, an echinocandin such as caspofungin or micafungin is used. A number of weeks of intravenous amphotericin B may be used as an alternative. In certain groups at very high risk, antifungal medications may be used preventively, and concomitantly with medications known to precipitate infections.

Infections of the mouth occur in about 6% of babies less than a month old. About 20% of those receiving chemotherapy for cancer and 20% of those with AIDS also develop the disease. About three-quarters of women have at least one yeast infection at some time during their lives. Widespread disease is rare except in those who have risk factors.

== Signs and symptoms ==
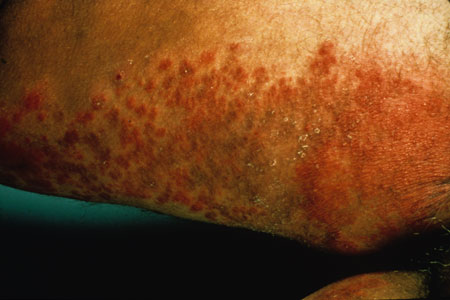
Skin candidiasis

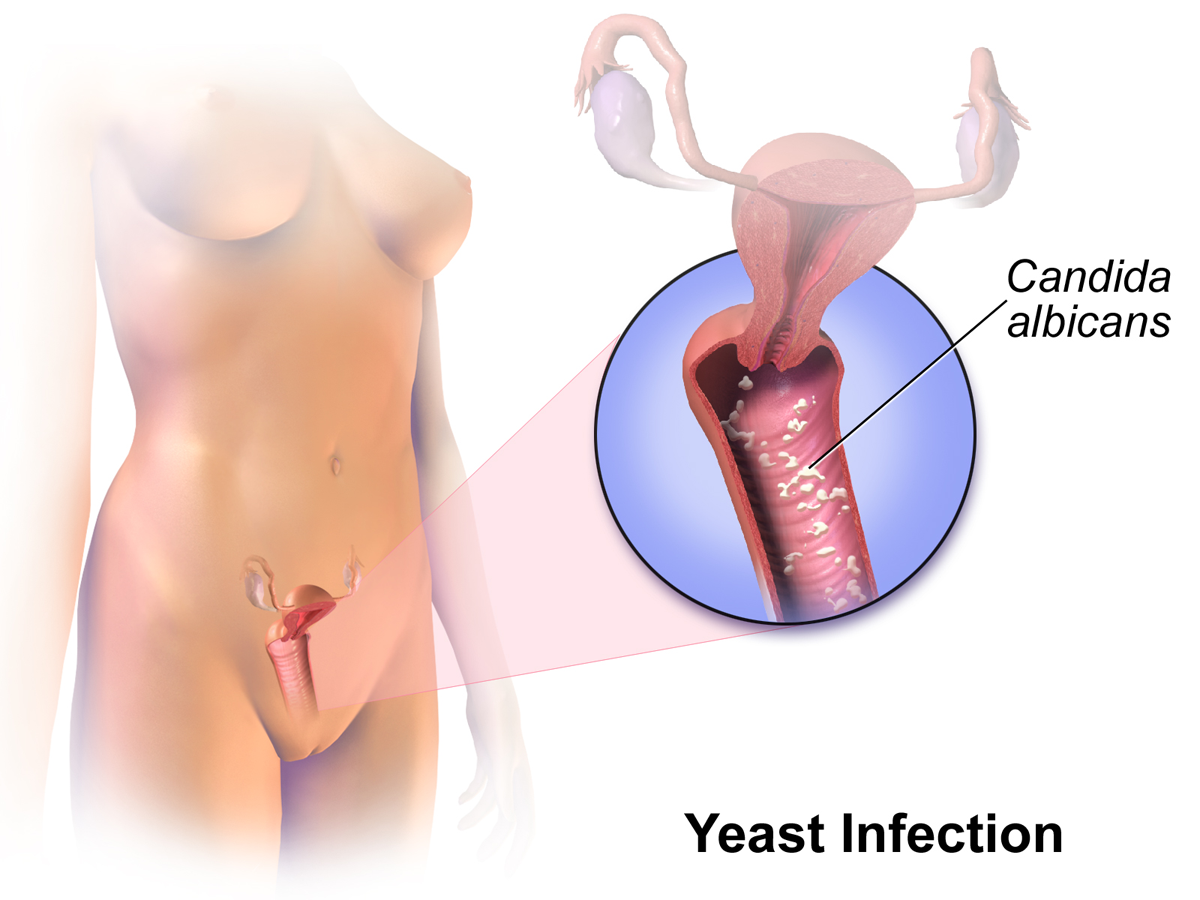
Vaginal yeast infection

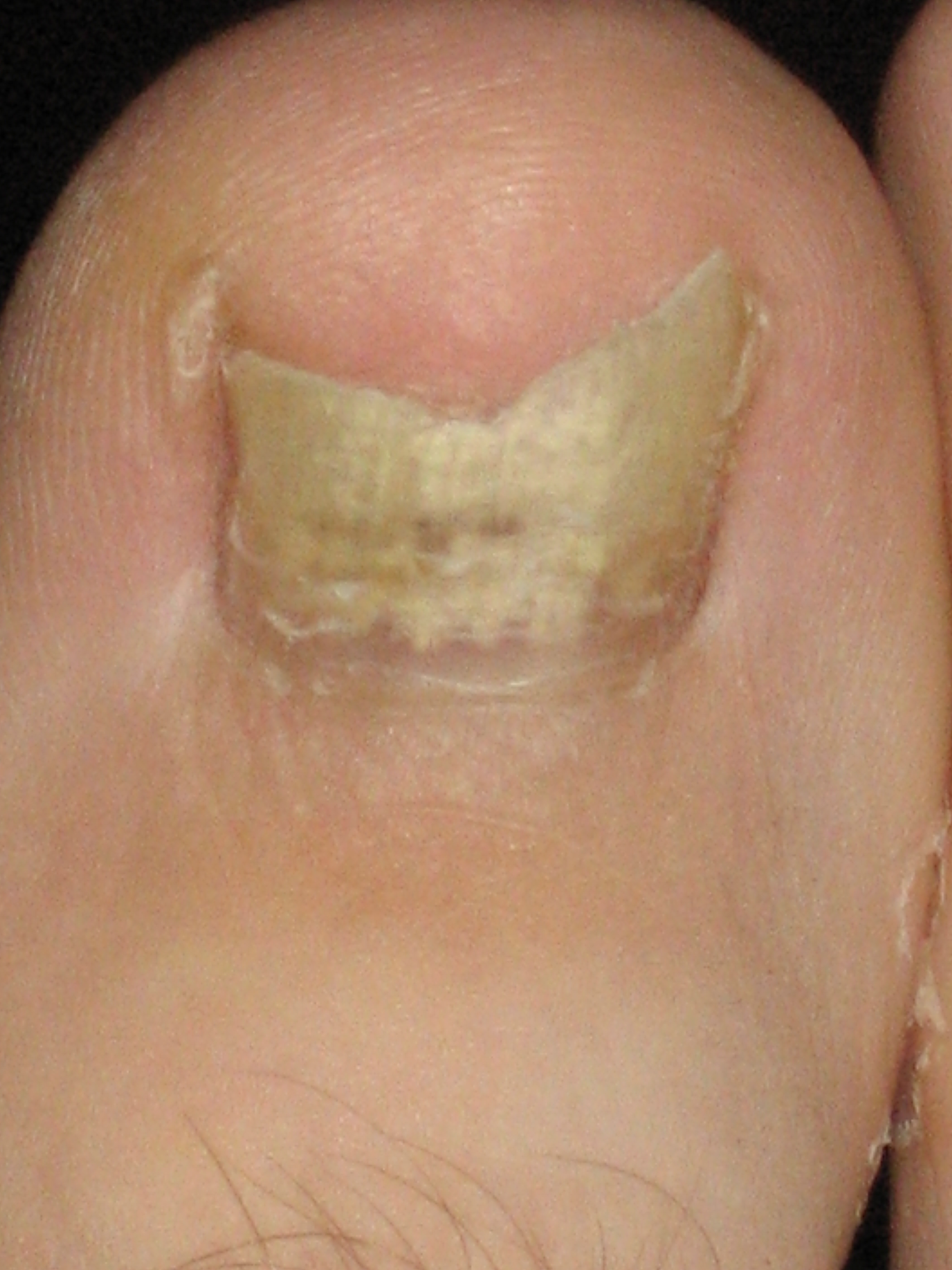
Nail candidiasis (onychomycosis)

Signs and symptoms of candidiasis vary depending on the area affected. Most candidal infections result in minimal complications such as redness, itching, and discomfort, though complications may be severe or even fatal if left untreated in certain populations. In healthy (immunocompetent) persons, candidiasis is usually a localized infection of the skin, fingernails or toenails (onychomycosis), or mucosal membranes, including the oral cavity and pharynx (thrush), esophagus, and the sex organs (vagina, penis, etc.); less commonly in healthy individuals, the gastrointestinal tract, urinary tract, and respiratory tract are sites of candida infection.

In immunocompromised individuals, Candida infections in the esophagus occur more frequently than in healthy individuals and have a higher potential of becoming systemic, causing a much more serious condition, a fungemia called candidemia. Symptoms of esophageal candidiasis include difficulty swallowing, painful swallowing, abdominal pain, nausea, and vomiting.

=== Mouth ===
Infection in the mouth is characterized by white discolorations in the tongue, around the mouth, and in the throat. Irritation may also occur, causing discomfort when swallowing.

Thrush is commonly seen in infants. It is not considered abnormal in infants unless it lasts longer than a few weeks.

=== Genitals ===
Infection of the vagina or vulva may cause severe itching, burning, soreness, irritation, and a whitish or whitish-gray cottage cheese-like discharge. Symptoms of infection of the male genitalia (balanitis thrush) include red skin around the head of the penis, swelling, irritation, itchiness and soreness of the head of the penis, thick, lumpy discharge under the foreskin, unpleasant odour, difficulty retracting the foreskin (phimosis), and pain when passing urine or during sex.

=== Skin ===
Signs and symptoms of candidiasis in the skin include itching, irritation, and chafing or broken skin.

=== Invasive infection ===
Common symptoms of gastrointestinal candidiasis in healthy individuals are anal itching, belching, bloating, indigestion, nausea, diarrhea, gas, intestinal cramps, vomiting, and gastric ulcers. Perianal candidiasis can cause anal itching; the lesion can be red, papular, or ulcerative in appearance, and it is not considered to be a sexually transmitted infection. Abnormal proliferation of the candida in the gut may lead to dysbiosis. While it is not yet clear, this alteration may be the source of symptoms generally described as irritable bowel syndrome, and other gastrointestinal diseases.

=== Neurological symptoms ===
Systemic candidiasis can affect the central nervous system, causing a variety of neurological symptoms, with a presentation similar to meningitis.

== Causes ==
Candida yeasts are generally present in healthy humans, frequently part of the human body's normal oral and intestinal flora, and particularly on the skin; however, their growth is normally limited by the human immune system and by competition of other microorganisms, such as bacteria occupying the same locations in the human body. Candida requires moisture for growth, notably on the skin. For example, wearing wet swimwear for long periods of time is believed to be a risk factor. Candida can also cause diaper rashes in babies. In extreme cases, superficial infections of the skin or mucous membranes may enter the bloodstream and cause systemic Candida infections.

Factors that increase the risk of candidiasis include HIV/AIDS, mononucleosis, cancer treatments, steroids, stress, antibiotic therapy, diabetes, and nutrient deficiency. Hormone replacement therapy and infertility treatments may also be predisposing factors. Use of inhaled corticosteroids increases risk of candidiasis of the mouth. Inhaled corticosteroids with other risk factors such as antibiotics, oral glucocorticoids, not rinsing mouth after use of inhaled corticosteroids or high dose of inhaled corticosteroids put people at even higher risk. Treatment with antibiotics can lead to eliminating the yeast's natural competitors for resources in the oral and intestinal flora, thereby increasing the severity of the condition. A weakened or undeveloped immune system or metabolic illnesses are significant predisposing factors of candidiasis. Almost 15% of people with weakened immune systems develop a systemic illness caused by Candida species. Diets high in simple carbohydrates have been found to affect rates of oral candidiases.

C. albicans was isolated from the vaginas of approximately 10%-15% of apparently healthy women, i.e., those who experienced few or no symptoms of infection. External use of detergents or douches or internal disturbances (hormonal or physiological) can perturb the normal vaginal flora, consisting of lactic acid bacteria, such as lactobacilli, and result in an overgrowth of Candida cells, causing symptoms of infection, such as local inflammation. Pregnancy and the use of oral contraceptives have been reported as risk factors. Diabetes mellitus and the use of antibiotics are also linked to increased rates of yeast infections.

In penile candidiasis, the causes include sexual intercourse with an infected individual, low immunity, antibiotics, and diabetes. Male genital yeast infections are less common, but a yeast infection on the penis caused by direct contact via sexual intercourse with an infected partner is not uncommon.

Breastfeeding mothers may develop candidiasis on and around the nipple due to the moisture created by excessive milk production.

Vaginal candidiasis can cause congenital candidiasis in newborns.

== Diagnosis ==
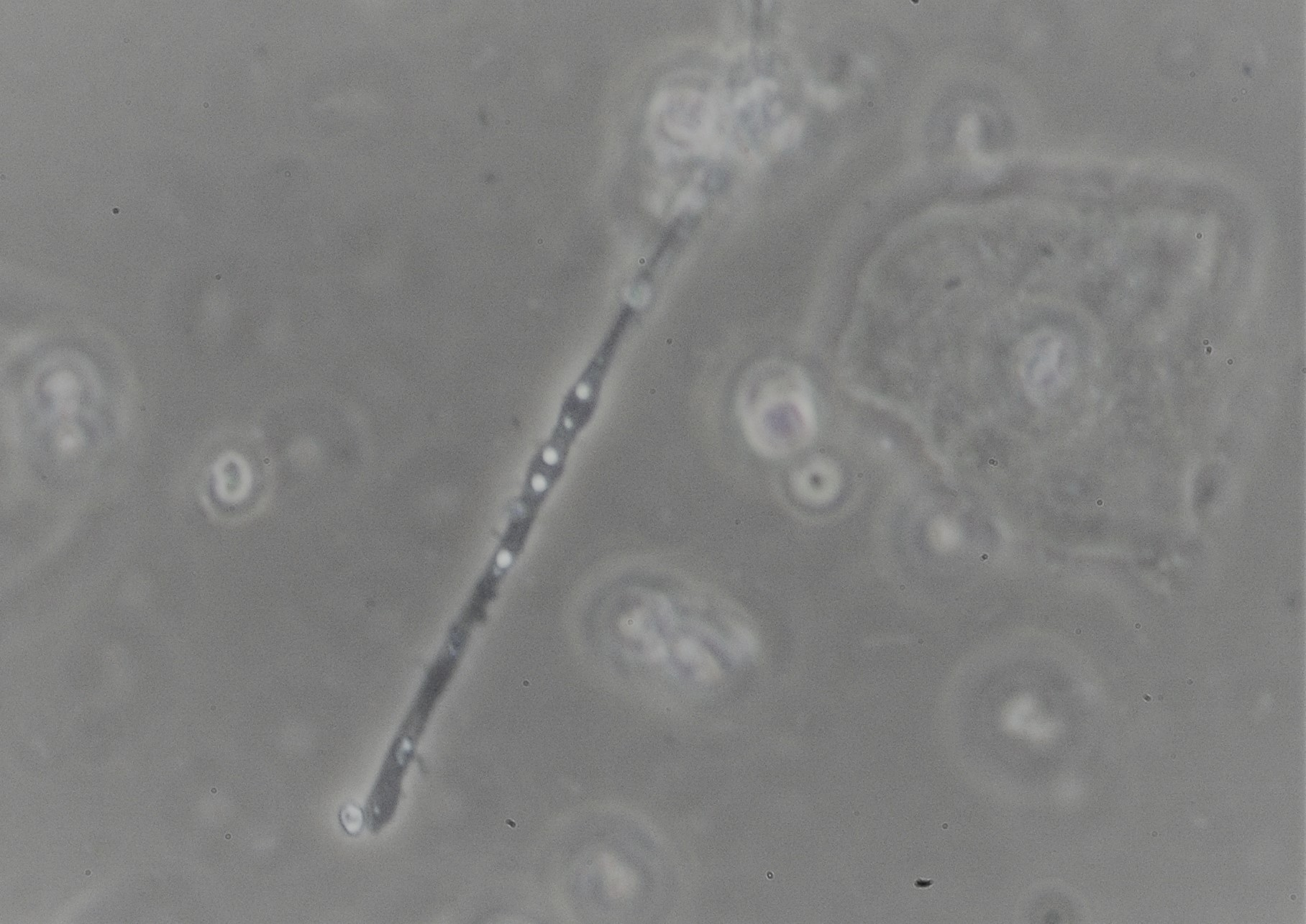
Vaginal swab wet mount of candida (phase contrast) showing the pseudohyphae

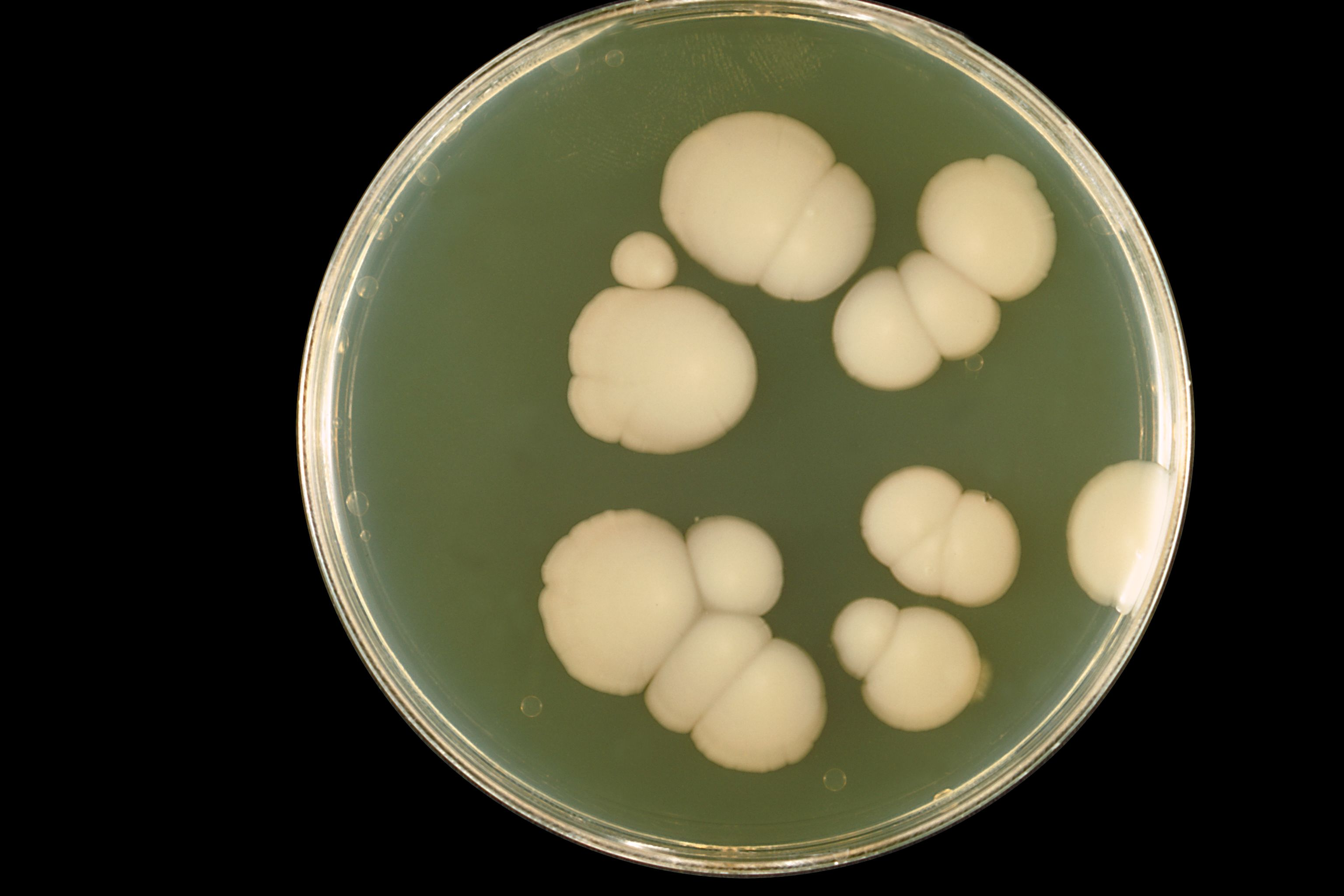
Agar plate culture of C. albicans

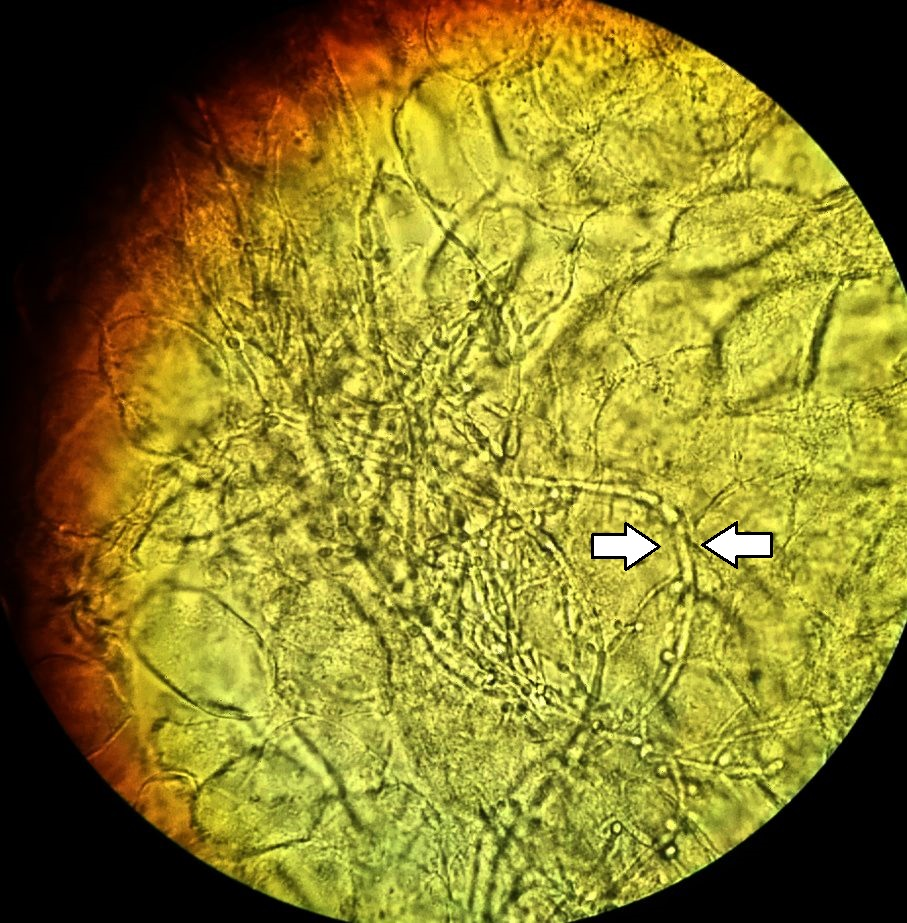
KOH test on a vaginal wet mount, showing slings of pseudohyphae of Candida albicans surrounded by round vaginal epithelial cells, conferring a diagnosis of candidal vulvovaginitis

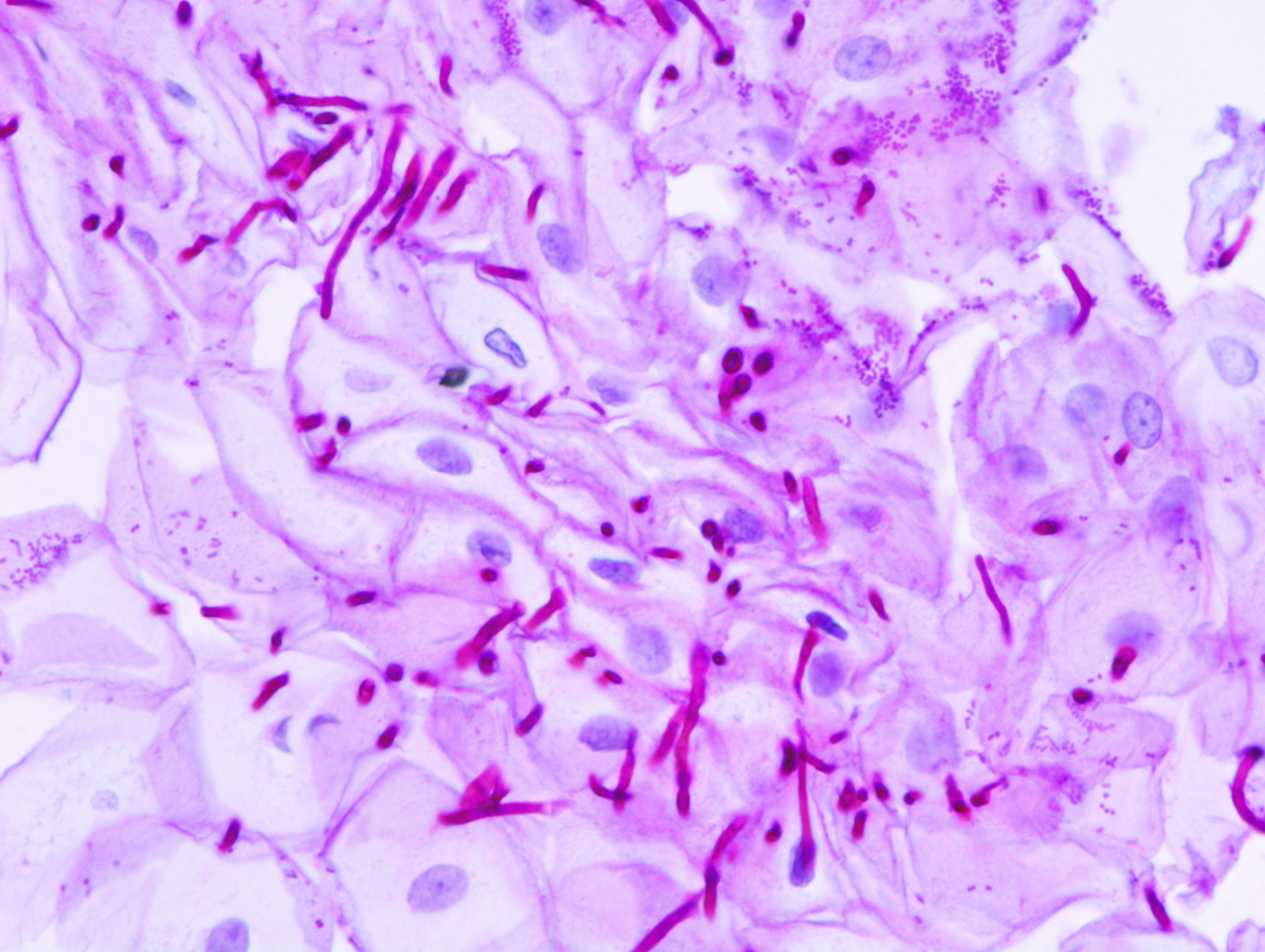
Micrograph of esophageal candidiasis showing hyphae, biopsy specimen, PAS stain

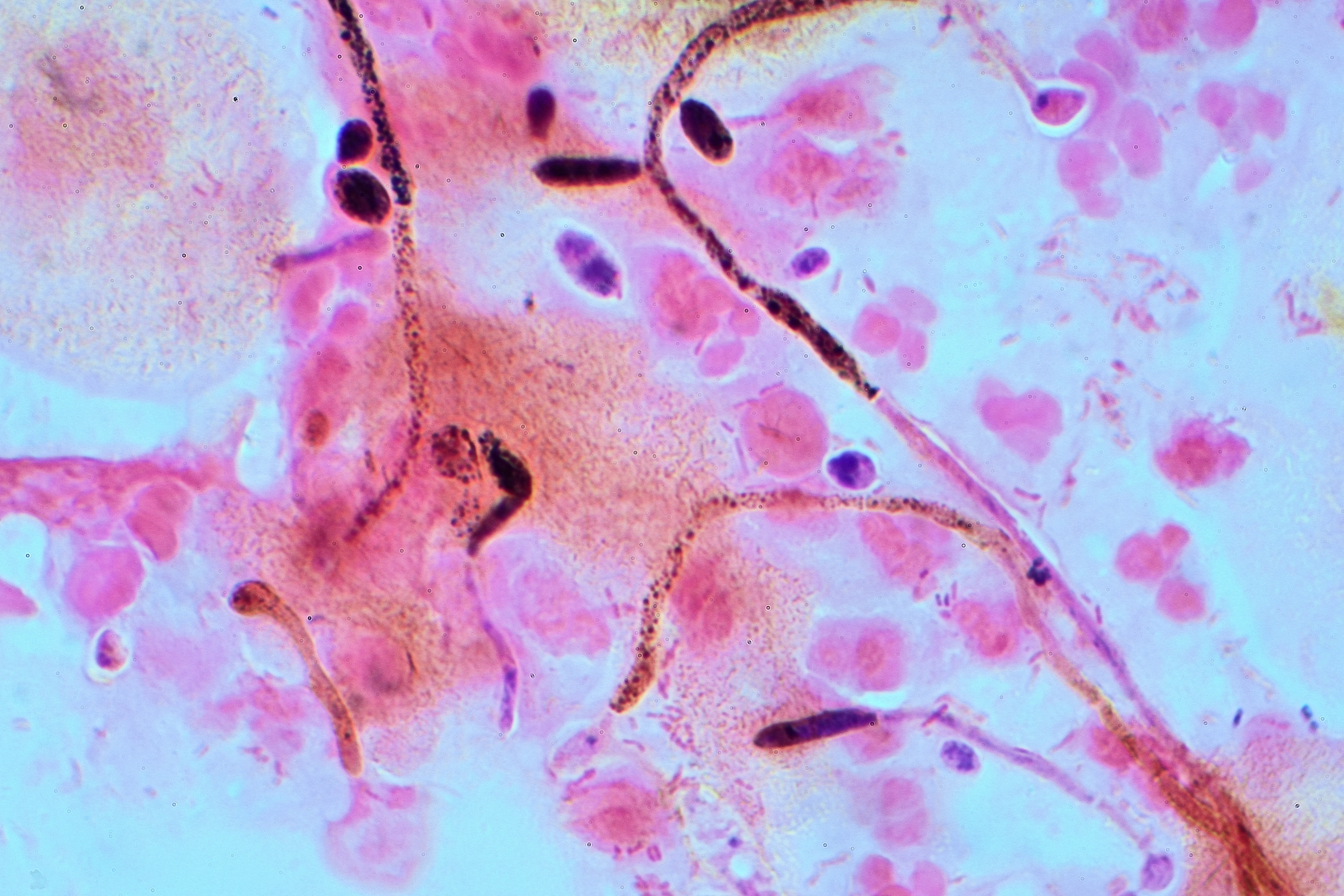
Gram stain of Candida albicans from a vaginal swab; the small oval chlamydospores are 2–4 μm in diameter

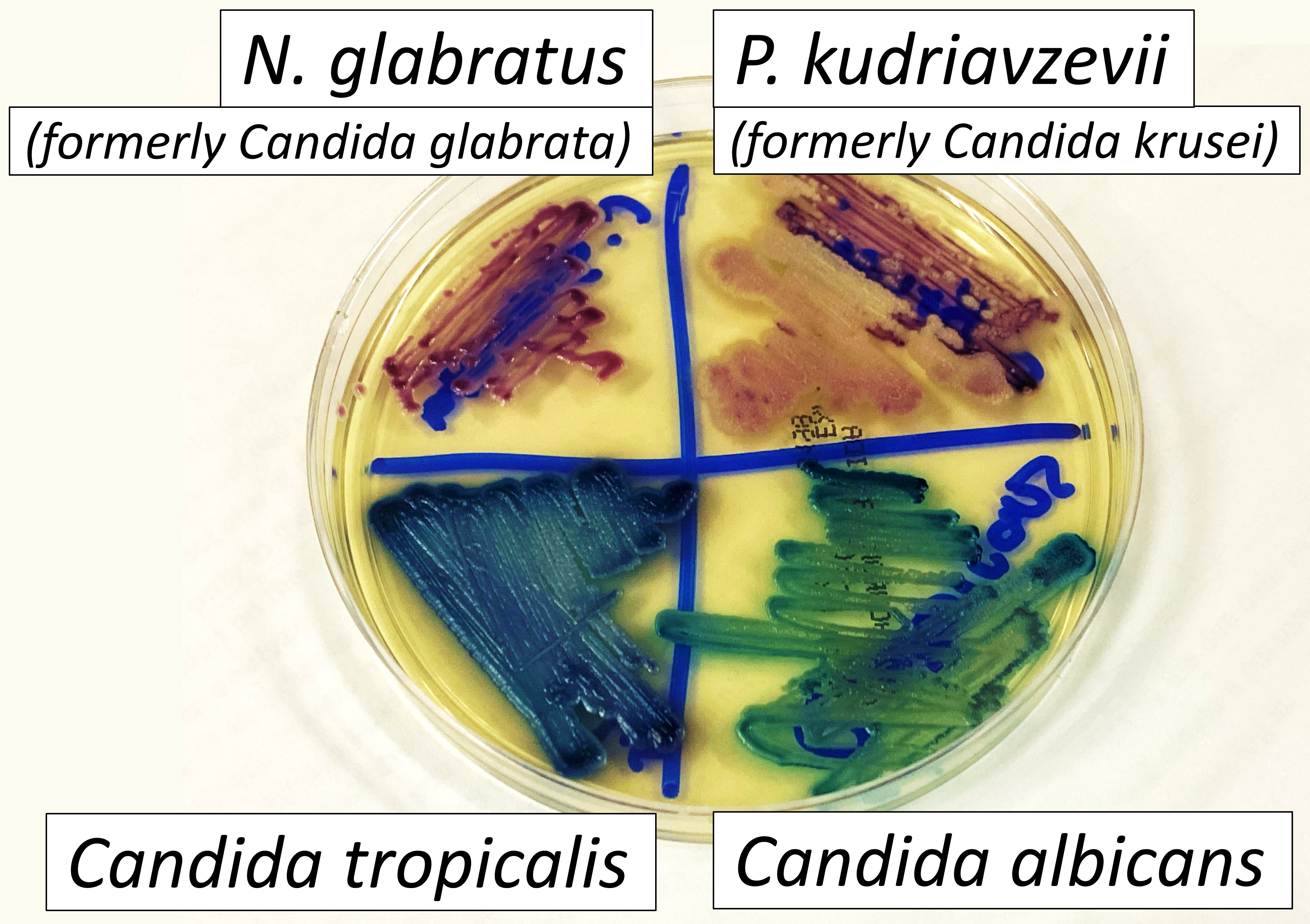
Chromogenic agar can help in indicating the involved species of Candida versus similar fungi. (CHROMAgar shown)

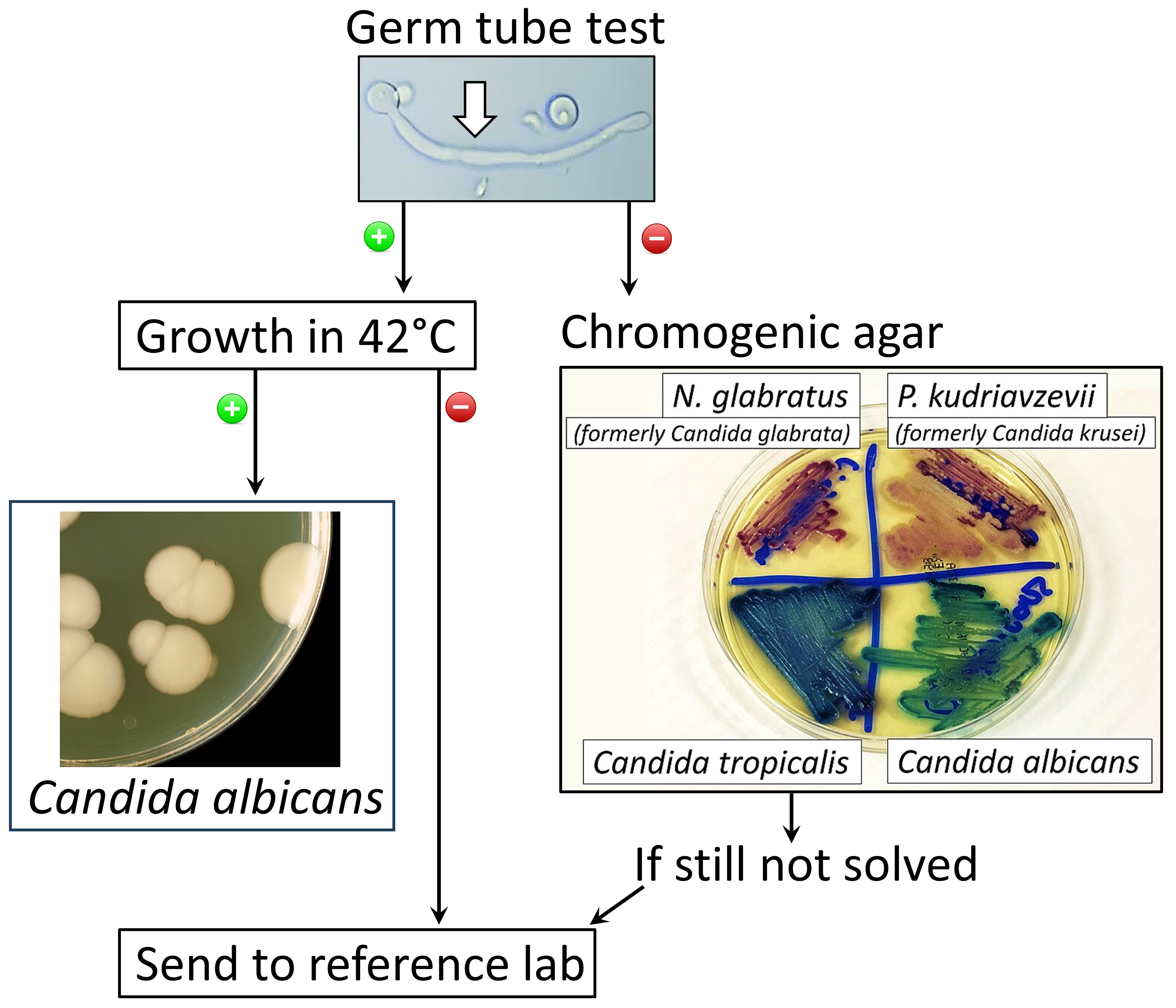
Algorithm for the diagnosis of Candida versus differential diagnoses

In oral candidiasis, simply inspecting the person's mouth for white patches and irritation may make the diagnosis. A sample of the infected area may also be taken to determine what organism is causing the infection.

Symptoms of vaginal candidiasis are also present in the more common bacterial vaginosis; aerobic vaginitis is distinct and should be excluded in the differential diagnosis. In a 2002 study, only 33% of women who were self-treating for a yeast infection were found to have such an infection, while most had either bacterial vaginosis or a mixed-type infection.

Diagnosis of a yeast infection is confirmed either via microscopic examination or culturing. For identification by light microscopy, a scraping or swab of the affected area is placed on a microscope slide. A single drop of 10% potassium hydroxide (KOH) solution is then added to the specimen. The KOH dissolves the skin cells, but leaves the Candida cells intact, permitting visualization of pseudohyphae and budding yeast cells typical of many Candida species.

For the culturing method, a sterile swab is rubbed on the infected skin surface. The swab is then streaked on a culture medium. The culture is incubated at 37 °C (98.6 °F) for several days, allowing development of yeast or bacterial colonies. The characteristics (such as morphology and color) of the colonies may allow initial diagnosis of the organism causing disease symptoms. Respiratory, gastrointestinal, and esophageal candidiasis require an endoscopy to diagnose. For gastrointestinal candidiasis, it is necessary to obtain a 3–5 milliliter sample of fluid from the duodenum for fungal culture. The diagnosis of gastrointestinal candidiasis is based upon the culture containing exceeding 1,000 colony-forming units per milliliter.

=== Classification ===
Candidiasis may be divided into these types:

- Mucosal candidiasis
  - Oral candidiasis (thrush, oropharyngeal candidiasis)
    - Pseudomembranous candidiasis
    - Erythematous candidiasis
    - Hyperplastic candidiasis
    - Denture-related stomatitis — Candida organisms are involved in about 90% of cases
    - Angular cheilitis — Candida species are responsible for about 20% of cases, mixed infection of C. albicans and Staphylococcus aureus for about 60% of cases.
    - Median rhomboid glossitis
  - Candidal vulvovaginitis (vaginal yeast infection)
  - Candidal balanitis — infection of the glans penis, almost exclusively occurring in uncircumcised males
  - Esophageal candidiasis (candidal esophagitis)
  - Gastrointestinal candidiasis
  - Respiratory candidiasis
- Cutaneous candidiasis
  - Candidal folliculitis
  - Candidal intertrigo
  - Candidal paronychia
  - Perianal candidiasis, may present as pruritus ani
  - Candidid
  - Chronic mucocutaneous candidiasis
  - Congenital cutaneous candidiasis
  - Diaper candidiasis: an infection of a child's diaper area
  - Erosio interdigitalis blastomycetica
  - Candidal onychomycosis (nail infection) caused by Candida
- Systemic candidiasis
  - Candidemia, a form of fungemia which may lead to sepsis
  - Invasive candidiasis (disseminated candidiasis) — organ infection by Candida
  - Chronic systemic candidiasis (hepatosplenic candidiasis) — sometimes arises during recovery from neutropenia
- Antibiotic candidiasis (iatrogenic candidiasis)

== Prevention ==
A diet that supports the immune system and is low in simple carbohydrates contributes to a healthy balance of the oral and intestinal flora. While yeast infections are associated with diabetes, the level of blood sugar control may not affect the risk. Wearing cotton underwear may help to reduce the risk of developing skin and vaginal yeast infections, along with not wearing wet clothes for long periods. For women who experience recurrent yeast infections, there is limited evidence that oral or intravaginal probiotics help to prevent future infections. This includes either as pills or as yogurt.

Oral hygiene can help prevent oral candidiasis when people have a weakened immune system. For people undergoing cancer treatment, chlorhexidine mouthwash can prevent or reduce thrush. People who use inhaled corticosteroids can reduce the risk of developing oral candidiasis by rinsing the mouth with water or mouthwash after using the inhaler. People with dentures should also disinfect their dentures regularly to prevent oral candidiasis.

== Treatment ==
Candidiasis is treated with antifungal medications; these include clotrimazole, nystatin, fluconazole, voriconazole, amphotericin B, and echinocandins. Intravenous fluconazole or an intravenous echinocandin such as caspofungin are commonly used to treat immunocompromised or critically ill individuals.Other types of yeast like Kazachstania weizmannii are also shown to fight yeasts like C.albicans which cause Candidiasis though it is still being researched.

The 2016 revision of the clinical practice guideline for the management of candidiasis lists a large number of specific treatment regimens for Candida infections that involve different Candida species, forms of antifungal drug resistance, immune statuses, and infection localization and severity. Gastrointestinal candidiasis in immunocompetent individuals is treated with 100–200 mg fluconazole per day for 2–3 weeks.

=== Localized infection ===
Mouth and throat candidiasis are treated with antifungal medication. Oral candidiasis usually responds to topical treatments; otherwise, systemic antifungal medication may be indicated for oral infections. Candidal skin infections in the skin folds (candidal intertrigo) typically respond well to topical antifungal treatments (e.g., nystatin or miconazole). For breastfeeding mothers, topical miconazole is the most effective treatment for treating candidiasis on the breasts. Gentian violet can be used for thrush in breastfeeding babies. Systemic treatment with antifungals by mouth is reserved for severe cases or if treatment with topical therapy is unsuccessful. Candida esophagitis may be treated orally or intravenously. For severe or azole-resistant esophageal candidiasis, treatment with amphotericin B may be necessary.

Vaginal yeast infections are typically treated with topical antifungal agents. Penile yeast infections are also treated with antifungal agents, but while an internal treatment may be used (such as a pessary) for vaginal yeast infections, only external treatments – such as a cream – can be recommended for penile treatment. A one-time dose of fluconazole by mouth is 90% effective in treating a vaginal yeast infection. For severe nonrecurring cases, several doses of fluconazole is recommended. Local treatment may include vaginal suppositories or medicated douches. Other types of yeast infections require different dosing. C. albicans can develop resistance to fluconazole, this being more of an issue in those with HIV/AIDS who are often treated with multiple courses of fluconazole for recurrent oral infections.

For vaginal yeast infection in pregnancy, topical imidazole or triazole antifungals are considered the therapy of choice owing to available safety data. Systemic absorption of these topical formulations is minimal, posing little risk of transplacental transfer. In vaginal yeast infection in pregnancy, treatment with topical azole antifungals is recommended for seven days instead of a shorter duration.

For vaginal yeast infections, many complementary treatments are proposed; however, several have side effects. No benefit from probiotics has been found for active infections.

=== Blood-borne infection ===
Candidemia occurs when any Candida species infects the blood. Its treatment typically consists of oral or intravenous antifungal medications. Examples include intravenous fluconazole or an echinocandin such as caspofungin may be used. Amphotericin B is another option.

== Prognosis ==
In hospitalized patients who develop candidemia, age is an important prognostic factor. Mortality following candidemia is 50% in patients aged ≥75 years and 24% in patients aged <75 years. Among individuals being treated in intensive care units, the mortality rate is about 30–50% when systemic candidiasis develops.

== Epidemiology ==
Oral candidiasis is the most common fungal infection of the mouth, and it also represents the most common opportunistic oral infection in humans. Infections of the mouth occur in about 6% of babies less than a month old. About 20% of those receiving chemotherapy for cancer and 20% of those with AIDS also develop the disease.

It is estimated that 20% of women may be asymptomatically colonized by vaginal yeast. In the United States there are approximately 1.4 million doctor office visits every year for candidiasis. About three-quarters of women have at least one yeast infection at some time during their lives.

Esophageal candidiasis is the most common esophageal infection in persons with AIDS and accounts for about 50% of all esophageal infections, often coexisting with other esophageal diseases. About two-thirds of people with AIDS and esophageal candidiasis also have oral candidiasis.

Candidal sepsis is rare. Candida is the fourth most common cause of bloodstream infections among hospital patients in the United States. The incidence of bloodstream candida in intensive care units varies widely between countries.

== History ==
Descriptions of what sounds like oral thrush go back to the time of Hippocrates circa 460–370 BCE.

The first description of a fungus as the causative agent of an oropharyngeal and oesophageal candidosis was by Bernhard von Langenbeck in 1839.

Vulvovaginal candidiasis was first described in 1849 by Wilkinson. In 1875, Haussmann demonstrated that the causative organism in both vulvovaginal and oral candidiasis is the same.

With the advent of antibiotics following World War II, the rates of candidiasis increased. The rates then decreased in the 1950s following the development of nystatin.

The colloquial term "thrush" is of unknown origin but may stem from an unrecorded Old English word *þrusc or a Scandinavian root. The term is not related to the bird of the same name. The term candidosis is largely used in British English, and candidiasis in American English. Candida is also pronounced differently; in American English, the stress is on the "i", whereas in British English the stress is on the first syllable.

The genus Candida and species C. albicans were described by botanist Christine Marie Berkhout in her doctoral thesis at the University of Utrecht in 1923. Over the years, the classification of the genera and species has evolved. Obsolete names for this genus include Mycotorula and Torulopsis. The species has also been known in the past as Monilia albicans and Oidium albicans. The current classification is nomen conservandum, which means the name is authorized for use by the International Botanical Congress (IBC).

The genus Candida includes about 150 different species. However, only a few are known to cause human infections. C. albicans is the most significant pathogenic species. Other species pathogenic in humans include C. auris, C. tropicalis, C. parapsilosis, C. dubliniensis, and C. lusitaniae.

The name Candida was proposed by Berkhout. It is from the Latin word toga candida, referring to the white toga (robe) worn by candidates for the Senate of the ancient Roman republic. The specific epithet albicans also comes from Latin, albicare meaning "to whiten". These names refer to the generally white appearance of Candida species when cultured.

== Alternative medicine ==
A 2005 publication noted that "a large pseudoscientific cult"^{[wrong source]} has developed around the topic of Candida, with claims stating that up to one in three people are affected by yeast-related illness, particularly a condition called "Candidiasis hypersensitivity". Some practitioners of alternative medicine have promoted these purported conditions and sold dietary supplements as supposed cures; a number of them have been prosecuted. In 1990, alternative health vendor Nature's Way signed an FTC consent agreement not to misrepresent in advertising any self-diagnostic test concerning yeast conditions or to make any unsubstantiated representation concerning any food or supplement's ability to control yeast conditions, with a fine of $30,000 payable to the National Institutes of Health for research in genuine candidiasis.

== Research ==
High level Candida colonization is linked to several diseases of the gastrointestinal tract including Crohn's disease.

There has been an increase in resistance to antifungals worldwide over the past 30–40 years.
