= Fluconazole =

Antifungal medication

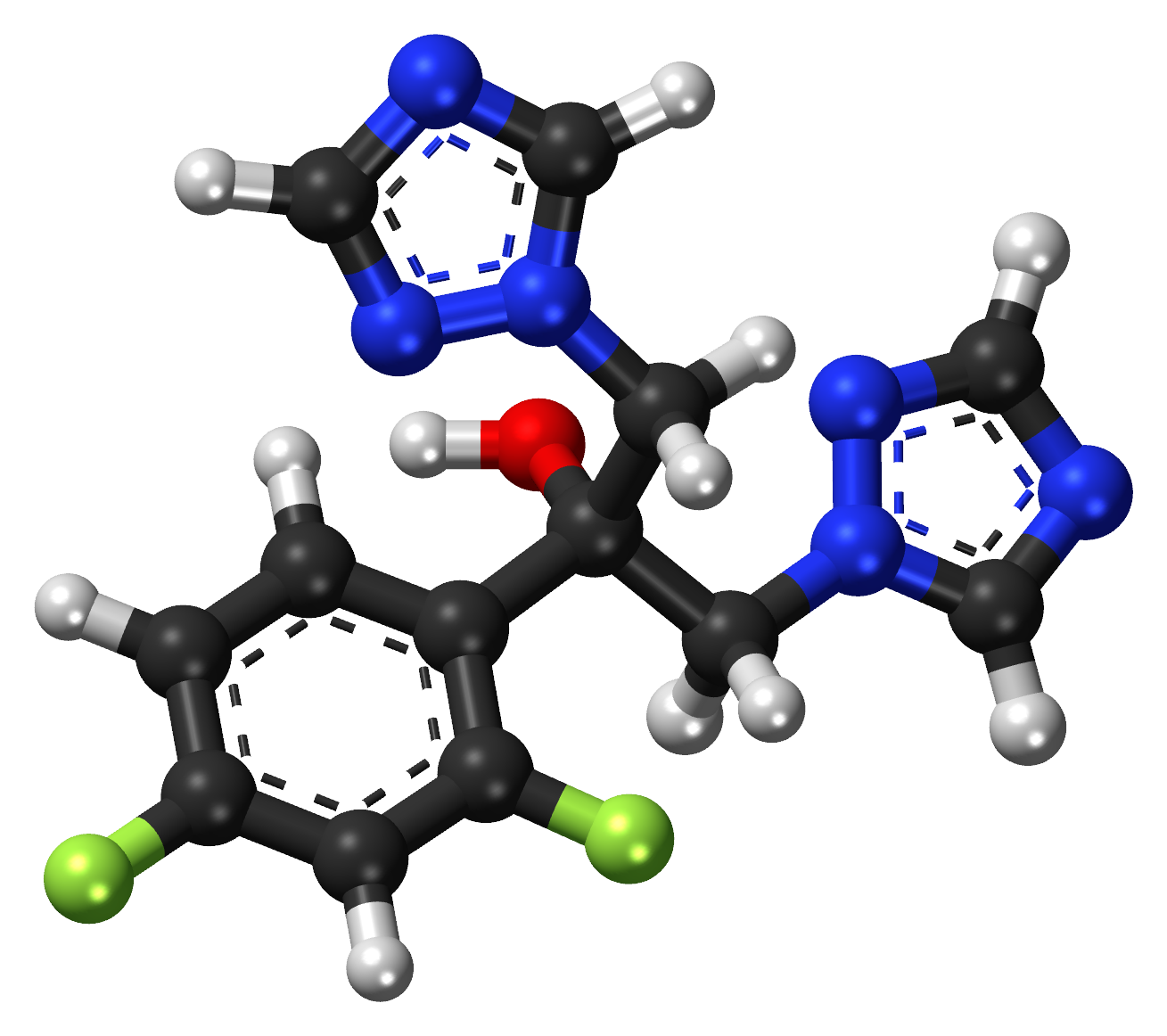

Clinical data
- Trade names: Diflucan, others
- AHFS/Drugs.com: Monograph
- MedlinePlus: a690002
- License data: US DailyMed: Fluconazole
- Pregnancy category: AU: D
- Routes of administration: By mouth, intravenous, topical
- ATC code: D01AC15 (WHO) J02AC01 (WHO), J01RA07 (WHO)

Legal status
- Legal status: AU: S3 (Pharmacist only) / S4; CA: ℞-only / OTC; UK: POM (Prescription only); US: ℞-only; EU: Rx-only

Pharmacokinetic data
- Bioavailability: >90% (oral)
- Protein binding: 11–12%
- Metabolism: Liver 11%
- Elimination half-life: 30 hours (range 20–50 hours)
- Excretion: Kidney 61–88%

Identifiers
- IUPAC name: 2-(2,4-Difluorophenyl)-1,3-bis(1H-1,2,4-triazol-1-yl)propan-2-ol
- CAS Number: 86386-73-4
- PubChem CID: 3365
- DrugBank: DB00196
- ChemSpider: 3248
- UNII: 8VZV102JFY
- KEGG: D00322; C07002
- ChEBI: CHEBI:46081
- ChEMBL: ChEMBL106
- CompTox Dashboard (EPA): DTXSID3020627
- ECHA InfoCard: 100.156.133

Chemical and physical data
- Formula: C_{13}H_{12}F_{2}N_{6}O
- Molar mass: 306.277 g·mol^{−1}
- 3D model (JSmol): Interactive image
- Melting point: 139 °C (282 °F)
- SMILES: OC(Cn1cncn1)(Cn1cncn1)c1ccc(F)cc1F
- InChI: InChI=1S/C13H12F2N6O/c14-10-1-2-11(12(15)3-10)13(22,4-20-8-16-6-18-20)5-21-9-17-7-19-21/h1-3,6-9,22H,4-5H2; Key:RFHAOTPXVQNOHP-UHFFFAOYSA-N

Fluconazole, sold under the brand name Diflucan among others, is an antifungal medication used for a number of fungal infections. These include candidiasis, blastomycosis, coccidioidomycosis, cryptococcosis, histoplasmosis, dermatophytosis, and tinea versicolor. It is also used to prevent candidiasis in those who are at high risk such as following organ transplantation, low birth weight babies, and those with low blood neutrophil counts. It is given either by mouth or by injection into a vein.

== Side effects and mechanism ==
Common side effects include vomiting, diarrhea, rash, and increased liver enzymes. Serious side effects may include liver problems, QT prolongation, and seizures. Use during pregnancy may increase the risk of miscarriage or birth defects. Fluconazole is in the azole antifungal family of medication. It is believed to work by affecting the fungal cellular membrane.

== History and culture ==
Fluconazole was patented in 1981 and came into commercial use in 1988. It is on the World Health Organization's List of Essential Medicines. Fluconazole is available as a generic medication. In 2023, it was the 175th most commonly prescribed medication in the United States, with more than 2 million prescriptions.

== Medical uses ==
Fluconazole is a first-generation triazole antifungal medication. It differs from earlier azole antifungals (such as ketoconazole) in that its structure contains a triazole ring instead of an imidazole ring. While the imidazole antifungals are mainly used topically, fluconazole and certain other triazole antifungals are preferred when systemic treatment is required because of their improved safety and predictable absorption when administered orally.

Fluconazole's spectrum of activity includes most species causing Candidiasis (but not Pichia kudriavzevii or Nakaseomyces glabratus, formerly known as Candida krusei and C. glabrata), Cryptococcus neoformans, some dimorphic fungi, and dermatophytes, among others. Common uses include:

- The treatment of non-systemic Candida infections of the vagina ("yeast infections"), throat, and mouth.
- Certain systemic Candida infections in people with healthy immune systems, including infections of the bloodstream, kidney, or joints. Other antifungals are usually preferred when the infection is in the heart or central nervous system, and for the treatment of active infections in people with weak immune systems.
- The prevention of Candida infections in people with weak immune systems, such as those neutropenic due to cancer chemotherapy, those with advanced HIV infections, transplant patients, and premature infants.
- As a second-line agent for the treatment of cryptococcal meningoencephalitis, a fungal infection of the central nervous system.

=== Resistance ===
Antifungal resistance to drugs in the azole class tends to occur gradually over the course of prolonged drug therapy, resulting in clinical failure in immunocompromised patients (e.g., patients with advanced HIV receiving treatment for thrush or esophageal Candida infection).

In C. albicans, resistance occurs by way of mutations in the ERG11 gene, which codes for 14α-demethylase. These mutations prevent the azole drug from binding, while still allowing binding of the enzyme's natural substrate, lanosterol. Development of resistance to one azole in this way will confer resistance to all drugs in the class. Another resistance mechanism employed by both C. albicans and C. glabrata is increasing the rate of efflux of the azole drug from the cell, by both ATP-binding cassette and major facilitator superfamily transporters. Other gene mutations are also known to contribute to development of resistance. C. glabrata develops resistance by up regulating CDR genes, and resistance in C. krusei is mediated by reduced sensitivity of the target enzyme to inhibition by the agent.

The full spectrum of fungal susceptibility and resistance to fluconazole can be found in the product data sheet. According to the US Centers for Disease Control and Prevention, fluconazole resistance among Candida strains in the US is about 7%.

=== Combating resistance ===
Rising resistance raises concerns since fluconazole is commonly used due to its inexpensiveness and ease of administration, according to the World Health Organization.

One possible solution to counter the increasing prevalence of Candida infections is combination antifungal therapy, combining natural components with commercial antifungal drugs to combat resistance.

Another possible solution is the integration of phage therapy, which has shown successive results in functional therapies. Phages, viruses that infect microbes including fungi, exhibit potent antimicrobial effects against various resistant fungal strains, demonstrating remarkable specificity and efficacy.

== Contraindications ==
Fluconazole is contraindicated in patients who:

- Drink alcohol
- have known hypersensitivity to other azole medicines such as ketoconazole;
- take terfenadine
- take quinidine
- take SSRIs such as fluoxetine or sertraline

== Side effects ==
Adverse drug reactions associated with fluconazole therapy include:

- Common (≥1% of patients): rash, headache, dizziness, nausea, vomiting, abdominal pain, diarrhea, and/or elevated liver enzymes
- Infrequent (0.1–1% of patients): anorexia, fatigue, constipation
- Rare (<0.1% of patients): oliguria, hypokalaemia, paraesthesia, seizures, alopecia, Stevens–Johnson syndrome, thrombocytopenia, other blood dyscrasias, serious hepatotoxicity including liver failure, anaphylactic/anaphylactoid reactions
- Very rare: prolonged QT interval, torsades de pointes
- In 2011, the US FDA reports that treatment with chronic, high doses of fluconazole during the first trimester of pregnancy may be associated with a rare and distinct set of birth defects in infants.

If taken during pregnancy it may result in harm. These cases of harm, however, were only in women who took large doses for most of the first trimester.

Fluconazole is secreted in human milk at concentrations similar to plasma.

Fluconazole therapy has been associated with QT interval prolongation, which may lead to serious cardiac arrhythmias. Thus, it is used with caution in patients with risk factors for prolonged QT interval, such as electrolyte imbalance or use of other drugs that may prolong the QT interval (particularly cisapride and pimozide).

Some people are allergic to azoles, so those allergic to other azole drugs might be allergic to fluconazole. That is, some azole drugs have adverse side-effects. Some azole drugs may disrupt estrogen production in pregnancy, affecting pregnancy outcome.

Oral fluconazole is not associated with a significantly increased risk of birth defects overall, although it does increase the odds ratio of tetralogy of Fallot, but the absolute risk is still low. Women using fluconazole during pregnancy have a 50% higher risk of spontaneous abortion.

Fluconazole should not be taken with cisapride (Propulsid) due to the possibility of serious, even fatal, heart problems. In rare cases, severe allergic reactions including anaphylaxis may occur.

Powder for oral suspension contains sucrose and should not be used in patients with hereditary fructose, glucose/galactose malabsorption or sucrase-isomaltase deficiency. Capsules contain lactose and thus should not be given to patients with glucose-galactose malabsorption.

== Interactions ==
Fluconazole is an inhibitor of the human cytochrome P450 system, particularly the isozyme CYP2C19 (CYP3A4 and CYP2C9 to lesser extent) In theory, therefore, fluconazole decreases the metabolism and increases the concentration of any drug metabolised by these enzymes. In addition, its potential effect on QT interval increases the risk of cardiac arrhythmia if used concurrently with other drugs that prolong the QT interval. Berberine has been shown to exert synergistic effects with fluconazole even in drug-resistant Candida albicans infections. Fluconazole may increase the serum concentration of Erythromycin (Risk X: avoid combination).

== Pharmacology ==
=== Pharmacodynamics ===
Like other imidazole- and triazole-class antifungals, fluconazole inhibits the fungal cytochrome P450 enzyme 14α-demethylase. Mammalian demethylase activity is much less sensitive to fluconazole than fungal demethylase. This inhibition prevents the conversion of lanosterol to ergosterol, an essential component of the fungal cytoplasmic membrane, and subsequent accumulation of 14α-methyl sterols. Fluconazole is primarily fungistatic; however, it may be fungicidal against certain organisms in a dose-dependent manner, specifically Cryptococcus.

=== Pharmacokinetics ===
Following oral dosing, fluconazole is almost completely absorbed within two hours. Bioavailability is not significantly affected by the absence of stomach acid. Concentrations measured in the urine, tears, and skin are approximately 10 times the plasma concentration, whereas saliva, sputum, and vaginal fluid concentrations are approximately equal to the plasma concentration, following a standard dose range of between 100 mg and 400 mg per day. The elimination half-life of fluconazole follows zero order, and only 10% of elimination is due to metabolism, the remainder being excreted in urine and sweat. Patients with impaired renal function will be at risk of overdose.

In a bulk powder form, it appears as a white crystalline powder, and it is very slightly soluble in water and soluble in alcohol.

== History ==
Fluconazole was patented by Pfizer in 1981 in the United Kingdom and came into commercial use in 1988. Patent expirations occurred in 2004 and 2005.
