= Ellen Aline Fenner =

American botanist

Ellen Aline Fenner (born July 1888 in Huntington, West Virginia) was an American botanist and mycologist known for first describing the genus Mycotypha. The standard author abbreviation Fenner is used to indicate this person as the author when citing a botanical name.
