= Potato dextrose agar =

Microbial growth medium

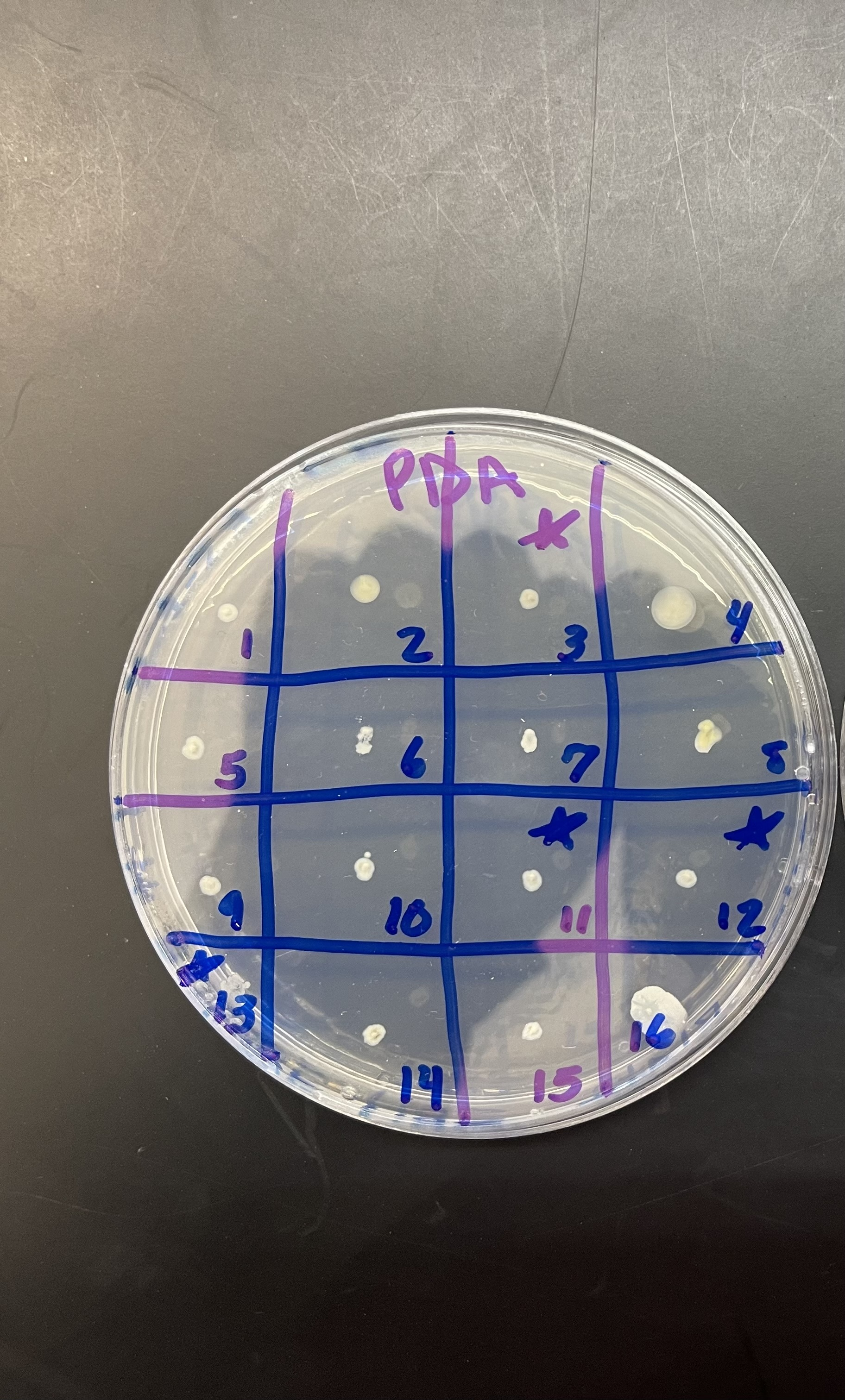
Master plate of bacterial soil isolates growing on potato dextrose agar.

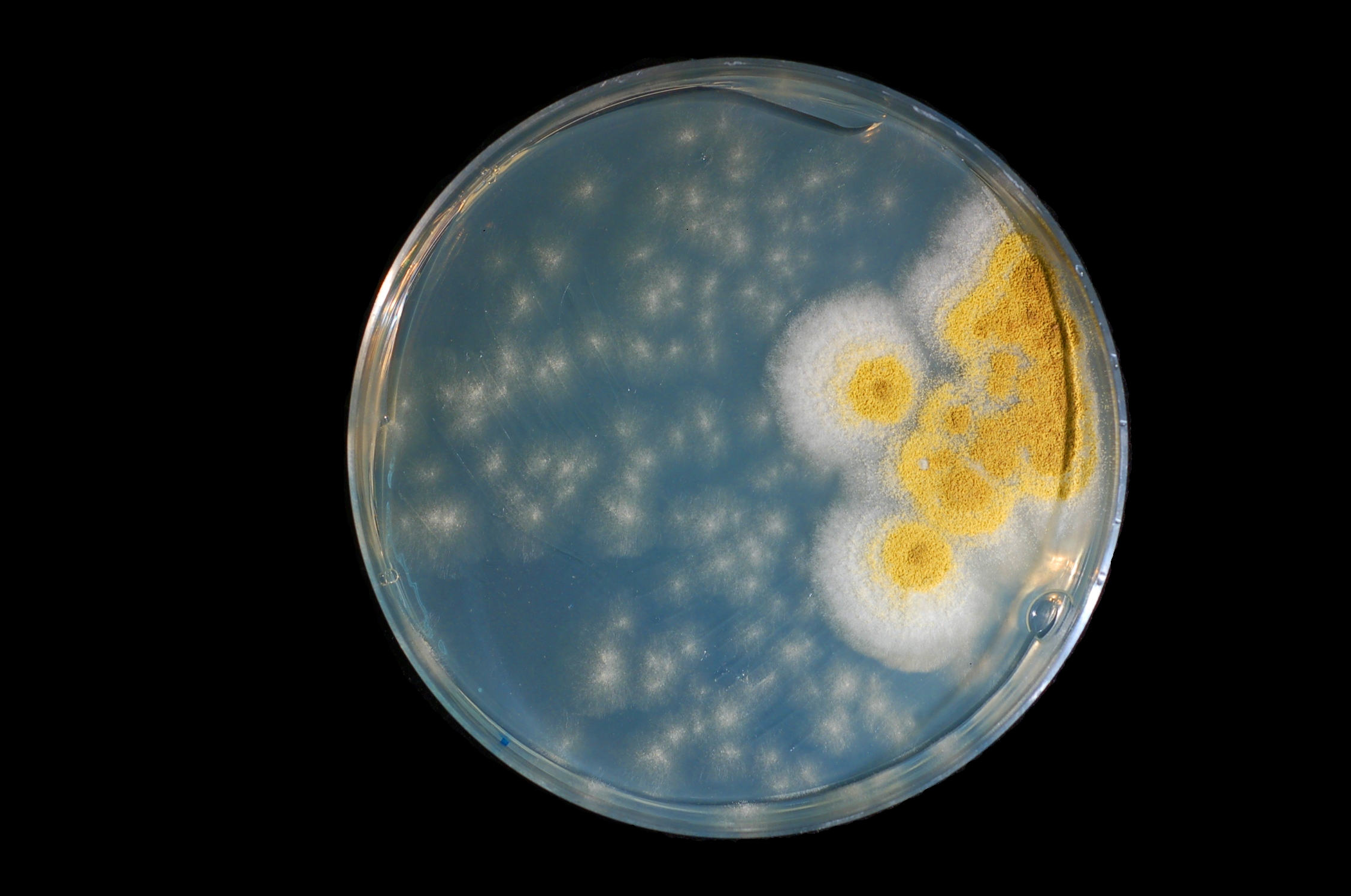
Aspergillus sp. growing in potato dextrose agar

Potato dextrose agar (BAM Media M127) and potato dextrose broth are common microbiological growth media made from potato infusion and dextrose. Potato dextrose agar (abbreviated "PDA") is the most widely used medium for growing fungi and bacteria.

PDA has the capability to culture various bacteria and fungi found in the soil. This agar can be acidified with an organic acid or loaded with antibiotics such as chloramphenicol to inhibit unwanted bacterial growth. PDA is used in the food industry to test for fungi that can spoil food products. It is also used in the pharmaceutical industry to screen compound libraries for potential antifungal agents.

Potato dextrose agar is a versatile growing medium for bacteria and fungi (yeasts and molds). This agar is used for a broad range of fungi but there are other agars that are more selective for specific types of fungi. These agars include but are not limited to malt extract agar and sabouraud agar. Malt extract agar is more acidic than PDA and is commonly used to cultivate penicillium species. Sabouraud agar is also slightly acidic with pH 5.6-6.0 which is similar to PDA. It is most often used for the isolation of pathogenic fungi such as dermatophytes.

== Typical composition ==
value	ingredients & conditions
1000 mL	water
(strained broth from 200 g of infused potato into the water above)	potatoes (sliced washed unpeeled)
20 g	dextrose
20 g	agar powder
5.6±0.2	final pH
25°C	temperature

Potato infusion can be made by boiling 200 grams (7.1 oz) of sliced (washed but unpeeled) potatoes in ~ 1 liter (0.22 imp gal; 0.26 U.S. gal) distilled water for 30 minutes and then decanting or straining the broth through cheesecloth. Distilled water is added such that the total volume of the suspension is 1 liter (0.22 imp gal; 0.26 U.S. gal). 20 grams (0.71 oz) dextrose and 20 grams (0.71 oz) agar powder is then added and the medium is sterilized by autoclaving at 15 pounds per square inch (100 kPa) for 15 minutes.

A similar growth medium, potato dextrose broth (abbreviated "PDB"), is formulated identically to PDA, omitting the agar. Common organisms that can be cultured on PDB are yeasts such as Candida albicans and Saccharomyces cerevisiae and molds such as Aspergillus niger.
