= Aspergillus rugulosus =

Scientific classification
- Kingdom: Fungi
- Division: Ascomycota
- Class: Eurotiomycetes
- Order: Eurotiales
- Family: Aspergillaceae
- Genus: Aspergillus
- Species: A. rugulosus

Binomial name
- Aspergillus rugulosus Thom & Raper (1939)

Species of fungus

Aspergillus rugulosus is a species of fungus in the genus Aspergillus. It is from the Nidulantes section. The species was first described in 1939. It has been isolated from soil in New Jersey, United States. It has been reported to produce sterigmatocystin, arugosin A, arugosin B, arugosin C, asperthecin, aspertetronin A, aspertetronin B, cyclo-L-isoleucyl-L-proline, cyclo-L-leucyl-L-proline, cyclo-L- valyl-L-proline, desferritriacetylfusigen, 3,30-Dihydroxy-5,50-dimethyldiphenyl ether, 2,4-dihydroxy-6- (hydroxymethyl)-benzaldehyde, 2,4-dihydroxy-6- methylbenzaldehyde, 2,4-dihydroxy-6-(hydroxymethyl)-benzaldehyde, echinocandin B, echinocandin C, echinocandin D, epishamixanthone, shamixanthone, 14-Hydroxytajixanthone 25-O-acetate, 14- Methoxytajixanthone 25-O-acetate, 14-Methoxytajixanthone, orsellinaldehyde, penicillin G, and ruguloxanthone.
