= 1,3-Beta-glucan synthase =

Class of enzymes

Identifiers
- EC no.: 2.4.1.34
- CAS no.: 9037-30-3
- Alt. names: GS-II, paramylon synthetase, callose synthase

Databases
- BRENDA: enzyme data
- ExPASy: NiceZyme view
- KEGG: enzyme entry
- MetaCyc: metabolic pathway
- Rhea: reactions
- PDB structures: RCSB PDB PDBe PDBsum
Search
- PMC: articles
- PubMed: articles
- NCBI: proteins

Glycosyl transferase, family 48 (GT48)

Identifiers
- Symbol: Glucan_synthase
- Pfam: PF02364
- Pfam clan: CL0111
- InterPro: IPR003440
- CAZy: GT48
Available protein structures:
- PDB: IPR003440 PF02364 (ECOD; PDBsum)
- AlphaFold: IPR003440; PF02364

1,3-Beta-glucan synthase is a glucosyltransferase enzyme involved in the generation of beta-glucan in fungi. It serves as a pharmacological target for antifungal drugs such as caspofungin, anidulafungin, and micafungin, deemed 1,3-Beta-glucan synthase inhibitors. Under the CAZy classification system, fungi and plant members fall in the glycosyltransferase 48 family (GT48). Some members of the glycosyltransferase 2 family (Pfam PF13632), such as the curdlan synthase CrdS (Q9X2V0), also has a similar activity.

The biosynthesis of disaccharides, oligosaccharides, and polysaccharides involves the action of hundreds of different glycosyltransferases. These enzymes catalyse the transfer of sugar moieties from activated donor molecules to specific acceptor molecules, forming glycosidic bonds.

The family consists of various 1,3-beta-glucan synthase components including Gls1, Gls2, and Gls3 from yeast. 1,3-Beta-glucan synthase (EC 2.4.1.34.) also known as callose synthase catalyses the formation of a beta-1,3-glucan polymer that is a major component of the fungal cell wall. The reaction catalysed is:

UDP-glucose + {(1,3)-beta-D-glucosyl}(N) = UDP + {(1,3)-beta-D-glucosyl}(N+1).

== See also ==
- Echinocandin
- glucan
