= Echinocandin B =

Names
- IUPAC name (9Z,12Z)-N-{(2R,6S,9R,11R,12R,14aS,16R,20S,23S,25aS)-23-[(1S,2S)-1,2-Dihydroxy-2-(4-hydroxyphenyl)ethyl]-2,11,12-trihydroxy-6,20-bis[(1R)-1-hydroxyethyl]-16-methyl-5,8,14,19,22,25-hexaoxotetracosahydro-1H-dipyrrolo[2,1-c:2',1'-l][1,4,7,10,13,16]hexaazacyclohenicosin-9-yl}-9,12-octadecadienamide

Identifiers
CAS Number	54651-05-7
3D model (JSmol)	Interactive image
ChemSpider	28296438
ECHA InfoCard	100.184.852
MeSH	echinocandin+B
PubChem CID	6436199
UNII	CNW0ZW8ZTQ
CompTox Dashboard (EPA)	DTXSID301027535
- InChI: InChI=1S/C52H81N7O15/c1-5-6-7-8-9-10-11-12-13-14-15-16-17-18-19-20-40(65)53-36-27-39(64)49(71)57-48(70)37-25-30(2)28-58(37)51(73)42(32(4)61)55-50(72)43(45(67)44(66)33-21-23-34(62)24-22-33)56-47(69)38-26-35(63)29-59(38)52(74)41(31(3)60)54-46(36)68/h9-10,12-13,21-24,30-32,35-39,41-45,49,60-64,66-67,71H,5-8,11,14-20,25-29H2,1-4H3,(H,53,65)(H,54,68)(H,55,72)(H,56,69)(H,57,70)/b10-9-,13-12-/t30-,31-,32-,35-,36-,37+,38+,39-,41+,42+,43+,44+,45+,49-/m1/s1 Key: VEYRWWIYQJAHTA-LUIZREEVSA-N
- SMILES: CCCCC/C=C\C/C=C\CCCCCCCC(=O)N[C@@H]1C[C@H]([C@H](NC(=O)[C@@H]2C[C@H](CN2C(=O)[C@@H](NC(=O)[C@@H](NC(=O)[C@@H]3C[C@H](CN3C(=O)[C@@H](NC1=O)[C@@H](C)O)O)[C@@H]([C@H](c4ccc(cc4)O)O)O)[C@@H](C)O)C)O)O

Properties
Chemical formula	C_{52}H_{81}N_{7}O_{16}
Molar mass	1060.24 g/mol
- Except where otherwise noted, data are given for materials in their standard state (at 25 °C [77 °F], 100 kPa). verify (what is ?) Infobox references

Echinocandin B, a lipopeptide, is a naturally occurring cyclic hexapeptide with a linoleoyl side chain. It belongs to a class of antifungal agents called echinocandins, which inhibits the synthesis of glucan, a major component of the fungal cell wall, via noncompetitive inhibition of a crucial enzyme, β-(1→3)-D-glucan synthase. Echinocandin B is a fermentation product of Aspergillus nidulans and the closely related species, A. rugulosus; discovered in 1974 in A. nidulans var. echinulatus strain A 32204 in Germany, it was the first of the echinocandin class of antifungals.

Echinocandin B can undergo deacylation (removal of the lipid side chain) by the action of a deacylase enzyme from the filamentous bacterium Actinoplanes utahensis, which catalyzes the cleavage of the linoleoyl side chain; in three subsequent synthetic steps, including a chemical reacylation, the antifungal drug anidulafungin is synthesized.
