= Aspergillus microthecius =

Scientific classification
- Kingdom: Fungi
- Division: Ascomycota
- Class: Eurotiomycetes
- Order: Eurotiales
- Family: Aspergillaceae
- Genus: Aspergillus
- Species: A. microthecius

Binomial name
- Aspergillus microthecius Samson & W. Gams (1985)

Synonyms
- Aspergillus quadrilineatus

Species of fungus

Aspergillus microthecius (also named Aspergillus quadrilineatus) is a species of fungus in the genus Aspergillus. It is from the Nidulantes section. The species was first described in 1985. It has been reported to produce asperthecin, averufin, 7-methoxyaverufin, sterigmatocystin, versicolourin, desferritriacetylfusigen, echinocandin B, echinocandin E, emericellin, emestrin, aurantioemestrin, dethiosecoemestrin, emindol DA, microperfuranone, penicillin G, quadrilineatin, and sterigmatocystin.
