= Cilofungin =

Names
- IUPAC name N-[(11R,20R,21R,25S,26S)-6-[(1S,2S)-1,2-Dihydroxy-2-(4-hydroxyphenyl)ethyl]-11,20,21,25-tetrahydroxy-3,15-bis(1-hydroxyethyl)-26-methyl-2,5,8,14,17,23-hexaoxo-1,4,7,13,16,22-hexaazatricyclo[22.3.0.0^{9,13}]heptacosan-18-yl]-4-(octyloxy)benzamide
- Other names 1-[(4R,5R)-4,5-Dihydroxy-N^{2}-[p-(octyloxy)benzoyl]-L-ornithine]echinocandin B (4R,5R)-4,5-Dihydroxy-N^{2}-[p-(octyloxy)benzoyl]-L-ornithyl-L-threonyl-trans-4-hydroxy-L-prolyl-(S)-4-hydroxy-4-(p-hydroxyphenyl)-L-threonyl-L-threonyl-(3S,4S)-3-hydroxy-4-methyl-L-proline cyclic (6→1)-peptide

Identifiers
| CAS Number | 79404-91-4 |
| 3D model (JSmol) | Interactive image |
| ChEMBL | ChEMBL2103748 |
| ChemSpider | 5293334 |
| MeSH | Cilofungin |
| PubChem CID | 6918120 |
| UNII | 8ZJC54A39X |
| CompTox Dashboard (EPA) | DTXSID901027438 |
- InChI: InChI=1S/C49H71N7O17/c1-5-6-7-8-9-10-19-73-31-17-13-28(14-18-31)42(65)50-32-21-34(61)45(68)54-47(70)38-39(62)24(2)22-56(38)49(72)36(26(4)58)52-46(69)37(41(64)40(63)27-11-15-29(59)16-12-27)53-44(67)33-20-30(60)23-55(33)48(71)35(25(3)57)51-43(32)66/h11-18,24-26,30,32-41,45,57-64,68H,5-10,19-23H2,1-4H3,(H,50,65)(H,51,66)(H,52,69)(H,53,67)(H,54,70)/t24-,25+,26+,30+,32-,33-,34+,35-,36-,37-,38-,39-,40-,41-,45+/m0/s1 Key: ZKZKCEAHVFVZDJ-MTUMARHDSA-N; InChI=1/C49H71N7O17/c1-5-6-7-8-9-10-19-73-31-17-13-28(14-18-31)42(65)50-32-21-34(61)45(68)54-47(70)38-39(62)24(2)22-56(38)49(72)36(26(4)58)52-46(69)37(41(64)40(63)27-11-15-29(59)16-12-27)53-44(67)33-20-30(60)23-55(33)48(71)35(25(3)57)51-43(32)66/h11-18,24-26,30,32-41,45,57-64,68H,5-10,19-23H2,1-4H3,(H,50,65)(H,51,66)(H,52,69)(H,53,67)(H,54,70)/t24-,25+,26+,30+,32-,33-,34+,35-,36-,37-,38-,39-,40-,41-,45+/m0/s1 Key: ZKZKCEAHVFVZDJ-MTUMARHDBF
- SMILES: O=C2N5[C@H](C(=O)N[C@H](O)[C@H](O)C[C@H](NC(=O)c1ccc(OCCCCCCCC)cc1)C(=O)N[C@H](C(=O)N4[C@H](C(=O)N[C@H](C(=O)N[C@H]2[C@H](O)C)[C@H](O)[C@@H](O)c3ccc(O)cc3)C[C@@H](O)C4)[C@H](O)C)[C@@H](O)[C@@H](C)C5

Properties
| Chemical formula | C_{49}H_{71}N_{7}O_{17} |
| Molar mass | 1030.12474 |
- Except where otherwise noted, data are given for materials in their standard state (at 25 °C [77 °F], 100 kPa). verify (what is ?) Infobox references

Cilofungin (INN) is the first clinically applied member of the echinocandin family of antifungal drugs. It was derived from a fungus in the genus Aspergillus. It accomplishes this by interfering with an invading fungus' ability to synthesize the cell wall (specifically, it inhibits the synthesis of (1→3)-β-D-glucan).
