= Synthase =

Enzyme that catalyses a synthesis process

In biochemistry, a synthase is an enzyme that catalyses a synthesis process.

Originally, biochemical nomenclature distinguished synthetases and synthases. Under the original definition, synthases do not use energy from nucleoside triphosphates (such as ATP, GTP, CTP, TTP, and UTP), whereas synthetases do use nucleoside triphosphates. However, the Joint Commission on Biochemical Nomenclature (JCBN) dictates that 'synthase' can be used with any enzyme that catalyzes synthesis (whether or not it uses nucleoside triphosphates), whereas 'synthetase' is to be used synonymously with 'ligase'.

== Examples ==
- ATP synthase
- Citrate synthase
- Tryptophan synthase
- Pseudouridine synthase
- Fatty acid synthase
- Cellulose synthase (UDP-forming)
- Cellulose synthase (GDP-forming)
