= Pneumocandin B0 =

Pneumocandin B_{0}

Names
- IUPAC name N-{(2R,6S,9S,11R,12R,14aS,15S,20S,23S,25aS)-20-[(1S)-3-Amino-1-hydroxy-3-oxopropyl]-23-[(1S,2S)-1,2-dihydroxy-2-(4-hydroxyphenyl)ethyl]-2,11,12,15-tetrahydroxy-6-[(1S)-1-hydroxyethyl]-5,8,14,19,22,25-hexaoxotetracosahydro-1H-dipyrrolo[2,1-c:2',1'-l][1,4,7,10,13,16]hexaazacyclohenicosin-9-yl}-10,12-dimethyltetradecanamide
- Other names CHEMBL269311; 135575-42-7; Pneumocandin B_{0}; Hydroxy Echinocandin; SCHEMBL8444763

Identifiers
| CAS Number | 135575-42-7 |
| 3D model (JSmol) | Interactive image |
| ChEMBL | ChEMBL269311 |
| ChemSpider | 17276932 |
| ECHA InfoCard | 100.157.925 |
| PubChem CID | 5742645 |
| UNII | BA795CZ3I2 |
- InChI: InChI=1S/C50H80N8O17/c1-5-25(2)20-26(3)12-10-8-6-7-9-11-13-37(66)52-31-22-35(64)46(71)56-48(73)41-33(62)18-19-57(41)50(75)39(34(63)23-36(51)65)54-47(72)40(43(68)42(67)28-14-16-29(60)17-15-28)55-45(70)32-21-30(61)24-58(32)49(74)38(27(4)59)53-44(31)69/h14-17,25-27,30-35,38-43,46,59-64,67-68,71H,5-13,18-24H2,1-4H3,(H2,51,65)(H,52,66)(H,53,69)(H,54,72)(H,55,70)(H,56,73)/t25?,26?,27-,30-,31+,32+,33+,34-,35-,38+,39+,40+,41+,42+,43+,46-/m1/s1; Key: DQXPFAADCTZLNL-ZESADUFFSA-N
- SMILES: CCC(C)CC(C)CCCCCCCCC(=O)N[C@H]1C[C@H]([C@H](NC(=O)[C@@H]2[C@H](CCN2C(=O)[C@@H](NC(=O)[C@@H](NC(=O)[C@@H]3C[C@H](CN3C(=O)[C@@H](NC1=O)[C@@H](C)O)O)[C@@H]([C@H](C4=CC=C(C=C4)O)O)O)[C@@H](CC(=O)N)O)O)O)O

Properties
| Chemical formula | C_{50}H_{80}N_{8}O_{17} |
| Molar mass | 1065.229 g·mol^{−1} |
| Appearance | White crystalline powder |
| Density | 1.411 g.cm^{−3} |
| Solubility in water | Soluble in ethanol, methanol, DMF or DMSO. Limited water solubility. |
| Refractive index (n_{D}) | 1.629 |
- Except where otherwise noted, data are given for materials in their standard state (at 25 °C [77 °F], 100 kPa). Infobox references

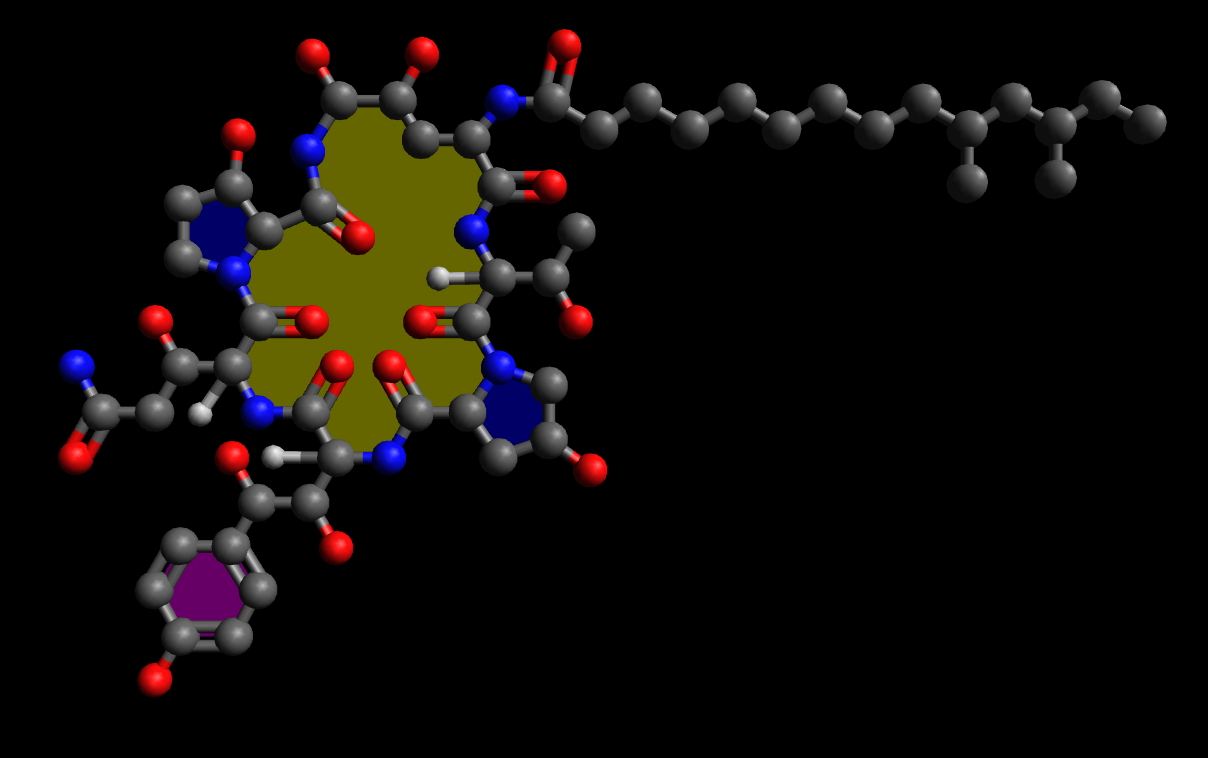
Pneumocandin B_{0} structure with oxygen, nitrogen, and carbon atoms shown in red, blue, and black, respectively

Pneumocandin B_{0}, also known as pneumocandin B0, pneumocandin B(0), and hydroxy echinocandin, is an organic chemical compound with the formula C_{50}H_{80}N_{8}O_{17}, produced by the fungus Glarea lozoyensis.

It is a strong antifungal and inhibits the synthesis of β-(1→3)-D-glucan, which is a fundamental component in most cell walls, like the Candida albicans membrane. This is a very important activity since there is an increase in the frequency of fungal infections, accompanied by an increase in the variety of opportunistic and pathogenic fungi such as Candida.

This compound is used to synthesize caspofungin.

Pneumocandin B_{0} can be easily confused with pneumocandin B, although they have different side chains and residues.

== Production ==
Pneumocandin B_{0} is the starting molecule for the first semisynthetic echinocandin antifungal drug, caspofungin acetate.

In the wild-type strain, pneumocandin B_{0} is a minor fermentation product, and its industrial production was achieved by a combination of extensive mutation and medium optimization.

The pneumocandin biosynthetic gene cluster was previously elucidated by a whole genome sequencing approach. Knowledge of the biosynthetic cluster suggested an alternative way to exclusively produce pneumocandin B_{0}.

Disruption of GLOXY4, encoding a nonheme, α-ketoglutarate-dependent oxygenase, confirmed its involvement in L-leucine cyclization to form (4S)-methyl-L-proline. The absence of (4S)-methyl-L-proline abolishes pneumocandin A_{0} production, and (3S)-hydroxyl-L-proline occupies the hexapeptide core's position 6, resulting in exclusive production of pneumocandin B_{0}.

Retrospective analysis of the GLOXY4 gene in a previously isolated pneumocandin B_{0}-exclusive mutant (ATCC 74030) indicated that chemical mutagenesis disrupted the GLOXY4 gene function by introducing two amino acid mutations in GLOXY4.

This one-step genetic manipulation can rationally engineer a high-yield production strain.

== Special features ==
The echinocandins and pneumocandins are lipopeptides antifungal agents that inhibit the synthesis of β-(1→3)-D-glucan, an essential cell wall homopolysaccharide found in many pathogenic fungi.

Compounds with this fungal-specific target have several attractive features:

- Lack of mechanism-based toxicity
- Potential for fungicidal activity
- Activity against strains with intrinsic or acquired resistance mechanisms for existing antimycotics.

== Caspofungin ==
Caspofungin, a semisynthetic derivate of the pneumocandin B_{0}, is the first licensed compound of a new class of antifungal agent, that are called the echinocandins. This antifungal agent attacks the fungal cell by selective inhibition of β-(1→3)-D-glucan synthase, which is not present in mammalian cells. Caspofungin represents an interesting and clinically valuable new antifungal drug that broadens the available therapeutic armamentarium for the treatment of invasive fungal infections.

== Semisynthetic derivatives ==
The antipneumocystis activities of the pneumocandins can be significantly improved through synthetic modification.

There are new semisynthetic pneumocandin B_{0} derivatives that have been found:

- By the addition of an aminoethyl ether at the R^{3} position of pneumocandin B_{0} resulted water-soluble and nonprodrug compounds, substantially more efficacious
- By the modification of pneumocandin B_{0} at the R^{2} position by the conversion of the hydroxyglutamine to a hydroxyornithine increases the antipneumocystis activities of the compounds by 4-fold.

These two modifications combined were synergistic, resulting in a 10-fold improvement in potency against Pneumocystis jirovecii (formerly known as Pneumocystis carinii) pneumonia.
