= Penicillium fennelliae =

Scientific classification
- Kingdom: Fungi
- Division: Ascomycota
- Class: Eurotiomycetes
- Order: Eurotiales
- Family: Aspergillaceae
- Genus: Penicillium
- Species: P. fennelliae

Binomial name
- Penicillium fennelliae Stolk, A.C. 1969

Type strain
- ATCC 22050, ATCC 52492, BCRC 32676, CBS 711.68, CCRC 32676, FRR 0521, IHEM 4389, MUCL 31322, MUCL 34650

Species of fungus

Penicillium fennelliae is an anamorph species of the genus of Penicillium which produces patulin, orsellinic acid and penicillinic acid.

== See also ==
- List of Penicillium species
