= C25H28O6 =

The molecular formula C_{25}H_{28}O_{6} (molar mass: 424.49 g/mol, exact mass: 424.1886 u) may refer to:

- Arugosin C
- Sophoraflavanone G
