= Penicillium madriti =

Scientific classification
- Kingdom: Fungi
- Division: Ascomycota
- Class: Eurotiomycetes
- Order: Eurotiales
- Family: Aspergillaceae
- Genus: Penicillium
- Species: P. madriti

Binomial name
- Penicillium madriti Smith, G. 1961

Type strain
- ATCC 18233, BB389, BCRC 31672, CBS 347.61, CCRC 31672, FRR 3452, IFO 9148, IHEM 5838, IMI 086563, KCTC 6415, LSHB BB389, LSHTM BB.389, MUCL 2456, MUCL 31193, NBRC 9148, NRRL 3452, NRRL A-11031, QM 7959

Synonyms
- Penicillium castellonense

Species of fungus

Penicillium madriti is an anamorph species of the genus of Penicillium which produces orsellinic acid.
