= Callose =

Plant cell wall polysaccharide

Names
- Other names (1→3)-β-D-Glucan

Identifiers
CAS Number	9064-51-1
ChEBI	CHEBI:37671

Properties
Chemical formula	(C_{6}H_{10}O_{5})_{n}
- Except where otherwise noted, data are given for materials in their standard state (at 25 °C [77 °F], 100 kPa). Infobox references

Callose is a plant polysaccharide. Its production is due to the glucan synthase-like gene (GLS) in various places within a plant. It is produced to act as a temporary cell wall in response to stimuli such as stress or damage. Callose is composed of glucose residues linked together through β-1,3-linkages, and is termed a β-glucan. It is thought to be manufactured at the cell wall by callose synthases and is degraded by β-1,3-glucanases. Callose is very important for the permeability of plasmodesmata (Pd) in plants; the plant's permeability is regulated by plasmodesmata callose (PDC). PDC is made by callose synthases and broken down by β-1,3-glucanases (BGs). The amount of callose that is built up at the plasmodesmatal neck, which is brought about by the interference of callose synthases (CalSs) and β-1,3-glucanases, determines the conductivity of the plasmodesmata.

== Formation and function ==
Callose is laid down at plasmodesmata, at the cell plate during cytokinesis, and during pollen development. Endothecium contains a substance callose, which makes it thicker. Callose is produced in response to wounding, infection by pathogens, aluminium, and abscisic acid. When there is wounding in the plant tissue, it is fixed by the deposition of callose at the plasmodesmata and cell wall; this process happens within minutes after damage. Even though callose is not a constitutional component of the plant's cell wall, it is related to the plant's defense mechanism. Deposits often appear on the sieve plates at the end of the growing season. Callose also forms immediately around the developing meiocytes and tetrads of sexually reproducing angiosperms but is not found in related apomictic taxa. Callose deposition at the cell wall has been suggested as an early marker for direct somatic embryogenesis from cortical and epidermal cells of Cichorium hybrids. Temporary callose walls are also thought to be a barrier between a cell and its environment, while the cell is undergoing a genetic programming that allows it to differentiate. This is because callose walls can be found around nucellar embryos during nucellar embryony.

== See also ==
- Curdlan
