= Orsellinaldehyde =

Names
- IUPAC name 2,4-Dihydroxy-6-methylbenzaldehyde
- Other names: Orcylaldehyde; Orcinaldehyde; Orcylic aldehyde; 6-Methyl-β-resorcyladehyde

Identifiers
CAS Number	487-69-4
3D model (JSmol)	Interactive image
ChEBI	CHEBI:155863
ChemSpider	220511
ECHA InfoCard	100.153.049
EC Number	624-460-2
PubChem CID	251690
UNII	15U7JE2JVK
CompTox Dashboard (EPA)	DTXSID70291004
- InChI: InChI=1S/C8H8O3/c1-5-2-6(10)3-8(11)7(5)4-9/h2-4,10-11H,1H3 Key: LJFQTUKKYWDRAT-UHFFFAOYSA-N
- SMILES: CC1=CC(=CC(=C1C=O)O)O

Properties
Chemical formula	C_{8}H_{8}O_{3}
Molar mass	152.149 g·mol^{−1}
Appearance	colourless
Melting point	181–183 °C (358–361 °F; 454–456 K)
Boiling point	321.9 °C (611.4 °F; 595.0 K)
- Except where otherwise noted, data are given for materials in their standard state (at 25 °C [77 °F], 100 kPa). Infobox references

Orsellinaldehyde is a dihydroxybenzaldehyde with a methyl side group. It can be classified as a resorcinol, benzaldehyde or toluene derivative. It is a natural product of several fungi. Fungi that contain it include Grifola frondosa, Aspergillus cleistominutus, Aspergillus nidulans, and Agrocybe praecox.

== Production ==
Orsellinaldehyde can be produced by a Gattermann reaction of orcinol, using zinc cyanide under a hydrogen chloride atmosphere, which adds an aldimine (-CH=NH) group to the ring, followed by hydrolysis to give the aldehyde.

== Properties ==
The melting point is between 181 and 183 °C.
