= Papulacandin B =

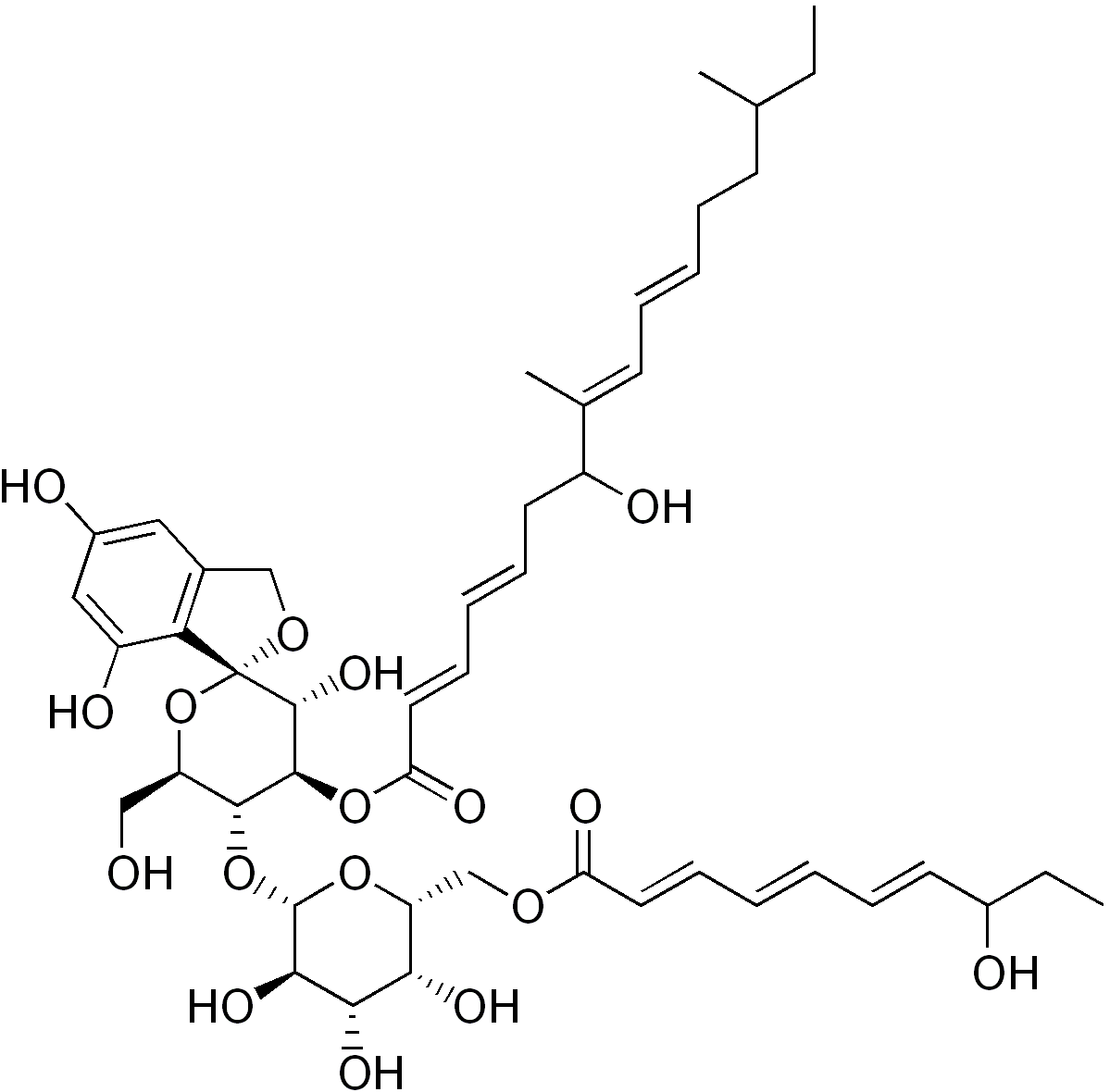

Identifiers
CAS Number	61032-80-2
3D model (JSmol)	Interactive image
ChemSpider	4940858
MeSH	Papulacandin+B
PubChem CID	6436198
- InChI: InChI=1S/C47H64O17/c1-5-28(3)17-11-9-12-18-29(4)33(51)20-14-10-16-22-38(54)62-44-43(35(25-48)64-47(45(44)58)39-30(26-60-47)23-32(50)24-34(39)52)63-46-42(57)41(56)40(55)36(61-46)27-59-37(53)21-15-8-7-13-19-31(49)6-2/h7-10,12-16,18-19,21-24,28,31,33,35-36,40-46,48-52,55-58H,5-6,11,17,20,25-27H2,1-4H3/b8-7+,12-9+,14-10+,19-13+,21-15+,22-16+,29-18+/t28?,31?,33?,35-,36-,40+,41+,42-,43-,44+,45-,46+,47+/m1/s1 Key: UJLFRJFJTPPIOK-DOERTBJDSA-N; InChI=1/C47H64O17/c1-5-28(3)17-11-9-12-18-29(4)33(51)20-14-10-16-22-38(54)62-44-43(35(25-48)64-47(45(44)58)39-30(26-60-47)23-32(50)24-34(39)52)63-46-42(57)41(56)40(55)36(61-46)27-59-37(53)21-15-8-7-13-19-31(49)6-2/h7-10,12-16,18-19,21-24,28,31,33,35-36,40-46,48-52,55-58H,5-6,11,17,20,25-27H2,1-4H3/b8-7+,12-9+,14-10+,19-13+,21-15+,22-16+,29-18+/t28?,31?,33?,35-,36-,40+,41+,42-,43-,44+,45-,46+,47+/m1/s1 Key: UJLFRJFJTPPIOK-DOERTBJDBI
- SMILES: CCC(C)CC/C=C/C=C(\C)/C(C/C=C/C=C/C(=O)O[C@H]1[C@@H]([C@H](O[C@]2([C@@H]1O)c3c(cc(cc3O)O)CO2)CO)O[C@H]4[C@@H]([C@H]([C@H]([C@H](O4)COC(=O)/C=C/C=C/C=C/C(CC)O)O)O)O)O

Properties
Chemical formula	C_{47}H_{64}O_{17}
Molar mass	901.00 g/mol
- Except where otherwise noted, data are given for materials in their standard state (at 25 °C [77 °F], 100 kPa). verify (what is ?) Infobox references

Papulacandin B is a papulacandin isolated from a strain of Papularia sphaerosperma. It is a molecule with antifungal activity.

== See also ==
- Echinocandin
