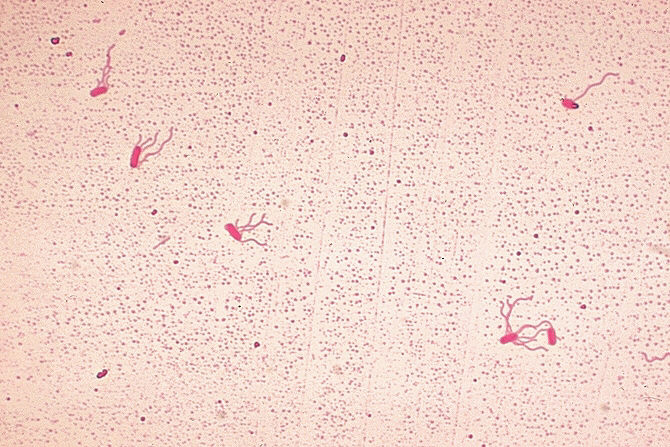
- Alcaligenes faecalis, flagella stain

Scientific classification
- Domain: Bacteria
- Kingdom: Pseudomonadati
- Phylum: Pseudomonadota
- Class: Betaproteobacteria
- Order: Burkholderiales
- Family: Alcaligenaceae
- Genus: Alcaligenes
- Species: A. faecalis

Binomial name
- Alcaligenes faecalis Castellani & Chalmers 1919

= Alcaligenes faecalis =

Species of bacterium

Alcaligenes faecalis is a species of Gram-negative, rod-shaped bacteria commonly found in the environment. It was originally named for its first discovery in feces, but was later found to be common in soil, water, and environments in association with humans. While opportunistic infections do occur, the bacterium is generally considered nonpathogenic. When an opportunistic infection does occur, it is usually observed in the form of a urinary tract infection.

A. faecalis has been used for the production of nonstandard amino acids.

== Description ==
A. faecalis is a Gram-negative bacterium which appears rod-shaped and motile under a microscope. It is positive by the oxidase test and catalase test, but negative by the nitrate reductase test. It is alpha-hemolytic and requires oxygen. A. faecalis can be grown at 37 °C, and forms colonies that lack pigmentation.

== Metabolism ==
The bacterium degrades urea, creating ammonia which increases the pH of the environment. Although A. faecalis is considered to be alkali-tolerant, it maintains a neutral pH in its cytosol to prevent the damaging or denaturing of its charged species and macromolecules.

== History ==
A. faecalis may have been isolated by Johannes Petruschky in 1896, and also described (and they state, the description corrected) in 1919 by Castellani and Chalmers.

There was some controversy about the morphology and smell of the organism in the 1960s. Separatedly in the 1960s, a curdlan-producing lineage of Agrobacterium fabrum was misidentied as "Alcaligenes faecalis var. myxogenes".

In 2001, previously unidentified isolates of Alcaligenes were classified as a new subspecies of A. faecalis: A. faecalis parafaecalis. In 2005, a second subspecies of A. faecalis was described: A. faecalis phenolicus. A. faecalis phenolicus is distinguished by its ability to use phenol as a carbon source.

== Research ==
In 2024, researcher Ellen White of the University of Pennsylvania found that Alcaligenes faecalis can help treat chronic wounds heal faster. White added A. faecalis to wounds on diabetic mice and to human skin samples from people with diabetes while adding A. faecalis. The results showed the wounds treated with the bacteria healed faster and produced keratinocytes.
