= Curdlan =

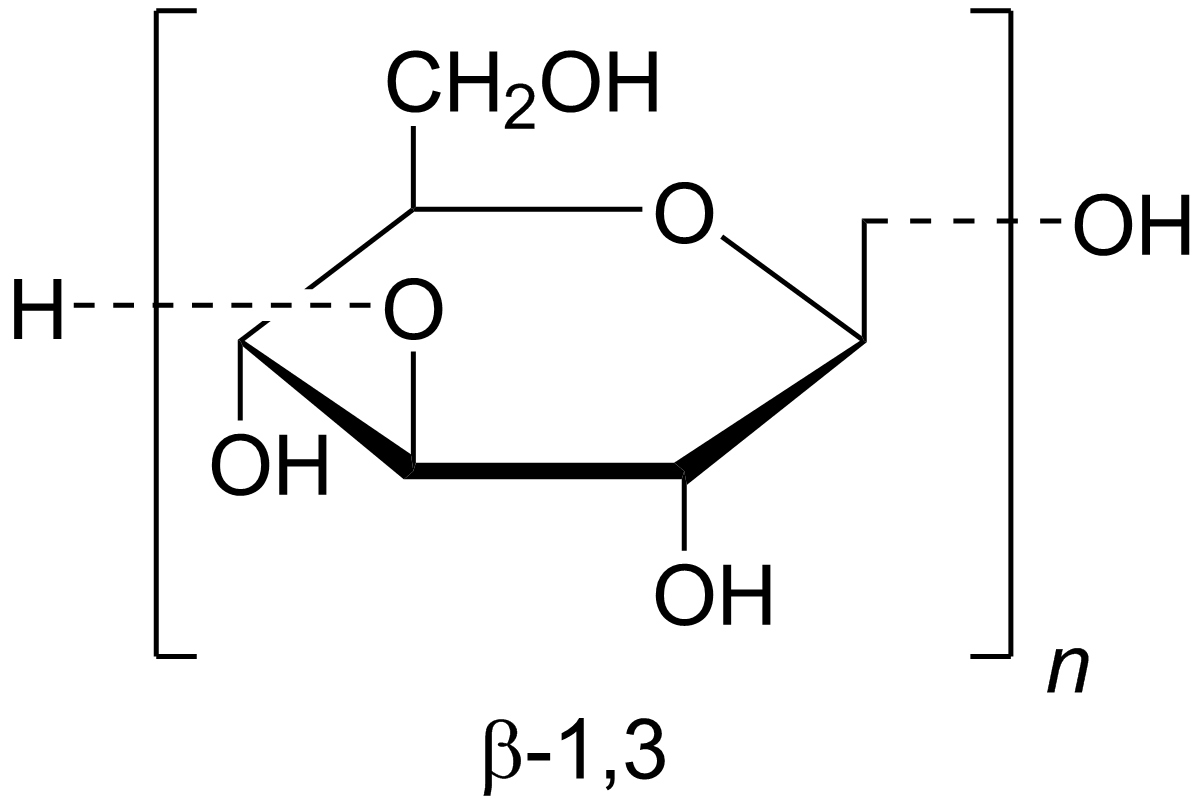

Identifiers
CAS Number	54724-00-4
ChemSpider	none
E number	E424 (thickeners, ...)
UNII	6930DL209R

Properties
Chemical formula	(C_{6}H_{10}O_{5})_{n}
Appearance	odourless white powder
- Except where otherwise noted, data are given for materials in their standard state (at 25 °C [77 °F], 100 kPa). verify (what is ?) Infobox references

Curdlan is a water-insoluble linear beta-1,3-glucan, a high-molecular-weight polymer of glucose. Curdlan consists of β-(1,3)-linked glucose residues and forms elastic gels upon heating in aqueous suspension.

It was initially reported to be produced by "Alcaligenes faecalis var. myxogenes" strain 10C3-K in 1966. This classification for the strain and its descendants is now understood to be inaccurate, giving rise to the new name "Agrobacterium fabrum". The modern industrial strain "A. fabrum" ATCC 31749 (Note: ATCC 31749 (KR1) is derived from ATCC 21680 (NTK-u), which is in turn derived from the original mutant K of 10C3. ATCC 31749 gave rise to a mutant ATCC 31750 (KR2).) had its genome sequenced in 2011. Some sources prefer the open nomenclature Agrobacterium sp.

Extracellular and capsular polysaccharides are produced by a variety of pathogenic and soil-dwelling bacteria. Curdlan is a neutral β-(1,3)-glucan, perhaps with a few intra- or interchain 1,6-linkages, produced as an exopolysaccharide by soil bacteria of the family Rhizobiaceae. It is also produced by Cellulomonas flavigena, which belongs to a different phylum.

== Biosynthesis ==
Four genes required for curdlan production have been identified in "A. fabrum" ATCC 31749, which produces curdlan in extraordinary amounts, and the closely related A. tumefaciens. A putative operon contains crdS (Q9X2V0, family GT2, Pfam PF13632), encoding β-(1,3)-glucan synthase catalytic subunit, flanked by two additional genes. A separate locus contains a putative regulatory gene, crdR. A membrane-bound phosphatidylserine synthase, encoded by pss_{AG}, is also necessary for maximal production of curdlan of high molecular mass. Nitrogen starvation upregulates the curdlan operon and increases the rate of curdlan synthesis.

== Applications ==
Curdlan has numerous applications as a gelling agent in the food, construction, and pharmaceutical industries and has been approved as a food additive by the U. S. Food and Drug Administration. Its use is being evaluated in fat replacement studies in foodstuffs such as sausages, meat patties and other meat products

== See also ==
- Callose
- Gellan gum
