= Beta-glucan =

Class of chemical compounds

Callose is an example of a (1→3)-β-D-glucan composed of glucose units

Beta-glucans, β-glucans comprise a group of β-D-glucose polysaccharides (glucans) naturally occurring in the cell walls of plants (including cereals), bacteria, algae and fungi, with significantly differing physicochemical properties dependent on source. Typically, β-glucans form a linear backbone with 1–3 β-glycosidic bonds but differ with respect to molecular mass, solubility, viscosity, branching structure, and gelation properties, with several physiological roles in these organisms and causing diverse physiological effects in any animals that consume them.

β-glucans are natural gums and are used as texturing agents in various nutraceutical and cosmetic products, and as soluble fiber supplements. At dietary intake levels of at least 3 g per day in humans, oat fiber β-glucan decreases blood levels of LDL cholesterol and so may reduce the risk of cardiovascular diseases.

== History ==
Cereal and fungal products have been used for centuries for medicinal and cosmetic purposes; however, the specific role of β-glucan was not explored until the 20th century. β-glucans were first discovered in lichens, and shortly thereafter in barley. A particular interest in oat β-glucan arose after a cholesterol lowering effect from oat bran reported in 1981.

In 1997, the FDA approved of a claim that intake of at least 3.0 g of β-glucan from oats per day decreased absorption of dietary cholesterol and reduced the risk of coronary heart disease. The approved health claim was later amended to include these sources of β-glucan: rolled oats (oatmeal), oat bran, whole oat flour, oatrim (the soluble fraction of alpha-amylase hydrolyzed oat bran or whole oat flour), whole grain barley and barley beta-fiber. An example of an allowed label claim: "Soluble fiber from foods such as oatmeal, as part of a diet low in saturated fat and cholesterol, may reduce the risk of heart disease. A serving of oatmeal supplies 0.75 grams of the 3.0 g of β-glucan soluble fiber necessary per day to have this effect." The claim language is in the Federal Register 21 CFR 101.81 Health Claims: "Soluble fiber from certain foods and risk of coronary heart disease (CHD)".

== Structure ==
Glucans are arranged in six-sided D-glucose rings connected linearly at different carbon positions depending on the compound, although most commonly β-glucans include a 1-3 glycosidic link in their backbone. They generally contain 20 - 30 D-glucose rings. Although technically β-glucans are chains of D-glucose polysaccharides linked by β-type glycosidic bonds, by convention not all β-D-glucose polysaccharides are categorized as β-glucans. Cellulose is not conventionally considered a β-glucan, as it is insoluble and does not exhibit the same physicochemical properties as other cereal or yeast β-glucans.

Glucose molecule, showing carbon numbering notation and β orientation.

Some β-glucan molecules have branching glucose side-chains attached to other positions on the main D-glucose chain, which branch off the β-glucan backbone. In addition, these side-chains can be attached to other types of molecules, like proteins, as in polysaccharide-K.

The most common forms of β-glucans are those comprising D-glucose units with β-1,3 links. Yeast and fungal β-glucans contain 1-6 side branches, while cereal β-glucans contain both β-1,3 and β-1,4 backbone bonds, but no β-1,3 branching. Seaweeds glucans consist of a backbone that is primarily β-1,3-glucan, but with some β-1,6-glucan in the backbone as well as in side chains.

Glucans have a significant role in carbon storage especially in marine algae and they are estimated to account for about 25% of world-wide organic carbon production. They are also cell wall components and can act in communication between fungi, plants and animals, notably in symbiotic or pathogenic interactions. The frequency, location, and length of the side-chains may play a role in immunomodulation. Differences in molecular weight, shape, and structure of β-glucans dictate the differences in biological activity.

In general, β-1,3 linkages are created by 1,3-beta-glucan synthase, and β-1,4 linkages are created by cellulose synthase. The process leading to β-1,6 linkages is poorly understood: although genes important in the process have been identified, not much is known about what each of them do.

β-Glucan Structure by Source
Source (Example)	Backbone	Branching	Solubility in Water
Bacteria (Curdlan)	β-1,3	None	Insoluble
Fungus	β-1,3	Short β-1,6 branching	Insoluble
Yeast	β-1,3	Long β-1,6 branching	Insoluble
Cereal (Mixed-linkage glucan)	β-1,3-1,4	None	Soluble

Bacteria make a variety of β-1,3 glycans. Linear β-1,3 glycans and derivatives with β-1,2 branches are commonly found in the bacterial capsule. Cyclic β-1,3-1,6 glycans are mostly found in the periplasm with an osmotic adaptation role. They are most commonly found in soil bacteria and pathogenic bacteria.

== β-glucan types used in the human diet ==
One of the most common sources of β-glucan for supplement use is derived from the cell wall of baker's yeast (Saccharomyces cerevisiae). β-glucans found in the cell walls of this yeast contain a β-1,3 glucose backbone with elongated β-1,6 glucose branches. Other sources include seaweed, and various mushrooms, such as lingzhi, shiitake, chaga, and maitake, which are under preliminary research for their potential immune effects.

=== Fermentable fiber ===
In the diet, β-glucans are a source of soluble, fermentable fiber – also called prebiotic fiber – which provides a substrate for microbiota within the large intestine, increasing fecal bulk and producing short-chain fatty acids as byproducts with wide-ranging physiological activities. This fermentation impacts the expression of many genes within the large intestine, which further affects digestive function and cholesterol and glucose metabolism, as well as the immune system and other systemic functions.

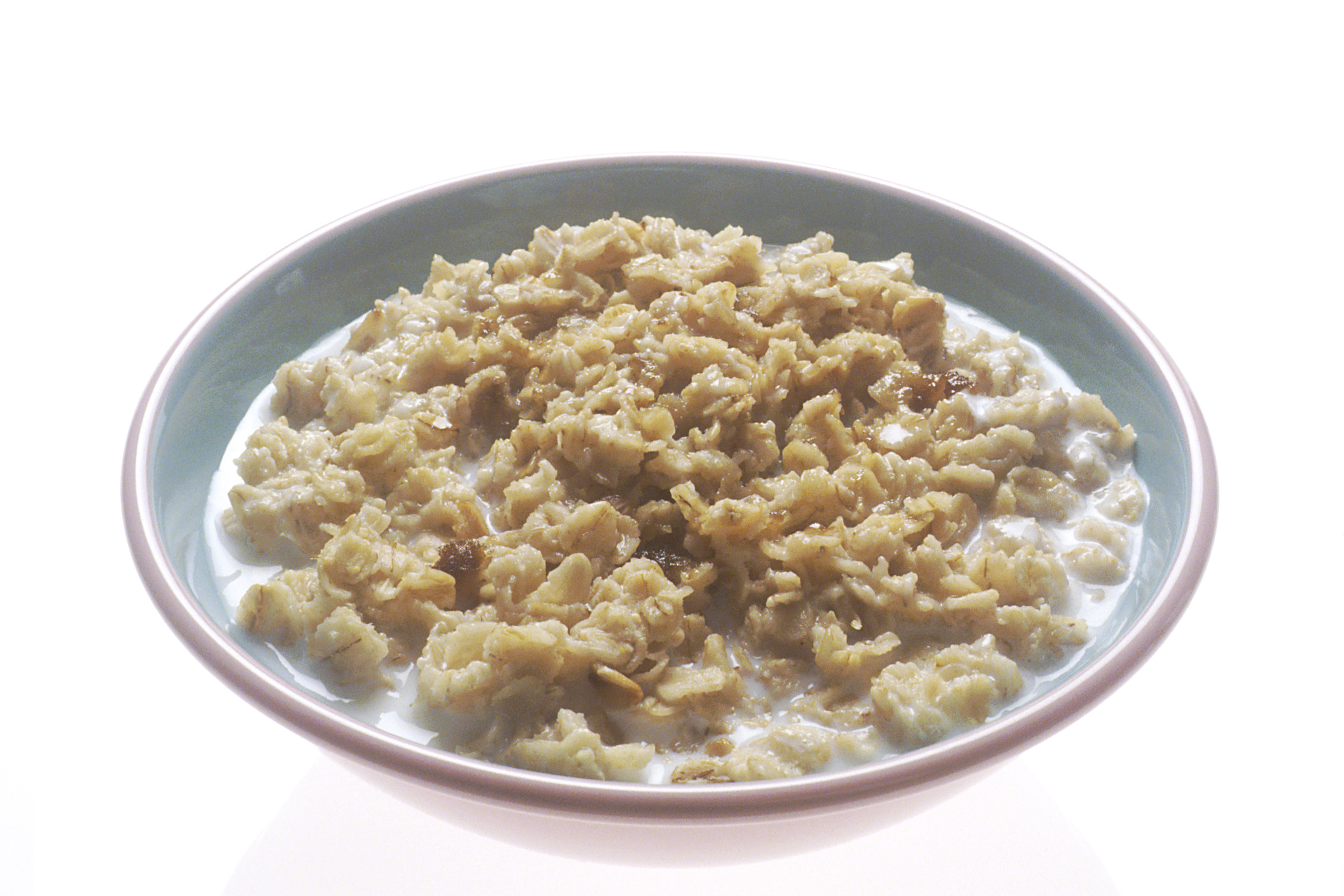
Oatmeal is a common food source of β-glucans

=== Cereal ===
Cereal β-glucans from oat, barley, wheat, and rye have been studied for their effects on cholesterol levels in people with normal cholesterol levels and in those with hypercholesterolemia. Intake of oat β-glucan at daily amounts of at least 3 grams lowers total and low-density lipoprotein cholesterol levels by 5 to 10% in people with normal or elevated blood cholesterol levels.

Oats and barley differ in the ratio of trimer and tetramer 1-4 linkages. Barley has more 1-4 linkages with a degree of polymerization higher than 4. However, the majority of barley blocks remain trimers and tetramers. In oats, β-glucan is found mainly in the endosperm of the oat kernel, especially in the outer layers of that endosperm.

== β-glucan absorption ==
Enterocytes facilitate the transportation of β(1,3)-glucans and similar compounds across the intestinal cell wall into the lymph, where they begin to interact with macrophages to activate immune function. Radiolabeled studies have verified that both small and large fragments of β-glucans are found in the serum, which indicates that they are absorbed from the intestinal tract. M cells within the Peyer's patches physically transport the insoluble whole glucan particles into the gut-associated lymphoid tissue.

== Presence in blood ==
An assay to detect the presence of (1,3)-β-D-glucan in blood is marketed as a means of identifying invasive or disseminated fungal infections. This test can aid in the detection of Aspergillus, Candida, and Pneumocystis jirovecii. This test cannot be used to detect Mucor or Rhizopus, the fungi responsible for mucormycosis, as they do not produce (1,3)-beta-D-glucan.

This test should be interpreted within the broader clinical context, however, as a positive test does not render a diagnosis, and a negative test does not rule out infection. False positives may occur because of fungal contaminants in various fungus-derived antibiotics such as the penicillin derivatives amoxicillin-clavulanate and piperacillin/tazobactam. False positives can also occur with presence (bacteremia or sample contamination) of the bacteria Streptococcus pneumoniae, Pseudomonas aeruginosa, and Agrobacterium, (Note: Source uses the name Alcaligenes faecalis due to a widespread misidentification of the curdlan-producing Agrobacterium originating in the 1960s. True Alcaligenes faecalis is classified in a different class from Agrobacterium.) which also produce (1→3)β-D-glucan.

== See also ==
- Prebiotic (nutrition)
- Resistant starch
- Xylooligosaccharides
- Zymosan
