= Aspergillus cleistominutus =

Scientific classification
- Kingdom: Fungi
- Division: Ascomycota
- Class: Eurotiomycetes
- Order: Eurotiales
- Family: Aspergillaceae
- Genus: Aspergillus
- Species: A. cleistominutus

Binomial name
- Aspergillus cleistominutus B.S. Mehrotra & R. Prasad

Synonyms
- Aspergillus rugulosus

Species of fungus

Aspergillus cleistominutus is a species of fungus in the genus Aspergillus. It is from the Nidulantes section. It has been reported to produce arugosin A, arugosin B, arugosin C, asperthecin, aspertetronin A, aspertetronin B, echinocandin B, echinocandin C, echinocandin D, epishamixanthone, shamixanthone, orsellinaldehyde, penicillin G, ruguloxanthone, and sterigmatocystin. It has been isolated from soil in New Jersey, United States.

== Growth and morphology ==
A. cleistominutus has been cultivated on both Czapek yeast extract agar (CYA) plates and Malt Extract Agar Oxoid® (MEAOX) plates. The growth morphology of the colonies can be seen in the pictures below.

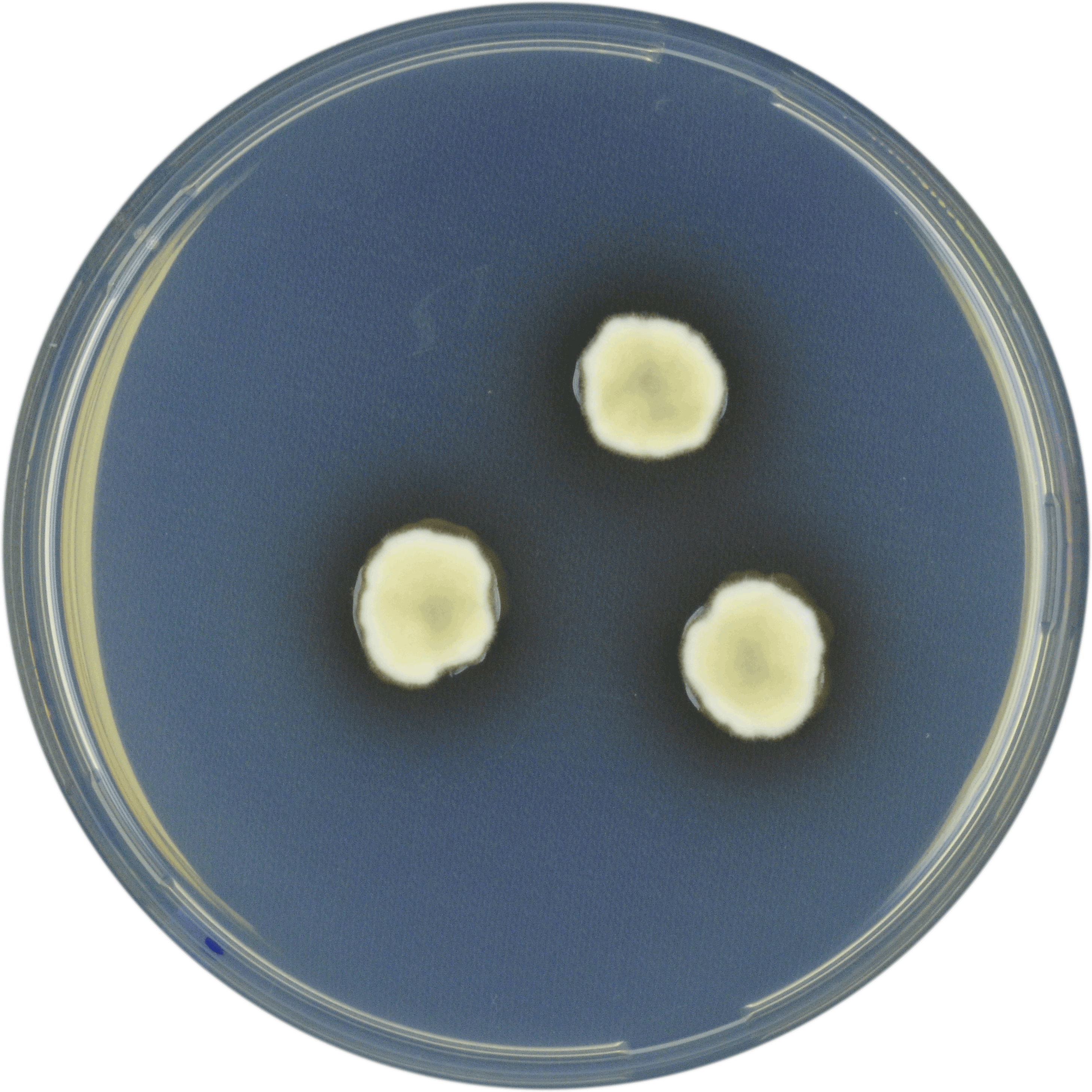
Aspergillus cleistominutus growing on CYA plate

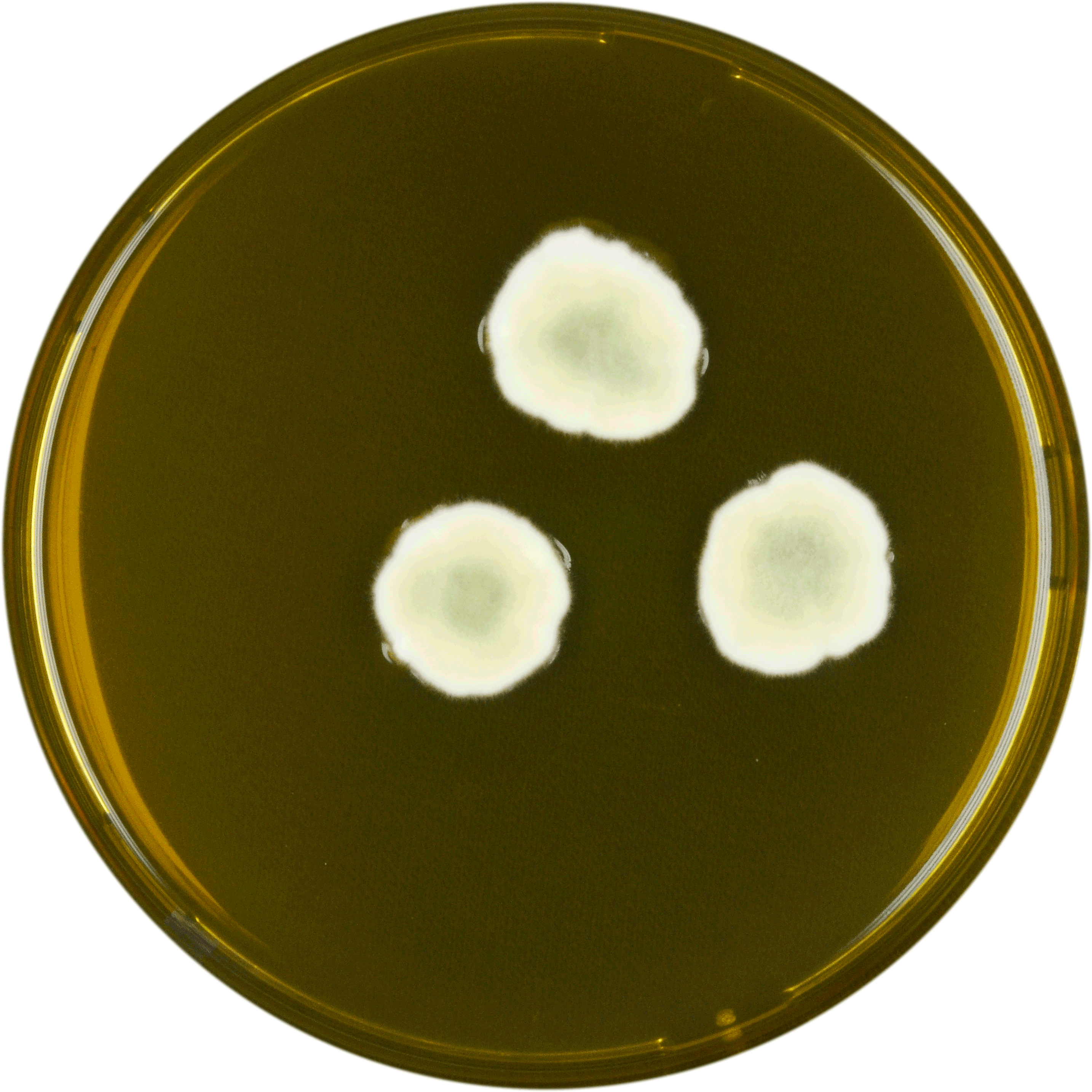
Aspergillus cleistominutus growing on MEAOX plate
