= Echinocandin =

Group of chemical compounds

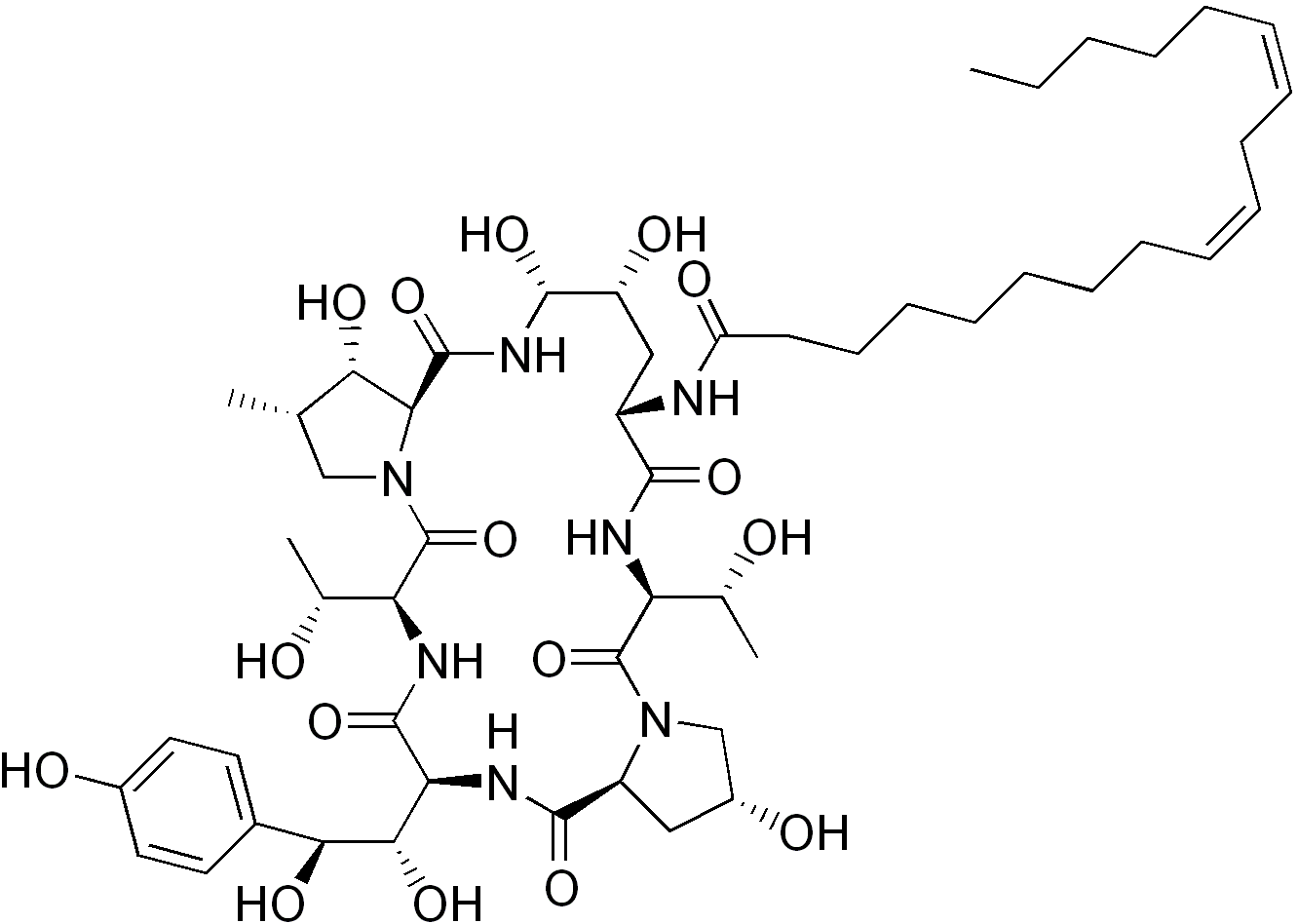
Echinocandin B

Echinocandins are a class of antifungal drugs that inhibit the synthesis of β-glucan in the fungal cell wall via noncompetitive inhibition of the enzyme 1,3-β glucan synthase. The class has been dubbed the "penicillin of antifungals," along with the related papulacandins, as their mechanism of action resembles that of penicillin in bacteria. β-glucans are carbohydrate polymers that are cross-linked with other fungal cell wall components, the fungal equivalent to bacterial peptidoglycan. Caspofungin, micafungin, and anidulafungin are semisynthetic echinocandin derivatives with limited clinical use due to their solubility, antifungal spectrum, and pharmacokinetic properties.

== Medical uses ==
Drugs and drug candidates in this class are fungicidal against some yeasts (most species of Candida, but not Cryptococcus, Trichosporon, and Rhodotorula). Echinocandins also have displayed activity against Candida biofilms, especially in synergistic activity with amphotericin B and additive activity with fluconazole. Echinocandins are fungistatic against some molds (Aspergillus, but not Fusarium and Rhizopus), and modestly or minimally active against dimorphic fungi (Blastomyces and Histoplasma). They have some activity against the spores of the fungus Pneumocystis jirovecii, formerly known as Pneumocystis carinii. Caspofungin is used in the treatment of febrile neutropenia and as "salvage" therapy for the treatment of invasive aspergillosis. Micafungin is used as prophylaxis against Candida infections in hematopoietic stem cell transplantation patients.

== Side effects ==
All three agents are well-tolerated, with the most common adverse effects being fever, rash, nausea, and phlebitis at the infusion site. They can also cause a histamine-like reaction (flushing) when infused too rapidly. Toxicity is uncommon. Its use has been associated with elevated aminotransferases and alkaline phosphatase levels.

== Chemistry ==
Caspofungin

The present-day clinically used echinocandins are semisynthetic pneumocandins, which are chemically lipopeptide in nature, consisting of large cyclic hexapeptoids. Caspofungin, micafungin, and anidulafungin are similar cyclic hexapeptide antibiotics linked to long modified N-linked acyl fatty acid chains. The chains serve as anchors on the fungal cell membrane to facilitate antifungal activity. Due to their limited oral bioavailability, echinocandins are administered through intravenous infusion.

== Mechanism of action ==
Echinocandins noncompetitively inhibit beta-1,3-D-glucan synthase enzyme complex in susceptible fungi to disturb fungal cell glucan synthesis. Beta-glucan destruction prevents resistance against osmotic forces, which leads to cell lysis. They have fungistatic activity against Aspergillus species and fungicidal activity against most Candida spp., including strains that are resistant to fluconazole. In vitro and mouse models show echinocandins may also enhance host immune responses by exposing highly antigenic beta-glucan epitopes that can accelerate host cellular recognition and inflammatory responses.

== Resistance ==
Echinocandin resistance is rare among Candida spp. However, case studies have shown some resistance in C. albicans, C. glabrata, C. lusitaniae, C. tropicalis, and C. parapsilosis. Resistance patterns include alterations in the glucan synthase (Fks1-Fks2 complex), overexpression of efflux pumps, strengthening of cell wall by increased chitin production, upregulation of stress-response pathways, and dysregulation of mismatch repair pathways. In addition a few species and strains of Candida spp. and Aspergillus spp. show a "paradoxic effect", i.e., they are susceptible to low concentrations but resistant to high concentrations in broth microdilution studies.

Several non-candidal yeasts, e.g., Cryptococcus, Trichosporon, Rhodotorula and Blastoschizomyces and filamentous fungi like Fusarium, zygomycetes and Scedosporium are often resistant to echinocandins. Echinocandins have weak in vitro activity (a high minimum inhibitory concentration) and very little clinical efficacy against Histoplasma, Blastomyces, and Coccidioides, especially their yeast forms.

== Pharmacokinetics ==
Due to the large molecular weight of echinocandins, they have poor oral bioavailability and are administered by intravenous infusion. In addition, their large structures limit penetration into cerebrospinal fluid, urine, and eyes. In plasma, echinocandins have a high affinity to serum proteins. Echinocandins do not have primary interactions with CYP450 or P-glycoprotein pumps. Caspofungin has triphasic nonlinear pharmacokinetics, while micafungin (hepatically metabolized by arylsulfatase, catechol O-methyltransferase, and hydroxylation) and anidulafungin (degraded spontaneously in the system and excreted mostly as a metabolite in the urine) have linear elimination. Younger patients exhibit a faster rate of elimination of micafungin and caspofungin.

== Interference ==
Caspofungin has some interference with ciclosporin metabolism, and micafungin has some interference with sirolimus (rapamycin), but anidulafungin needs no dose adjustments when given with ciclosporin, tacrolimus, or voriconazole.

== Advantages ==
Advantages of echinocandins:

- Broad range (especially against all Candida), thus can be given empirically in febrile neutropenia and stem cell transplant
- Can be used in case of azole-resistant Candida or use as a second-line agent for refractory aspergillosis
- Long half-life (polyphasic elimination: alpha phase 1–2 hours + beta phase 9–11 hours + gamma phase 40–50 hours)
- Low toxicity: only histamine release (3%), fever (2.9%), nausea and vomiting (2.9%), and phlebitis at the injection site (2.9%), very rarely allergy and anaphylaxis
- Not an inhibitor, inducer, or substrate of the cytochrome P450 system, or P-glycoprotein, thus minimal drug interactions
- Lack of interference from kidney failure and hemodialysis
- No dose adjustment is necessary based on age, gender, race
- Better (or no less effective) than amphotericin B and fluconazole against yeast (mainly Candida, NOT yeast form of dimorphic) infections

== Disadvantages ==
Disadvantages of echinocandins:

- Cryptococcus, Trichosporon, and zygomycetes are often resistant to echinocandins and they show weak activity against yeast forms of Histoplasma, Blastomyces, and Coccidioides.
- Embryotoxic in animal studies (category C) thus should be avoided if possible in pregnancy
- Some need adjustment of dosing for patients with liver disease.
- Poor ocular penetration in fungal endophthalmitis

== Examples ==
List of echinocandins:

- Pneumocandins (cyclic hexapeptides linked to a long-chain fatty acid)
- Echinocandin B not clinically used, risk of hemolysis
- Cilofungin withdrawn from trials due to solvent toxicity
- Caspofungin (trade name Cancidas, by Merck)
- Micafungin (FK463) (trade name Mycamine, by Astellas Pharma.)
- Anidulafungin (VER-002, V-echinocandin, LY303366) (trade name Eraxis, by Pfizer)
- Rezafungin formerly CD101 IV, Rezafungin is considered to be safest echinocandins which also acts longest (weekly single dose). It is developed by Cidara Therapeutics. The STRIVE Trial (phase 2) showed weekly treatment with Rezafungin was safe and efficacious in the treatment of candidemia and/or invasive candidiasis.

== History ==
Anidulafungin

Discovery of echinocandins stemmed from studies on papulacandins isolated from a strain of Papularia sphaerosperma (Pers.), which were liposaccharide - i.e., fatty acid derivatives of a disaccharide that also blocked the same target, 1,3-β glucan synthase - and had action only on Candida spp. (narrow spectrum). Screening of natural products of fungal fermentation in the 1970s led to the discovery of echinocandins, a new group of antifungals with broad-range activity against Candida spp. One of the first echinocandins of the pneumocandin type, discovered in 1974, echinocandin B, could not be used clinically due to risk of high degree of hemolysis. Screening semisynthetic analogs of the echinocandins gave rise to cilofungin, the first echinofungin analog to enter clinical trials, in 1980, which, it is presumed, was later withdrawn for a toxicity due to the solvent system needed for systemic administration. The semisynthetic pneumocandin analogs of echinocandins were later found to have the same kind of antifungal activity, but low toxicity. The first of these newer echinocandins to be approved by the U.S. Food and Drug Administration was caspofungin, and later micafungin and anidulafungin were also approved. All these preparations have very low oral bioavailability, so they must be given intravenously to be useful. Echinocandins have become one of the first-line treatments for Candida before the species are identified, and even as antifungal prophylaxis in hematopoietic stem cell transplant patients.

== See also ==
- Papulacandin B
