= Meiocyte =

Cell that differentiates into a gamete

A meiocyte is a type of cell that differentiates into a gamete through the process of meiosis. Through meiosis, the diploid meiocyte divides into four genetically different haploid gametes. The control of the meiocyte through the meiotic cell cycle varies between different groups of organisms.

== Yeast ==
The process of meiosis has been extensively studied in model organisms, such as yeast. Because of this, the way in which the meiocyte is controlled through the meiotic cell cycle is best understood in this group of organisms. A yeast meiocyte that is undergoing meiosis must pass through a number of checkpoints in order to complete the cell cycle. If a meiocyte divides and this division results in a mutant cell, the mutant cell will undergo apoptosis and, therefore, will not complete the cycle.

In natural populations of the yeast Saccharomyces cerevisiae, diploid meiocytes produce haploid cells that then mainly undergo either clonal reproduction, or selfing (intratetrad mating) to form progeny diploid meiocytes. When the ancestry of natural S. cerevisiae strains was analyzed, it was determined that formation of diploid meiocytes by outcrossing (as opposed to inbreeding or selfing) occurs only about once every 50,000 cell divisions. These findings suggest that the principal adaptive function of meiocytes may not be related to the production of genetic diversity that occurs infrequently by outcrossing, but rather may be mainly related to recombinational repair of DNA damage (that can occur in meiocytes at each mating cycle).

== Animal ==
The animal meiotic cell cycle is very much like that of yeast. Checkpoints within the animal meiotic cell cycle serve to stop mutant meiocytes from progressing further within the cycle. Like yeast meiocytes, if an animal meiocyte differentiates into a mutant cell, the cell will undergo apoptosis.

== Plant ==
The meiotic cell cycle in plants is very different from that of yeast and animal cells. In plant studies, mutations have been identified that affect meiocyte formation or the process of meiosis. Most meiotic mutant plant cells complete the meiotic cell cycle and produce abnormal microspores. It appears that plant meiocytes do not undergo any checkpoints within the meiotic cell cycle and can, thus, proceed through the cycle regardless of any defect. By studying the abnormal microspores, the progression of the plant meiocyte through the meiotic cell cycle can be investigated further.

== Mammalian infertility ==
Researching meiosis in mammals plays a crucial role in understanding human infertility. Meiosis research within mammal populations is restricted due to the fundamental nature of meiosis. In order to study mammalian meiosis, a culture technique that would allow for this process to be observed live under a microscope would need to be identified. By viewing live mammalian meiosis, one can observe the behavior of mutant meiocytes that may possibly compromise infertility within the particular organism. However, because of the size and small number of meiocytes, collecting samples of these cells has been difficult and is currently being researched.
