= Orsellinic acid =

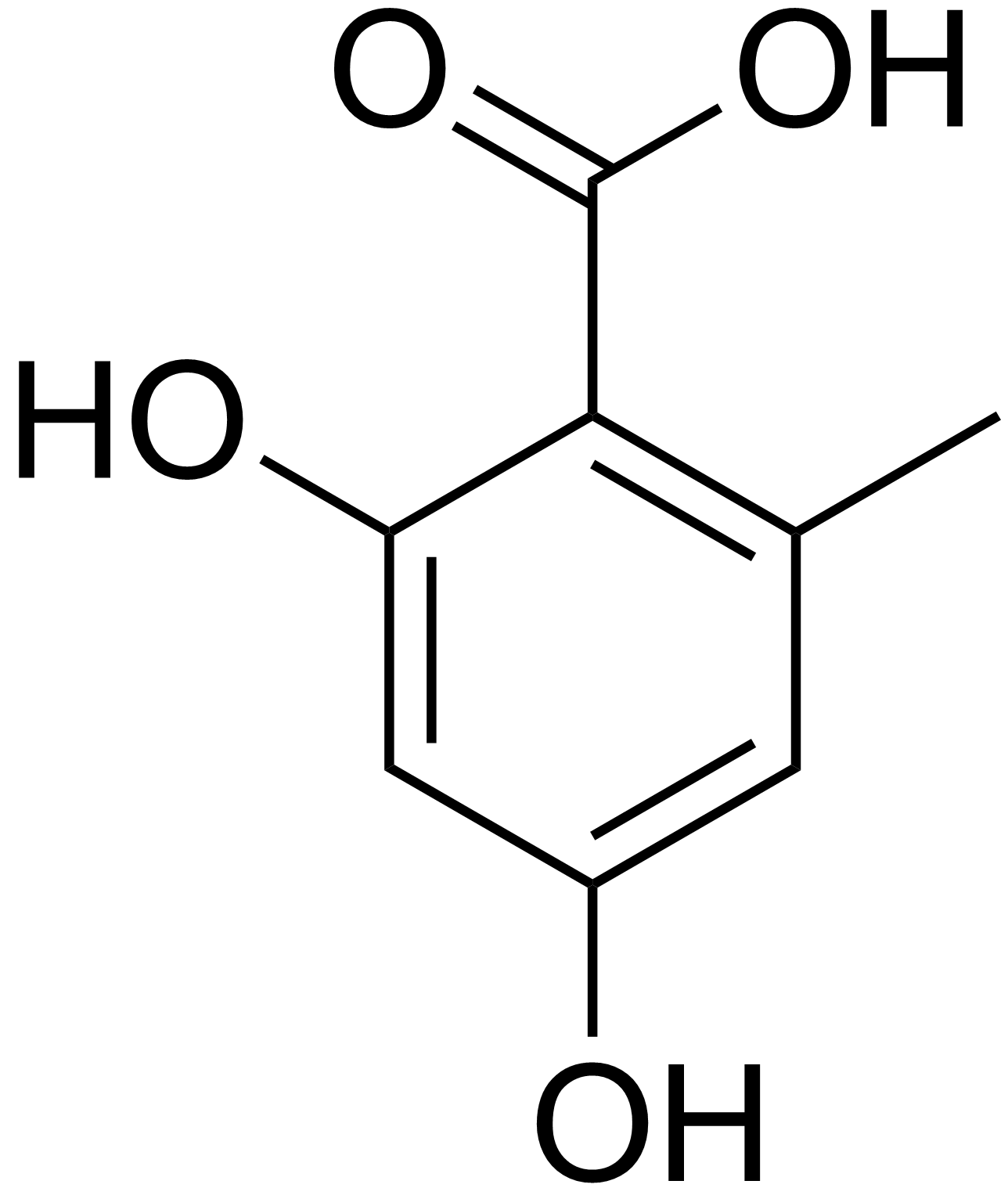

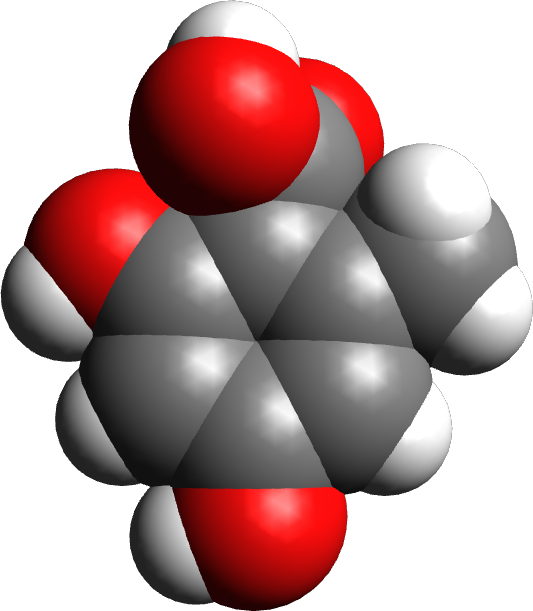

Names
- Preferred IUPAC name 2,4-Dihydroxy-6-methylbenzoic acid

Identifiers
CAS Number	480-64-8
3D model (JSmol)	Interactive image
ChEBI	CHEBI:32807
ChEMBL	ChEMBL457583
ChemSpider	61385
ECHA InfoCard	100.115.964
EC Number	610-404-4
KEGG	C01839
PubChem CID	68072
UNII	11XLA0494B
CompTox Dashboard (EPA)	DTXSID20197385
- InChI: InChI=1S/C8H8O4/c1-4-2-5(9)3-6(10)7(4)8(11)12/h2-3,9-10H,1H3,(H,11,12) Key: AMKYESDOVDKZKV-UHFFFAOYSA-N; InChI=1/C8H8O4/c1-4-2-5(9)3-6(10)7(4)8(11)12/h2-3,9-10H,1H3,(H,11,12) Key: AMKYESDOVDKZKV-UHFFFAOYAS
- SMILES: O=C(O)c1c(cc(O)cc1O)C

Properties
Chemical formula	C_{8}H_{8}O_{4}
Molar mass	168.148 g·mol^{−1}
Melting point	176 °C (349 °F; 449 K)
- Except where otherwise noted, data are given for materials in their standard state (at 25 °C [77 °F], 100 kPa). verify (what is ?) Infobox references

Orsellinic acid, more specifically o-orsellinic acid, is a phenolic acid. It is of importance in the biochemistry of lichens, from which it can be extracted. It is a common subunit of depsides.

== Chemistry ==
It can be prepared by the oxidation of Orsellinaldehyde, or through a Michael adduct:

This can also be produced by the hydrolysis of either everninic acid or ramalic acid by boiling with barium hydroxide. When crystallized from acetone it forms crystalline needles with a melting point of 176 °C. It also forms a crystalline hydrate with a melting point of 186-189 °C when crystallized from water.

Orsellinic acid is biosynthesized by a polyketide pathway.

Biosynthesis of orsellinic acid from polyketides
