= Cellulose synthase (UDP-forming) =

Cellulose-synthesizing enzyme

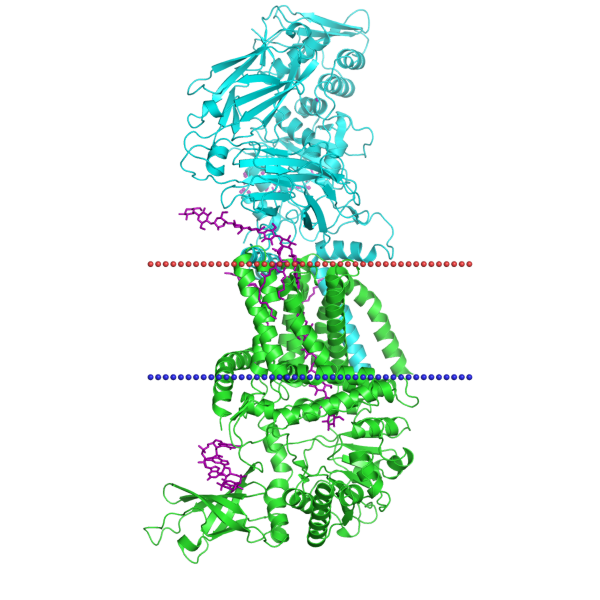
- Structure of the bacterial cellulose synthase. Green: catalytic subunit BcsA; Cyan: regulatory subunit BcsB. Up: periplasm; Down: cytoplasm. PDB: 4p02, via OPM.

Identifiers
- EC no.: 2.4.1.12
- CAS no.: 9027-19-4
- Alt. names: GS-I

Databases
- BRENDA: enzyme data
- ExPASy: NiceZyme view
- KEGG: enzyme entry
- MetaCyc: metabolic pathway
- Rhea: reactions
- PDB structures: RCSB PDB PDBe PDBsum
Search
- PMC: articles
- PubMed: articles
- NCBI: proteins

Cellulose synthase (CesA/BcsA)

Identifiers
- Symbol: Cellulose_synth
- Pfam: PF03552
- InterPro: IPR005150
- TCDB: 4.D.3
- CAZy: GT2
Available protein structures:
- PDB: IPR005150 PF03552 (ECOD; PDBsum)
- AlphaFold: IPR005150; PF03552
- 4p02 chain A; CAZy and TCDB also includes other proteins

Bacterial cellulose synthase di-GMP-binding regulatory subunit

Identifiers
- Symbol: BcsB
- Pfam: PF03170
- InterPro: IPR018513
- CATH: 4p02
- OPM superfamily: 302
- OPM protein: 4p02
- Membranome: 539
Available protein structures:
- PDB: IPR018513 PF03170 (ECOD; PDBsum)
- AlphaFold: IPR018513; PF03170

The UDP-forming form of cellulose synthase (EC 2.4.1.12) is the main enzyme that produces cellulose. Systematically, it is known as UDP-glucose:(1→4)-β-D-glucan 4-β-D-glucosyltransferase in enzymology. It catalyzes the chemical reaction:

UDP-glucose + [(1→4)-β-D-glucosyl]_{n} = UDP + [(1→4)-β-D-glucosyl]_{n+1}

A similar enzyme utilizes GDP-glucose, cellulose synthase (GDP-forming) (EC 2.4.1.29).

This family of enzymes is found in bacteria and plants alike. Plant members are usually known as CesA (cellulose synthase) or the tentative CslA (cellulose synthase-like), while bacterial members may additionally be known as BcsA (bacterial cellulose synthase) or CelA (simply "cellulose"). Plants acquired CesA from the endosymbiosis event that produced the chloroplast. This family belongs to glucosyltransferase family 2 (GT2). Glycosyltransferases are involved in the biosynthesis and hydrolysis of the bulk of earth's biomass. There are known to be about seven subfamilies in the plant CesA superfamily, or ten in the combined plant-algal superfamily. Urochordates are the only group of animals possessing this enzyme, having acquired them by horizontal gene transfer more than 530 million years ago.

== Cellulose ==
Cellulose is an aggregation of unbranched polymer chains made of β-(1→4)-linked glucose residues that makes up a large portion of primary and secondary cell walls. Although important for plants, it is also synthesized by most algae, some bacteria, and some animals. Worldwide, 2 × 10^{11} tons of cellulose microfibrils are produced, which serves as a critical source of renewable biofuels and other biological-based products, such as lumber, fuel, fodder, paper and cotton.

=== Purpose of cellulose ===
Cellulose microfibrils are made on the surface of cell membranes to reinforce cells walls, which has been researched extensively by plant biochemists and cell biologist because 1) they regulate cellular morphogenesis and 2) they serve alongside many other constituents (i.e. lignin, hemicellulose, pectin) in the cell wall as a strong structural support and cell shape. Without these support structures, cell growth would cause a cell to swell and spread in all directions, thus losing its shape viability

== Structure ==
Several structures of the bacterial cellulose synthase BcsAB have been resolved. The bacterial enzyme consists of two different subunits, the catalytic BcsA on the cytoplasmic side, and the regulatory BcsB on the periplasmic side. They are coupled by a series of transmembrane helices, termed by the CATH database as 4p02A01 and 4p02B05. (Divisions for other models, such as 4hg6, follow similarly.) The enzyme is stimulated by cyclic di-GMP. In vivo but not in vitro, a third subunit called BcsC made up of a 18-strand beta barrel is required. Some bacteria contain extra non-essential periplasmic subunits.

BcsA follows a layout of cytoplasmic domains sandwiched between the N- and C-terminal transmembrane domain. It has a typical family 2 GT domain (4p02A02) with a GT-A fold structure. At the C-terminal end is a PilZ domain conserved in bacteria, which forms part of the cyclic di-GMP binding surface together with BcsB and the beta-barrel (4p02A03) domain. Besides the C-terminal TM domain, BcsB is made up of two repeats, each consisting of a carbohydrate-binding module 27 (CATH 2.60.120.260) and an alpha-beta sandwith (CATH 3.30.379.20).

BcsA and BcsB together form a channel through which the synthesized cellulose exits the cell, and mutations to residues lining the channel are known to reduce the activity of this enzyme. A gating loop in BcsA closes over the channel; it opens when cyclic di-GMP is bound to the enzyme.

=== Plants ===
In plants, cellulose is synthesized by large cellulose synthase complexes (CSCs), which consist of synthase protein isoforms (CesA) that are arranged into a unique hexagonal structure known as a "particle rosette" 50 nm wide and 30–35 nm tall. There are more than 20 of these full-length integral membrane proteins, each of which is around 1000 amino acids long. These rosettes, formerly known as granules, were first discovered in 1972 by electron microscopy in green algae species Cladophora and Chaetomorpha (Robinson et al. 1972). Solution x-ray scattering have shown that CesAs are at the surface of a plant cell and are elongated monomers with a two catalytic domains that fuse together into dimers. The center of the dimers is the main point of catalytic activity, and the lobes are presumed to contain the plant specific PC-R and CS-R. Since cellulose is made in all cell walls, CesA proteins are present in all tissues and cell types of plants. Nonetheless, there are different types of CesA, some tissue types may have varying concentrations of one over another. For example, the AtCesA1 (RSW1) protein is involved in the biosynthesis of primary cell walls throughout the whole plant while the AtCesA7 (IRX3) protein is only expressed in the stem for secondary cell wall production.

Compared to the bacterial enzyme, plant versions of the synthase are much harder to crystallize, and as of August 2019 no experimental atomic structures of the plant cellulose synthase catalytic domain is known. However, at least two high-confidence structures have been predicted for these enzymes. The broader of the two structures (Sethaphong 2013), which includes the entire middle cytoplasmic domain (again sandwiched between TM helices), gives a useful view of the enzyme: two plant-specific insertions called the PC-R (plant-conserved region, similar in all plants) on the N-terminal end and CS-R (class-specific region, determines the subclass number after CesA) on the C-terminal end punctuate the usual GT catalytic core, probably providing the unique rosette-forming function of plant CesA. (Some CesA proteins possess an additional insertion.) The structure seems to explain the effects of many known mutations. The positioning of the two insertions, however, do not match the scattering result from Olek 2014. A 2016 experimental model of the PC-R (5JNP) domain helps to fill in this gap, as it greatly improves the fit against Olek's previous result. It also matches the Sethaphong 2015 prediction of an antiparallel coiled-coil well. The two groups continue to further their understandings of the CesA structure, with Olek et al. focusing on experimental structures and Sethaphong et al. focusing on plant studies and building better computer models.

Other differences from the bacterial BcsA includes a different TM helice count (BcsA has 4 helices on each end; CesA has two on the N-terminal and 6 on the C-terminal), and the presence of a zinc finger (1WEO) at the N-terminus.

== Activity ==
Cellulose biosynthesis is the process during which separate homogeneous β-(1→4)-glucan chains, ranging from 2,000 to 25,000 glucose residues in length, are synthesized and then immediately hydrogen bond with one another to form rigid crystalline arrays, or microfibrils. Microfibrils in the primary cell wall are approximately 36 chains long while those of the secondary cell wall are much larger, containing up to 1200 β-(1→4)-glucan chains. Uridine diphosphate-glucose (UDP), which is produced by the enzyme sucrose synthase (SuSy) that produces and transports UDP-glucose to the plasma membrane is the substrate used by cellulose synthase to produce the glucan chains. The rate at which glucose residues are synthesized per one glucan chain ranges from 300 to 1000 glucose residues per minute, the higher rate being more prevalent in secondary wall particles, such as in the xylem.

=== Supporting structures ===
Microfibril synthesis is guided by cortical microtubules, which lie beneath the plasma membrane of elongating cells, in that they form a platform on which the CSCs can convert glucose molecules into the crystalline chains. The microtubule–microfibril alignment hypothesis proposes that cortical microtubules, which lie beneath the plasma membrane of elongating cells, provide tracks for CSCs that convert glucose molecules into crystalline cellulose microfibrils. The direct hypothesis postulates some types of direct linkage between CESA complexes and microtubules. Additionally, the KORRIGAN (KOR1) protein is thought to be a critical component of cellulose synthesis in that it acts as a cellulase at the plasma membrane-cell wall interface. KOR1 interacts with a two specific CesA proteins, possibly by proof-reading and relieving stress created by glucan chain synthesis, by hydrolyzing disordered amorphous cellulose.

=== Environmental influences ===
Cellulose synthesis activity is affected by many environmental stimuli, such as hormones, light, mechanical stimuli, nutrition, and interactions with the cytoskeleton. Interactions with these factors may influence cellulose deposition in that it affects the amount of substrate produced and the concentration and/or activity of CSCs in the plasma membrane.
