= Cellulose synthase (GDP-forming) =

Class of enzymes

cellulose synthase (GDP-forming)

Identifiers
- EC no.: 2.4.1.29
- CAS no.: 9027-18-3

Databases
- IntEnz: IntEnz view
- BRENDA: BRENDA entry
- ExPASy: NiceZyme view
- KEGG: KEGG entry
- MetaCyc: metabolic pathway
- PRIAM: profile
- PDB structures: RCSB PDB PDBe PDBsum
- Gene Ontology: AmiGO / QuickGO
Search
- PMC: articles
- PubMed: articles
- NCBI: proteins

In enzymology, a cellulose synthase (GDP-forming) (EC 2.4.1.29) is an enzyme that catalyzes the chemical reaction

GDP-glucose + (1,4-beta-D-glucosyl)n $\rightleftharpoons$ GDP + (1,4-beta-D-glucosyl)n^{+}1

Thus, the two substrates of this enzyme are GDP-glucose and (1,4-beta-D-glucosyl)n, whereas its two products are GDP and (1,4-beta-D-glucosyl)n+1.

This enzyme belongs to the family of glycosyltransferases, specifically the hexosyltransferases. The systematic name of this enzyme class is GDP-glucose:1,4-beta-D-glucan 4-beta-D-glucosyltransferase. Other names in common use include cellulose synthase (guanosine diphosphate-forming), cellulose synthetase, guanosine diphosphoglucose-1,4-beta-glucan glucosyltransferase, and guanosine diphosphoglucose-cellulose glucosyltransferase. This enzyme participates in starch and sucrose metabolism.

As of August 2019, no proteins with this activity are known in the UniProt/NiceZYme or the gene ontology database.
