= Arugosin C =

Names
- IUPAC name 7,11-Dihydroxy-17-(2-hydroxypropan-2-yl)-13-methyl-6-(3-methylbut-2-enyl)-2,15-dioxatetracyclo[8.7.1.0^{3,8}.0^{14,18}]octadeca-3(8),4,6,10,12,14(18)-hexaen-9-one

Identifiers
CAS Number	50875-10-0
3D model (JSmol)	Interactive image
ChEBI	CHEBI:68860
ChEMBL	ChEMBL3092848
ChemSpider	166008
PubChem CID	191158
UNII	FD39J64RWK
CompTox Dashboard (EPA)	DTXSID10965111
- InChI: InChI=1S/C25H28O6/c1-12(2)6-7-14-8-9-17-19(21(14)27)22(28)18-16(26)10-13(3)23-20(18)24(31-17)15(11-30-23)25(4,5)29/h6,8-10,15,24,26-27,29H,7,11H2,1-5H3 Key: MYJGUMZTENHAAQ-UHFFFAOYSA-N
- SMILES: CC1=CC(=C2C3=C1OCC(C3OC4=C(C2=O)C(=C(C=C4)CC=C(C)C)O)C(C)(C)O)O

Properties
Chemical formula	C_{25}H_{28}O_{6}
Molar mass	424.493 g·mol^{−1}
- Except where otherwise noted, data are given for materials in their standard state (at 25 °C [77 °F], 100 kPa). Infobox references

Arugosin C is an anthraquinone derivative isolated from a species of Aspergillus found in the Red Sea.
