= List of sequenced fungi genomes =

This list of sequenced fungi genomes contains all the fungal species known to have publicly available complete genome sequences that have been assembled, annotated and published; draft genomes are not included, nor are organelle only sequences. For all kingdoms, see lists of sequenced genomes.

== Ascomycota ==
=== Dothideomycetes ===
- Aureobasidium pullulans, A. melanogenum, A. subglaciale and A. namibiae, polyextremotolerant (2014)
- Hortaea werneckii, extremely halotolerant (2013 2017)
- Leptosphaeria maculans, plant pathogen (2011)
- Macrophomina phaseolina, plant pathogen (2012)
- Mycosphaerella fijiensis, plant pathogen (2007)
- Mycosphaerella graminicola IPO323, wheat pathogen (2008)
- Phaeosphaeria nodorum SN15, wheat pathogen (2005)
- Pyrenophora tritici-repentis Pt-1C-BFP, wheat pathogen (2007)

=== Eurotiomycetes ===
- Ajellomyces capsulata several strains, Darling's disease (2009, unpubl.)
- Ajellomyces dermatitidis several strains (2009, unpubl.)
- Arthroderma benhamiae CBS 112371, skin infection (2010, unpubl.)
- Arthroderma gypseum CBS 118893, athlete's foot (2008)
- Arthroderma otae CBS 113480, athlete's foot (2008)
- Aspergillus aculeatus ATCC16872, industrial use (2010)
- Aspergillus carbonarius ITEM 5010, food pathogen (2009)
- Aspergillus clavatus Strain:NRRL1 (2008)
- Aspergillus fumigatus Strain:A1163, human pathogen (2008)
- Aspergillus fumigatus Strain:Af293, human pathogen (2005)
- Aspergillus kawachii IFO 4308, food industry (2011)
- Aspergillus nidulans Strain:FGSC A4, model organism (2005)
- Aspergillus niger Strain:ATCC 1015 (DOE Joint Genome institute)
- Aspergillus niger Strain:CBS 513.88, industrial use (2007)
- Aspergillus oryzae Strain:RIB40, industrial use (2005)
- Aspergillus terreus NIH 2624, statin producer and pathogen (2005, unpubl.)
- Coccidioides immitis, human pathogen, Valley fever (2009)
- Coccidioides posadasii C735 delta SOWgp, human pathogen, Valley fever (2009)
- Neosartorya fischeri Strain:NRRL181 (2008)
- Paracoccidioides brasiliensis, several strains, human pathogen (2007
- Penicillium chrysogenum Strain: Wisconsin54-1255, industrial use (2008)
- Penicillium digitatum Strain PHI26 (2012)
- Penicillium digitatum Strain Pd1 (2012
- Talaromyces marneffei, human pathogen (2011
- Uncinocarpus reesii (2009)

=== Leotiomycetes ===
- Blumeria graminis ffsp hordei Strain:DH14, plant pathogen (2010)
- Botrytis cinerea (Botryotinia fuckeliana) Strain:B05.10 and T4, plant pathogen (2011)
- Glarea lozoyensis (2012)
- Sclerotinia sclerotiorum Strain:1980 (2011)
- Ascocoryne sarcoides Strain: NRRL50072 (2012)
- Podosphaera macularis Strain: HPM-609, plant pathogen (2023)

=== Pezizomycetes ===
- Cladobotryum protrusum (2019)
- Tuber melanosporum Mel28, Périgord black truffle (2010)

=== Saccharomycetes ===
- Ashbya gossypii Strain:ATCC 10895, plant pathogen (2004)
- Candida albicans Strain:SC5314, human pathogen (2004)
- Candida albicans Strain:WO-1, human pathogen (2009)
- Candida dubliniensis CD36, human pathogen (2009)
- Candida glabrata Strain:CBS138, human pathogen (2004)
- Candida guilliermondii, human pathogen (2009)
- Candida lusitaniae, human pathogen (2009)
- Candida parapsilosis, human pathogen (2009)
- Candida orthopsilosis, human pathogen (2012)
- Candida tropicalis, human pathogen (2009)
- Debaryomyces hansenii Strain:CBS767, industrial use (2004)
- Debaryomyces hansenii Strain:MTCC 234, salt-tolerant (2012)
- Dekkera bruxellensis Strain:CBS2499, wine yeast (2012)
- Hansenula polymorpha NCYC 495 leu1.1, industrial use (2010)
- Kluyveromyces aestuarii ATCC 18862 (2010, unpubl.)
- Kluyveromyces lactis Strain:CLIB210, industrial use (2004)
- Kluyveromyces wickerhamii UCD 54-210 (2010, unpubl.)
- Lachancea kluyveri (Saccharomyces kluyveri) NRRL Y-12651, plant pathogen (2009)
- Lodderomyces elongisporus, human pathogen (2009)
- Naumovozyma castellii Strain:AS 2.2404, CBS 4309 (Saccharomyces castellii; 2003, 2011)
- Naumovozyma dairenensis Strain:CBS 421 (2011)
- Saccharomyces bayanus (2003, 2011)
- Saccharomyces arboricolus (2013,)
- Saccharomyces cerevisiae Strain:JAY291, industrial/model (2009)
- Saccharomyces cerevisiae Strain:S288C, industrial/model (1996)
- Saccharomyces cerevisiae Strain:Sigma1278b, industrial/model (2010)
- Saccharomyces kudriavzevii (2003)
- Saccharomyces mikatae (2003, 2011)
- Saccharomyces paradoxus (2003 2009)
- Saccharomyces pastorianus Weihenstephan 34/70, industrial, beer (2009)
- Scheffersomyces stipitis (Pichia stipitis) CBS 6054, lignin/xylose degrader (2007)
- Spathaspora passalidarum NRRL Y-27907, model xylose fermenter (2010)
- Tetrapisispora phaffii van der Walt Y 89, CBS 4417 (2011)
- Torulaspora delbrueckii Strain:Wallerstein 129, CBS 1146 (2011)
- Vanderwaltozyma polyspora DSM 70294 (2007)
- Yarrowia lipolytica Strain:CLIB99, industrial use (2004)
- Zygosaccharomyces rouxii strain CBS732, food spoiler (2009)

=== Schizosaccharomycetes ===
- Schizosaccharomyces japonicus yFS275, model for invasive growth (2006)
- Schizosaccharomyces pombe Strain:972h, model eukaryote (2002)

=== Sordariomycetes ===
- Colletotrichum graminicola, corn pathogen (2012)
- Colletotrichum higginsianum, Arabidopsis thaliana pathogen (2012)
- Chaetomium cochliodes Strain:CCM F-232, soil fungus (2016)
- Chaetomium globosum Strain:CBS 148.51, soil fungus (2005)
- Chaetomium thermophilum Strain:CBS 144.50, soil fungus (2011)
- Fusarium oxysporum f. sp. lycopersici 4287, human/plant pathogen (2010)
- Gibberella moniliformis 7600, plant pathogen (2010)
- Gibberella zeae PH-1, plant pathogen (2008)
- Gaeumannomyces graminis tritici R3-111a-1 (2010, unpubl.)
- Grosmannia clavigera kw1407, plant pathogen (2011)
- Magnaporthe grisea, plant pathogen (20054)
- Metarhizium acridum CQMa 102, and
- Metarhizium anisopliae ARSEF 23, insect pathogens (2011)
- Neurospora crassa, model eukaryote (2003)
- Neurospora tetrasperma FGSC 2508 mat A, model (2010)
- Nectria haematococca MPVI, plastic/pest./lignin degrader (2009)
- Podospora anserina :S mat+
- Sporotrichum thermophile, thermophilic cellulose degrader (2010)
- Thielavia terrestris, model thermophile/industrial (2010)
- Trichoderma atroviride, industrial/soil, (2010)
- Trichoderma reesei QM6a, biomass-degrading (2008)
- Trichoderma virens Gv29-8, industrial/pathogen (2007)
- Verticillium albo-atrum VaMs.102, plant pathogen (2008, unpubl.)

== Basidiomycota ==
=== Agaricomycetes ===
- Agaricus bisporus var. bisporus Strain:H97, Champignon (2009)
- Agrocybe aegerita, ack Poplar or Sword-belt Mushroom (2018) )
- Auricularia delicata (2012)
- Auricularia heimuer, Chinese Auricularia (2019)
- Coniophora puteana (2012)
- Coprinopsis cinerea (Coprinus cinereus), model organism for multicellular fungi (2010)
- Dichomitus squalens (2012)
- Fibroporia radiculosa Strain:TFFH 294 (2012)
- Fomitiporia mediterranea (2012)
- Fomitopsis pinicola (2012)
- Ganoderma leucocontextum strain:GL72 (2023)
- Gloeophyllum trabeum (2012)
- Hebeloma cylindrosporum http://genome.jgi.doe.gov/Hebcy2/Hebcy2.home.html
- Heterobasidion annosum, plant pathogen (2009)
- Laccaria bicolor Strain:S238N-H82, mycorrhiza (2008)
- Lentinula edodes, Shiitake mushroom (2016)
- Moniliophthora perniciosa, Witches' Broom Disease of cacao (2008)
- Oudemansiella raphanipes, edible mushroom "Changgengu"(2023)
- Phanerochaete chrysosporium Strain:RP78, mycoremediation (2004)
- Piriformospora indica endophyte (2011)
- Pleurotus ostreatus, industrial/lignin degrader (2010)
- Pleurotus tuber-regium, White-rot fungus (2018)
- Polyporus umbellatus - a well-known medicinal fungus in Asia
- Postia placenta, cellulose degrader (2008)
- Punctularia strigosozonata (2012)
- Schizophyllum commune, mushroom (2010)
- Serpula lacrymans, plant pathogen (2011)
- Stereum hirsutum (2012)
- Trametes versicolor (2012)
- Wolfiporia cocos (2012)

=== Dacrymycetes ===
- Dacryopinax spathularia, edible jelly fungus (2024)

=== Pucciniomycetes (formerly Urediniomycetes) ===
- Melampsora laricis-populina, pathogen of poplars (2008)
- Puccinia graminis f. sp. tritici, plant pathogen (2011)
- Puccinia polysora f.sp. zeae - a giga-scale fungal pathogen causing southern corn rust
- Puccinia triticina 1-1 BBBD Race 1, pathogen of wheat
- Rhodotorula graminis strain WP1, plant symbiont (2010)
- Sporobolomyces roseus, associated with plants

=== Tremellomycetes ===
- Cryptococcus (Filobasidiella) neoformans JEC21, human pathogen (2005, other strains unpubl.)
- Dacryopinax sp. (2012)
- Tremella mesenterica (2012)

=== Ustilaginomycetes ===
- Malassezia globosa CBS 7966, dandruff-associated (2007)
- Malassezia restricta CBS 7877, dandruff-associated (2007)
- Sporisorium rellianum, plant pathogen (2010)
- Ustilago maydis, plant pathogen (2006)

=== Wallemiomycetes ===
- Wallemia ichthyophaga, obligate halophile (2013)
- Wallemia sebi, xerophile (2012)

== Chytridiomycota ==
Chytridiomycota includes fungi with spores that have flagella (zoospores) and are a sister group to more advanced land fungi that lack flagella. Several chytrid species are pathogens, but have not had their genomes sequenced yet.

- Batrachochytrium dendrobatidis JEL423, amphibian pathogen (2006)
- Batrachochytrium dendrobatidis JAM81, amphibian pathogen (2006)
- Spizellomyces punctatus DAOM BR117 (2009)
- Gonapodya prolifera JEL478 (Monoblepharidomycetes) (2011)
- Chytriomyces sp. MP 71
- Entophlycits helioformis JEL805
- Gaertneriomyces semiglobifer Barr43
- Globomyces pollinis-pini
- Rhizoclomsatium globosum

== Blastocladiomycota ==
- Allomyces macrogynus ATCC 38327 (Blastocladiomycota) (2009)
- Catenaria anguillulae PL171 (Blastocladiomycota)

== Neocallimastigomycota ==
- Piromyces sp. E2 (Neocallimastigomycota) (2011)
- Anaeromyces sp. S4
- Neocallimastix sp. G1
- Orpinomyces sp. C1A

== Microsporidia ==
- Encephalitozoon cuniculi, human pathogen (2001)
- Encephalitozoon intestinalis ATCC 50506, human pathogen (2010)
- Enterocytozoon bieneusi, human pathogen particularly in the context of HIV infection (~60% of genome 2009, 2010)
- Nosema ceranae, honey bee pathogen (2009)
- Octosporea bayeri OER 3-3, Daphnia pathogen (2009)

== Mucoromycota ==
=== Mucoromycotina ===
- Absidia padenii
- Absidia repens
- Backusella circina
- Circinella umbellata
- Cokeromyces recurvatus
- Cunninghamella echinulata
- Dichotomocladium elegans
- Fennellomyces sp.
- Gilbertella persicaria var. persicaria
- Gongronella butleri
- Hesseltinella vesiculosa
- Lichtheimia corymbifera
- Lichtheimia hyalospora
- Mucor circinelloides
- Mucor cordense
- Mucor indicus
- Mucor heterogamus
- Mycotypha africana
- Parasitella parasitica
- Phascolomyces articulosus
- Phycomyces blakesleeanus
- Phycomyces nitens
- Pilaira anomala
- Pilobolus umbonatus
- Radiomyces spectabilis
- Rhizopus delemar
- Rhizopus oryzae, human pathogen (mucormycosis) (2009)
- Rhizopus microsporus
- Saksenaea vasiformis
- Spinellus fuiger
- Sporodiniella umbellata
- Syncephalastrum racemosum
- Thamnidium elegans
- Umbelopsis isabellina
- Umbelopsis ramanniana
- Zychaea mexicana

=== Glomeromycotina ===
- Rhizophagus irregularis

=== Mortierellomycotina ===
- Mortierella alpina Strain: ATCC 32222, commercial source of arachidonic acid (2011)
- Lobosporangium transversale
- Mortierella elongata
- Mortierella humilis
- Mortierella multidivaricata
- Mortierella verticillata

== Zoopagomycota ==
=== Kickxellomycotina ===
- Coemansia reversa
- Coemansia spiralis
- Kickxella alabastrina
- Linderina pennicpora
- Martensiomyces pterosporus
- Ramicandelaber brevisporus
- Smittium culicis
- Smittium mucronatum
- Zancudomyces culisetae

=== Entomophthoromycotina ===
- Basidiobolus meristosporus
- Conidiobolus coronatus
- Condidiobolus thromboides
- Massospora cicadina

=== Zoopagomycotina ===
- Syncephalis fuscata
- Syncephalis plumigaleata
- Syncephalis pseudoplumigaleata
- Piptocephalis cylindrospora

== See also ==
- Lists of sequenced genomes
- List of sequenced bacterial genomes
- List of sequenced archaeal genomes
- List of sequenced eukaryotic genomes
- List of sequenced mitochondrial genomes
- List of sequenced plastomes
- List of sequenced animal genomes
- List of sequenced animal mitochondrial genomes
- List of sequenced fungi mitochondrial genomes
- List of sequenced plant genomes
- List of sequenced plant mitochondrial genomes
- List of sequenced protist genomes
