= Fungal genome =

Fungal genomes are among the smallest genomes of eukaryotes. The sizes of fungal genomes range from less than 10 Mbp to hundreds of Mbp. The average genome size is approximately 37 Mbp in Ascomycota, 47 Mbp in Basidiomycota and 75 Mbp in Oomycota. The sizes and gene numbers of the smallest genomes of free-living fungi such as those of Wallemia ichthyophaga, Wallemia mellicola or Malassezia restricta are comparable to bacterial genomes. The genome of the extensively researched yeast Saccharomyces cerevisiae contains approximately 12 Mbp and was the first completely sequenced eukaryotic genome. Due to their compact size fungal genomes can be sequenced with less resources than most other eukaryotic genomes and are thus important models for research. Some fungi exist as stable haploid, diploid, or polyploid cells, others change ploidy in response to environmental conditions and aneuploidy is also observed in novel environments or during periods of stress.

== Genome comparisons ==
The comparison of fungal genomes has been used to study the evolution of fungi, to improve the resolution of the phylogeny of fungal species, and to determine the time of the emergence and changes in species traits and lifestyles, such as the evolution of symbiotic or pathogenic interactions, and the evolution of different morphologies. Major chromosomal rearrangements in fungi were found to be more frequent than in other eukaryotes, thus macrosynteny in fungi is rare. However, in filamentous ascomycetes genes were found to be conserved within homologous chromosomes, but with randomized orders and orientations, a phenomenon named mesosynteny. Mesosynteny was also observed in the basidiomycetous genus Rhodotorula. A comparison of more than 1000 Saccharomyces cerevisiae genomes was used to identify the geographical origin and several domestication events of the species as well as map genomic variants to the species-wide phenotypic landscape of the yeast. Comparisons of several genomes of the same species led to discovery of high levels of recombination in species that were previously considered asexual. In the extremely halotolerant black yeast Hortaea werneckii it was discovered that while the species is clonal, both haploid and diploid strains can be found in nature and the diploid strains are highly heterozygous hybrids, which appear to be stable over large time scales and geographical distances.

== Use in taxonomy ==
While genomic distance measures such as the average nucleotide identity (ANI) are used routinely to distinguish bacterial species, the use of fungal genomes in taxonomy is currently rare. Genome sequences can be used to expand the number of genes used in phylogenetic analyses, but many publicly available genomes lack gene annotations and popular rDNA markers are typically missing from genomic sequences or are incorrectly assembled. Suggested measures of overall genome related indices in yeast include ANI, digital DNA–DNA hybridization (dDDH) and K_{r} distance. Genomic collinearity was suggested as a possible source of markers to resolve species complexes. Pairwise Kr genomic distances and average nucleotide identity were used in the description of new species within the genera Aureobasidium and Tilletia.

Alternatively, quick and simple to calculate similarity measures based on MinHash also appear to produce usefully accurate estimates of distance between genomes. For example, a fixed threshold genomic distance calculated using tools such as Mash and Dashing was able to determine whether two genomes belong to the same or to different species with over 90% accuracy, indicating that simple measures of genomic distance might be useful to delineate fungal species and still largely support the existing fungal taxonomy.
