= Hydrophobin =

Fungal hydrophobin
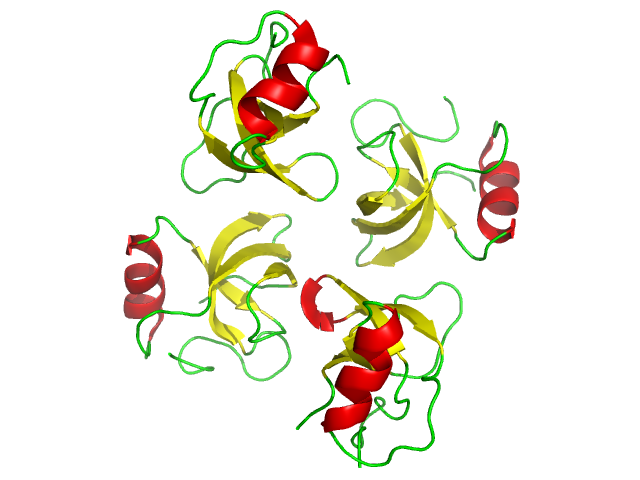
- Structure of hydrophobin HFBII from Trichoderma reesei

Identifiers
- Symbol: Hydrophobin_2
- Pfam: PF06766
- InterPro: IPR010636
- PROSITE: PDOC00739
- SCOP2: 1r2m / SCOPe / SUPFAM
- OPM superfamily: 96
- OPM protein: 1r2m
Available protein structures:
- PDB: IPR010636 PF06766 (ECOD; PDBsum)
- AlphaFold: IPR010636; PF06766

Hydrophobin

Identifiers
- Symbol: Hydrophobin
- Pfam: PF01185
- InterPro: IPR001338
Available protein structures:
- PDB: IPR001338 PF01185 (ECOD; PDBsum)
- AlphaFold: IPR001338; PF01185

Hydrophobins are a group of small (~100 amino acids) cysteine-rich proteins that were discovered in filamentous fungi that are lichenized or not. Later similar proteins were also found in Bacteria. Hydrophobins are known for their ability to form a hydrophobic (water-repellent) coating on the surface of an object. They were first discovered and separated in Schizophyllum commune in 1991. Based on differences in hydropathy patterns and biophysical properties, they can be divided into two categories: class I and class II. Hydrophobins can self-assemble into a monolayer on hydrophilic:hydrophobic interfaces such as a water:air interface. Class I monolayer contains the same core structure as amyloid fibrils, and is positive to Congo red and thioflavin T. The monolayer formed by class I hydrophobins has a highly ordered structure, and can only be dissociated by concentrated trifluoroacetate or formic acid. Monolayer assembly involves large structural rearrangements with respect to the monomer.

Fungi make complex aerial structures and spores even in aqueous environments.

Hydrophobins have been identified in lichens as well as non-lichenized ascomycetes and basidiomycetes; whether they exist in other groups is not known. Hydrophobins are generally found on the outer surface of conidia and of the hyphal wall, and may be involved in mediating contact and communication between the fungus and its environment. Some family members contain multiple copies of the domain.

Hydrophobins have been found to be structurally and functionally similar to cerato-platanins, another group of small cysteine-rich proteins, which also contain a high percentage of hydrophobic amino acids, and are also associated with hyphal growth.

This family of proteins includes the rodlet proteins of Neurospora crassa (gene eas) and Emericella nidulans (gene rodA), these proteins are the main component of the hydrophobic sheath covering the surface of many fungal spores.

Genomic sequencing of two fungi from dry or salty environments (Wallemia sebi and W. ichthyophaga) revealed that these species contain predicted hydrophobins with unusually high proportion of acidic amino acids and therefore with potentially novel characteristics. High proportion of acidic amino acids is thought to be an adaptation of proteins to high concentrations of salt.

== Structure ==
Hydrophobins are characterised by the presence of 8 conserved cysteine residues that form 4 disulphide bonds. They are able to reverse the wettability of surfaces by spontaneous self-assembly of the monomeric proteins into amphipathic monolayers at hydrophobic:hydrophilic surfaces. Despite this common feature, hydrophobins are subdivided into two classes based on differences on their monomeric structure, such as the spacing between the cysteine residues, and based on the different physicochemical properties of the amphipathic monolayers they form. Extensive structural analyses of individual hydrophobins from the two classes have elucidated that the morphological and physical differences between the class I and class II polymer forms are the results of significant structural differences at the monomer-assembly level.

=== Class I ===
Class I hydrophobins are characterised by having a quite diverse amino acid sequence between different types (with exception of the conserved cysteine residues), and compared to class II, they have long, varied inter-cysteine spacing. They form rodlets which have been identified as functional amyloids due to their amyloid-like characteristics as seen in X-ray diffraction studies and confirmed by their capacity to bind to amyloid-specific dyes such as Congo red and Thioflavin T. The formation of rodlets involves conformational changes that lead to formation of an extremely robust β-sheet structure that can only be depolymerised by treatment with strong acids. The rodlets can spontaneously form ordered monolayers by lateral assembly, displaying a regular fibrillary morphology on hydrophobic:hydrophilic interfaces. The most well characterised class I hydrophobin is EAS, which coats the spores of the fungus Neurospora crassa, followed by characterisation of DewA from Aspergillus nidulans.

=== Class II ===
Class II hydrophobins have overall a more conserved amino acid sequence between the different types and, contrary to class I, they have short, regular inter-cysteine spacing. Opposite to class I, the class II hydrophobins monolayer formed at hydrophobic:hydrophilic interfaces is not fibrillar and it is not associated with formation of amyloid-structures, nor with large conformational changes. Nonetheless, high resolution atomic-force microscopy studies revealed the formation of a notable hexagonal repeating pattern over surfaces coated with the class II hydrophobin HBFI, meaning that these proteins are also able to form an ordered network in surface films.

The crystal structures or HFBI and HFBII from Trichoderma reesei were the first class II hydrophobins to be determined.

== Rodlet self-assembly of class I hydrophobins ==
There is special interest in understanding the mechanism underlying class I monomers self-assembly that leads to formation of tough, ordered amphipathic rodlet monolayers, due to their intrinsic properties and due to substantial information available from several characterisation studies of the class I hydrophobins EAS and DewA. These mechanisms have been greatly studied by targeted mutagenesis in an effort to identify the key amino acid sequence regions driving rodlet self-assembly. A model for the monomeric form of EAS was proposed by Kwan et al. (2006) from structural data obtained from NMR spectroscopy and X-ray diffraction experiments that indicated the presence of four-stranded, antiparallel β-barrel core structure in EAS that allows monomer linking through backbone H-bonding. There are secondary elements around this β-barrel core like the Cys3-Cys4 and Cys7-Cys8 loops. This model is consistent with the amyloid-like structure that class I rodlets form, in which the β-strands are oriented perpendicular to the cross-β scaffold axis of the fibre.

Site-directed mutagenesis of EAS has given insights into the specific structural changes responsible for self-assembly of monomers into rodlets and subsequent formation of amphipathic monolayer in hydrophobic:hydrophilic interfaces. Kwan et al. (2008) reported that the long hydrophobic Cys3-Cys4 loop is not required for rodlet assembly because its deletion does not affect the folding and physical properties of the monomeric protein, neither the morphology of the polymeric rodlet form. Instead, a region of the short Cys7-Cys8 loop, containing mainly uncharged polar residues, has been found to be critical for rodlet assembly.

Characterization of EAS secondary elements involved in rodlet assembly have given insights into the mechanism behind class I hydrophobins self-assembly, but important structural differences with DewA, another class I hydrophobin, suggest that the mechanisms driving rodlet assembly vary among different types of hydrophobins. Like EAS, DewA also has a β-barrel core structure, but it differs significantly from it because of its considerable content of helical secondary elements. A unique feature of DewA is its capacity to exist as two types of conformers in solution, both able to form rodlet assemblies but at different rates. Despite these differences in structural and self-assembly mechanisms, both EAS and DewA form robust fibrillar monolayers, meaning that there must exist several pathways, protein sequences and tertiary conformations able to self-assemble into amphipathic monolayers. Further characterisation of both EAS and DewA and their rodlet self-assembly mechanisms will open up opportunities for rational design of hydrophobins with novel biotechnological applications.

== Potentiality for use ==
Since the very first studies that gave insights into the properties of hydrophobins, these small proteins have been regarded as great candidates for technological use. The detailed understanding of the molecular mechanisms underlying hydrophobin self-assembly into amphipathic monolayer in hydrophobic:hydrophilic interfaces is of great academic interest but mainly of commercial interest. This is because a deep understanding of the elements driving these mechanisms would allow engineering of hydrophobins (or other biomolecules) for nano and biotechnological applications. An example is that the hydrophobin-coating of carbon nanotubes was found to increase their solubility and reduce their toxicity, a finding that increases the prospects of carbon nanotubes to be used as vehicles for drug delivery. Other areas of potential use of hydrophobins include:

- Fabrication and coating of nanodevices and medical implants to increase biocompatibility.
- Emulsifiers in food industry and personal care products.
- Hydrophobins' high stability can be very useful in the coating of surfaces of prolonged use or under harsh conditions.
- The easy dissociation of a class II hydrophobin monolayer might be desirable and this can easily be achieved by the use of detergents and alcohols.
- The use of hydrophobins in protein purification, drug delivery and cell attachment has been reported.

For more about the potential biotechnological applications of hydrophobins see Hektor & Scholtmeijer (2005) and Cox & Hooley (2009).
