= Saccharomyces mikatae =

Scientific classification
- Domain: Eukaryota
- Kingdom: Fungi
- Division: Ascomycota
- Class: Saccharomycetes
- Order: Saccharomycetales
- Family: Saccharomycetaceae
- Genus: Saccharomyces
- Species: S. mikatae

Binomial name
- Saccharomyces mikatae Naumov et al. 2000

Species of fungus

Saccharomyces mikatae, a type of yeast in the Saccharomyces sensu stricto complex. Its type strain is NCYC 2888T. The cells are round to short-oval in shape, they arrange singly, in pairs and short-chain. Their budding is multipolar.

== See also ==
- Saccharomyces kudriavzevii
- Saccharomyces cariocanus
- Saccharomyces paradoxus
