= Micro-atmosphere method =

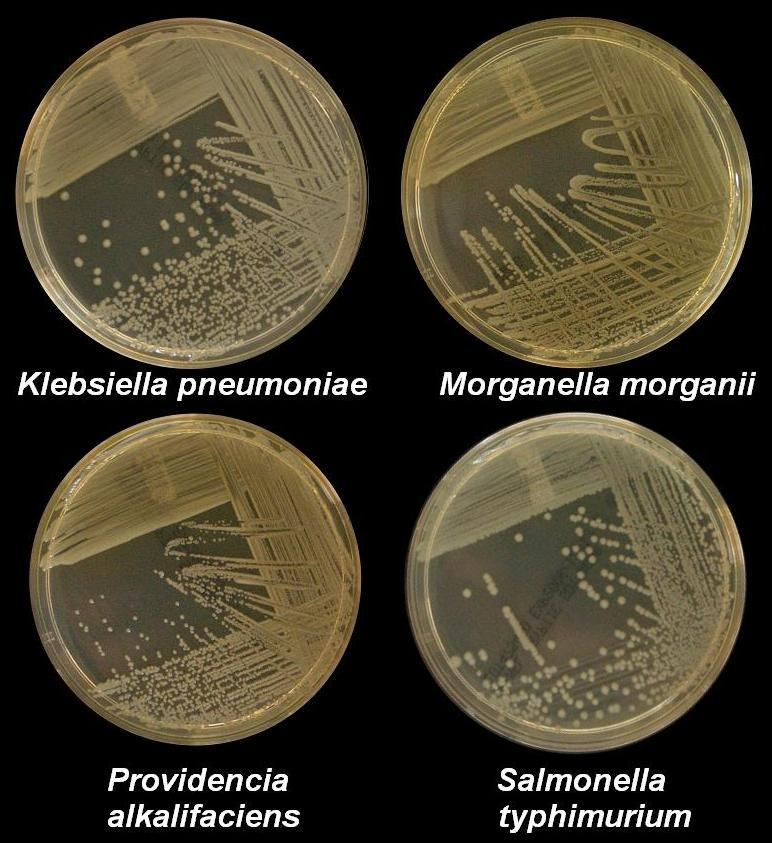
Streak plates of several bacterial species on nutrient agar plates

The micro-atmosphere method is an antimicrobial sensitivity testing method involving the use of potentially bacteriostatic or fungicidal compounds which are obtained from the volatile oils of plants, such as citronella grass. This method involves the use of essential oils, a growth medium, a selection of bacterial or fungal cultures, and an incubator.

== Method ==
In this microbiological procedure, theoretically, the antibacterial or anti-fungal activity of the volatile oils from a chosen plant may be tested against a selection of gram-positive and gram-negative bacteria or a species of fungus. The growth of the bacteria or fungi are then monitored on a timely basis to measure the bacteriostatic or anti-fungal activity of the volatile oils. In some cases, a complete inhibition of growth for the bacteria tested can be observed.

== Dilution of essential oils ==
Before it can be tested, the essential oils are first diluted to produce solutions of varying concentrations. In this way, the minimum inhibitory concentration can be calculated to obtain the most cost-effective antimicrobial agent.

== Antibacterial activity ==
Until recently, the antibacterial activity of essential oils has been primarily evaluated through direct contact methods between the pathogen and the antimicrobial agent through diffusion and dilution methods, however the role of essential oils in the vapour phase as antimicrobial agents is gaining increasing significance.

This method was developed on the premise that essential oil vapours exert critical biological activity. These methods offer rapid screening protocols for the antimicrobial assessment of plant essential oils. It has been suggested that essential oils in the vapour phase possess the greatest degree of antimicrobial activity since the active constituents are highly volatile in nature and thus, the vapour is therefore the contributing attribute for its biological activity. Each individual constituent has differing volatility, therefore when the mixtures are introduced into a free, non-saturated state in a closed micro-environment; the volatile constituents begin to disperse at differing rates in the vapour phase within the headspace according to their degree of volatility until they reach equilibrium.

Preliminary research involving the essential oils of citronella yielded promising results when tested against a selection of Gram-positive bacteria and Gram-negative bacteria. The use of such extracts can be explored especially in the development of cost-effective treatments of respiratory illness, specifically of those caused by bacterial or fungal infection. Preliminary tests exhibit complete inhibition of the growth of certain bacterial strains.

== Anti-fungal activity ==
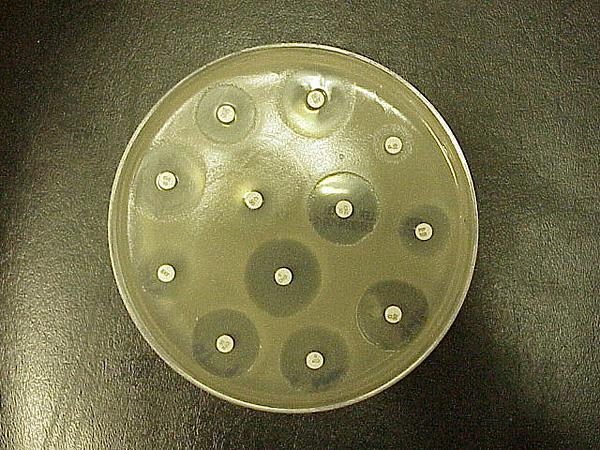
Kirby–Bauer testing: White wafers containing antibiotics shown on plate of bacteria. Circles of poor bacterial growth surround some wafers, indicating susceptibility to the antibiotic

In a separate research, the micro-atmosphere method was used to investigate the anti-fungal efficacy of the essential oils from the cinnamon, a plant belonging to the genus Cinnamomum.

The procedure was employed to ensure that the active films, the material containing the active compound, does not come into direct contact to the tested fungal suspension.

The micro-atmosphere method was performed, in order to evaluate the indirect effects of active films against P. digitatum. Addition of 0.5% cinnamon essential oil, led to 12% inhibition of fungal growth. Higher anti-fungal effects were obtained by adding higher amounts of the essential oil. An inhibition of fungal growth between 28% and 50% were observed for the films incorporated with 1.5% and 3% essential oil, respectively.

In this particular research, the potential anti-fungal agent was subjected to both disk diffusion test and the micro-atmosphere method for comparison and to get an idea of how the active compound may be utilized. The active compound exhibited higher anti-fungal effects in the disc diffusion test compared to the micro-atmosphere assays. This could be attributed to the fact that in the disc diffusion test, both direct contact and migration of active compounds from the film to the outside induced the observed antimicrobial effects. On the other hand, only the migration of the volatile compounds to the headspace, may cause the anti-fungal effect in the micro-atmosphere method.
