= Penicillium sanguifluum =

Scientific classification
- Domain: Eukaryota
- Kingdom: Fungi
- Division: Ascomycota
- Class: Eurotiomycetes
- Order: Eurotiales
- Family: Aspergillaceae
- Genus: Penicillium
- Species: P. sanguifluum

Binomial name
- Penicillium sanguifluum (Sopp) Biourge (1923)

Synonyms
- Citromyces sanguifluus Sopp (1912)

Species of fungus

Penicillium sanguifluum is a species of fungus in the genus Penicillium. It was first described scientifically in 1912 by Norwegian mycologist Olav Johan Sopp, who called it Citromyces sanguifluus. Philibert Biourge transferred it to the genus Penicillium in 1923. P. sanguifluum is classified in the section Citrina of Penicillium.
