= Saccharomyces kudriavzevii =

Scientific classification
- Domain: Eukaryota
- Kingdom: Fungi
- Division: Ascomycota
- Class: Saccharomycetes
- Order: Saccharomycetales
- Family: Saccharomycetaceae
- Genus: Saccharomyces
- Species: S. kudriavzevii

Binomial name
- Saccharomyces kudriavzevii Naumov et al. 2000

Species of fungus

Saccharomyces kudriavzevii, is a species of yeast in the Saccharomyces sensu stricto complex. Its type strain is NCYC 2889T. It is used in production of alcoholic beverages, including pinot noir wine, and hybrids of it are used in beer brewing. It is isolated widely from the bark of oak trees (Quercus family).

== Etymology ==
“Kudriavzevii” was named in honor of VI Kudriavzev, a Russian scientist who worked with yeast taxonomy and ecology, and also played a large role in introducing the wild strain of S. paradoxus into science.

Other names include:

· S. kudriavzevii is the common scientific name

· Pinot Noir yeast

== History ==
Saccharomyces kudriavzevii was initially isolated from decayed leaf (Kaneko & Banno, 1991) but is often isolated from bark of oak trees.

== Description ==
The species belongs to the Saccharomyces genus and can be isolated from a variety of substrates and is unique in that it cannot live on galactose and is cryotolerant.

== Biology ==
=== Ecology ===
It has mainly been isolated from the leaves and bark of oak trees. Optimal growth for many yeasts occurs at 30 – 35 °C, but S. kudriavzevii is adapted to grow at much colder temperatures. Two related wild populations have been found, one in Europe, and one in Asia, but it has never been isolated on other continents.

=== Hybridization ===
Many species within the Saccharomyces sensu stricto clade have been found to hybridize with other species, S. kudriavzevii included. In particular, it hybridizes with S. cerevisiae. This hybridization is unique in that it likely resulted from a single hybridization event involving creation of chimeric chromosomes holding some S. kudriavzevii genes and some S. cerevisiae genes.

=== In biological research ===
The hybridization tendencies of S. kudriavzevii have potential for use in investigation regarding yeast evolution, which is commonly used as a model system for evolution in general. Research on S. kudriavzevii has offered insights on how yeast evolve to survive in new environments and also how they hybridize to form new species.

== Uses ==
S. kudriavzevii is commonly used in production of alcoholic beverages such as pinot noir wine. It can be hybridized with S. cerevisiae and such hybrids are widely used in traditional Belgian beer brewing.

== See also ==
- Saccharomyces cariocanus
- Saccharomyces mikatae
- Saccharomyces paradoxus
