= Sopp =

Sopp may refer to:

- bread soaked in milk
- Adam Sopp (born 1986), British actor
- Austin Sopp (born 1994), known as Austin Gunn, American professional wrestler
- Colten Sopp (born 1991), known as Colten Gunn, American professional wrestler
- Monty Sopp, better known as Billy Gunn (born 1963), American professional wrestler and father of Austin and Colten
- Olav Johan Sopp (1860–1931), Norwegian mycologist
