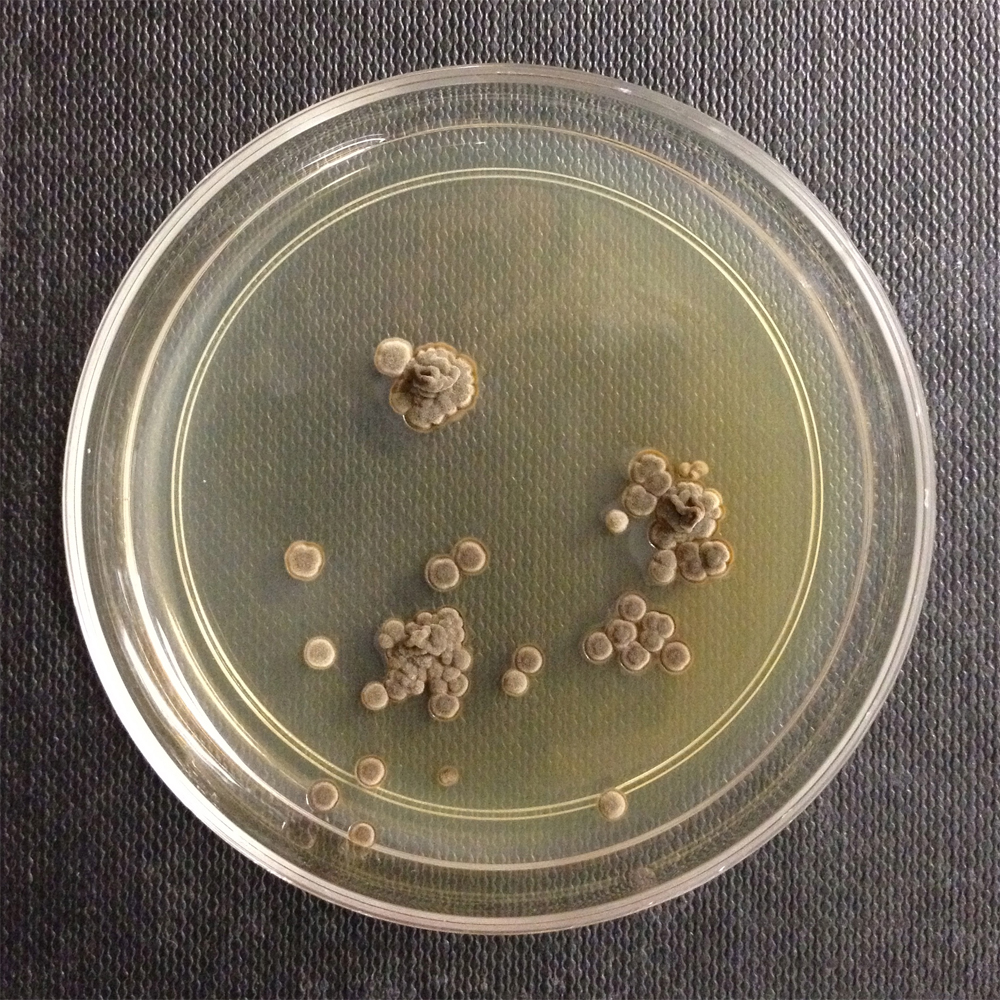
- Wallemia sebi

Scientific classification
- Kingdom: Fungi
- Division: Basidiomycota
- Class: Wallemiomycetes; Zalar, de Hoog, & Schroers (2005)
- Order: Wallemiales; Zalar, de Hoog, & Schroers (2005)
- Family: Wallemiaceae; R.T. Moore (1966)
- Genus: Wallemia; Johan-Olsen (1887)

Type species
- Wallemia ichthyophaga Johan-Olsen (1887)

Species
- Wallemia canadensis; Wallemia hederae; Wallemia ichthyophaga; Wallemia mellicola; Wallemia muriae; Wallemia peruviensis; Wallemia sebi; Wallemia tropicalis

Synonyms
- Hemispora Vuillemin 1906

= Wallemiomycetes =

Class of fungi

The Wallemiomycetes are a class of fungi in the division Basidiomycota. It consists of the single order Wallemiales, containing the single family Wallemiaceae, which in turn contains the single genus Wallemia. The phylogenetic origin of the lineage was placed to various parts of Basidiomycota, but according to the analysis of a larger dataset it is a sister group of Agaricomycotina. The genus contains species of xerophilic molds that are found worldwide. The seven described species (W. sebi, W. ichthyophaga, W. muriae, W. mellicola, W. canadensis, W. tropicalis, and W. hederae) are distinguished by conidial size, xerotolerance, halotolerance, chaotolerance, growth temperature regimes, extracellular enzyme activity profiles, and secondary metabolite patterns. They are typically isolated from low-moisture foods (such as cakes, bread, sugar, peanuts, dried fish), indoor air dust, salterns and soil. W. sebi is thought to be one of the causes of the hypersensitivity pneumonitis known as the farmer's lung disease, but since the other species were recognised and separated from W. sebi only recently, their role in the disease cannot be excluded.

Tolerance to low water activity is generally much more frequent among ascomycetous than basidomycetous fungi, and xerotolerant fungi are also able to grow in regular growth media with normal water activity (unlike, for example, halophilic Archaea). However, species from the genus Wallemia are an exception to both of these rules: all species can tolerate high concentrations of sugars and salts (W. ichthyophaga grows even in media saturated with sodium chloride), while W. muriae and W. ichthyophaga cannot be cultivated unless the water activity of the medium is lowered.

Studies on Wallemia sebi showed that it produces numerous secondary metabolic compounds, including walleminol, walleminone, wallemia A and C, and azasteroid UCA1064-B. A comprehensive research on other species of the class discovered that secondary metabolites are consistently produced by Wallemiomycetes and their production is – contrary to common presumptions – increased as a response to increasing NaCl concentration. In particular an increase in NaCl concentration from 5% to 15% in the growth media increased the production of the toxic metabolites wallimidione, walleminol and walleminone.

Cell wall and morphological changes of Wallemia species are thought to play a major role in adaptation to low water activity.

The whole genome sequences of W. sebi and W. ichthyophaga are available.
