= Tinea nigra =

- Other names: Superficial phaeohyphomycosis, tinea nigra plantaris, tinea nigra palmaris et plantaris
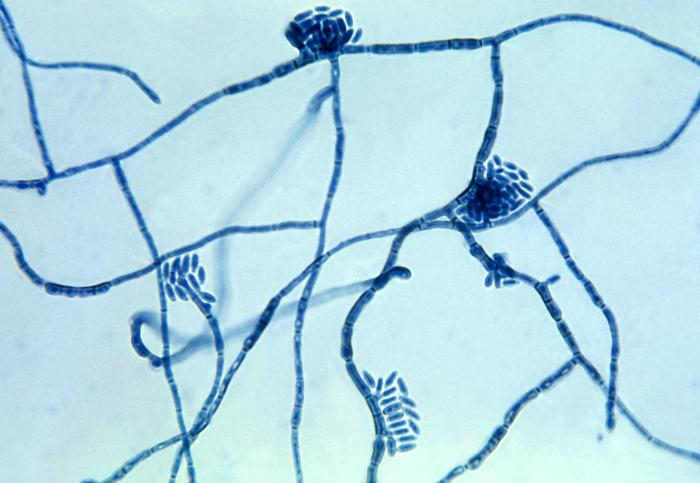
- Micrograph of the fungus Hortaea werneckii, the causative agent of tinea nigra
- Specialty: Dermatology
- Symptoms: One or more dark brown/black, painless spots on palms or soles
- Causes: Hortaea werneckii
- Diagnostic method: Visualisation, dermoscopy, microscopy and culture
- Treatment: Antifungals, scraping the lesion
- Medication: Topical Whitfield's ointment or salicylic acid ointment, or oral itraconazole

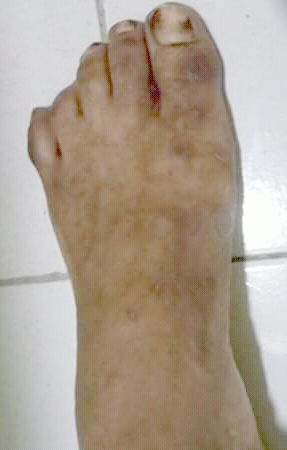

Tinea nigra, also known as superficial phaeohyphomycosis and Tinea nigra palmaris et plantaris, is a superficial fungal infection, a type of phaeohyphomycosis rather than a tinea, that causes usually a single 1–5 cm dark brown-black, non-scaly, flat, painless patch on the palms of the hands and the soles of the feet of healthy people. There may be multiple spots. The macules occasionally extend to the fingers, toes, and nails, and may be reported on the chest, neck, or genital area. Tinea nigra infections can present with multiple macules that can be mottled or velvety in appearance, and may be oval or irregular in shape. The macules can be anywhere from a few mm to several cm in size.

Most cases are caused by Hortaea werneckii, a pigmented fungus, which is a dark yeast found in sewage, soil, rotting vegetation and wood and in places with a high salt content such as moldy salted fish and on beaches, where contact with sand may result in transmission. Infection is by direct contact and the fungus enters and remains in the outer dead layer of skin with little or no skin inflammation. The infection does not invade deeper tissues.

Diagnosis is by visualisation, dermoscopy, and microscopy and culture of skin scrapings. Differential diagnosis includes Addison's disease, syphilis, pinta, yaws, melanoma, lentigines, lichen planus of the palms, and junctional melanocytes nevus. Treatment is with topical Whitfield's ointment or salicylic acid ointment. Topical antifungals or oral itraconazole are other options. Scraping the lesion can be curative. Prevention is by general hygiene measures.

It is uncommon. It generally occurs in tropical and subtropical countries of Central and South America, the Caribbean, Europe, South East Asia, Australia and the Far East. The disease was first described by Alexandre Cerqueira from Brazil in 1891. No cases in animals have been reported.

== Signs and symptoms ==
Tinea nigra usually presents as a single 1–5 cm dark brown-black, non-scaly, flat, painless patch on the palms of the hands and less frequently the soles of the feet of healthy people. There may be multiple spots. The macules occasionally extend to the fingers, toes, and nails, and may be reported on the chest, neck, or genital area. Tinea nigra infections can present with multiple macules that can be mottled or velvety in appearance, and may be oval or irregular in shape. The macules can be anywhere from a few mm to several cm in size.

== Causes ==
This infection is caused by the fungus formerly classified as Cladosporium werneckii, but more recently classified as Hortaea werneckii. The causative organism has also been described as Phaeoannellomyces werneckii. Tinea nigra is extremely superficial and can be removed from the skin by forceful scraping. It tends to appear in areas where eccrine sweat glands are highly concentrated. Infections generally start to appear on the skin around 2–7 weeks post inoculation. The ability of H. werneckii to tolerate high salt concentrations and acidic conditions allows it to flourish inside the stratum corneum. H. wernickii tends remain localized in one spot or region, and produces darkly-colored, brown macules on the skin due to the production of a melanin-like substance.

== Diagnosis ==
Diagnosis of tinea nigra is made based on microscopic examination of stratum corneum skin scrapings obtained by using a scalpel. The scrapings are mixed with potassium hydroxide (KOH). The KOH lyses the nonfungal debris. The skin scrapings are cultured on Sabouraud's agar at 25°C and allowed to grow for about a week. H. werneckii can generally be distinguished due to its two-celled yeast form and the presence of septate hyphae with thick, darkly pigmented walls.

== Treatment ==
Treatment consists of topical application of dandruff shampoo, which contains selenium sulfide, over the skin. Topical antifungal azoles such as ketoconazole, itraconazole, and miconazole may also be used. Azoles are generally used twice daily for a two-week period. This is the same treatment plan for tinea or pityriasis versicolor. Other treatment methods include the use of epidermal tape stripping, undecylenic acid, and other topical agents such as ciclopirox. Once a tinea nigra infection has been eradicated from the host, it is not likely to reoccur.

== Epidemiology ==
Tinea nigra is commonly found in Africa, Asia, Central America, and South America. It is typically not found in the United States or Europe, although cases have been documented in the Southeastern United States. People of all ages can be infected; however, it is generally more apparent in children and younger adults. Females are three times more likely than males to become infected.

== See also ==
- List of cutaneous conditions
