= RodA =

RodA is a class I 14 kDa hydrophobin protein which is known to coat the spores and conidia of the filamentous fungi Aspergillus fumigatus. Mutants of A. fumigatus, whose rodA gene is knocked out, are characterized by a decreased ability to adhere to proteins such as bovine serum albumin and collagen, in addition to the inability to disperse their conidia. It has been suggested that the rodA coating of A. fumigatus spores serves a role in masking the pathogen from the host immune response.
