= Clavispora lusitaniae =

Scientific classification
- Kingdom: Fungi
- Division: Ascomycota
- Class: Saccharomycetes
- Order: Saccharomycetales
- Family: Metschnikowiaceae
- Genus: Clavispora
- Species: C. lusitaniae

Binomial name
- Clavispora lusitaniae Rodr. Mir.

Synonyms
- Candida lusitaniae Uden & Carmo Souza

Species of fungus

Clavispora lusitaniae, formerly also known by the anamorph name Candida lusitaniae, is a species of yeast in the genus Candida or Clavispora. The species name is a teleomorph name.

Clavispora lusitaniae was first identified as a human pathogen in 1979.

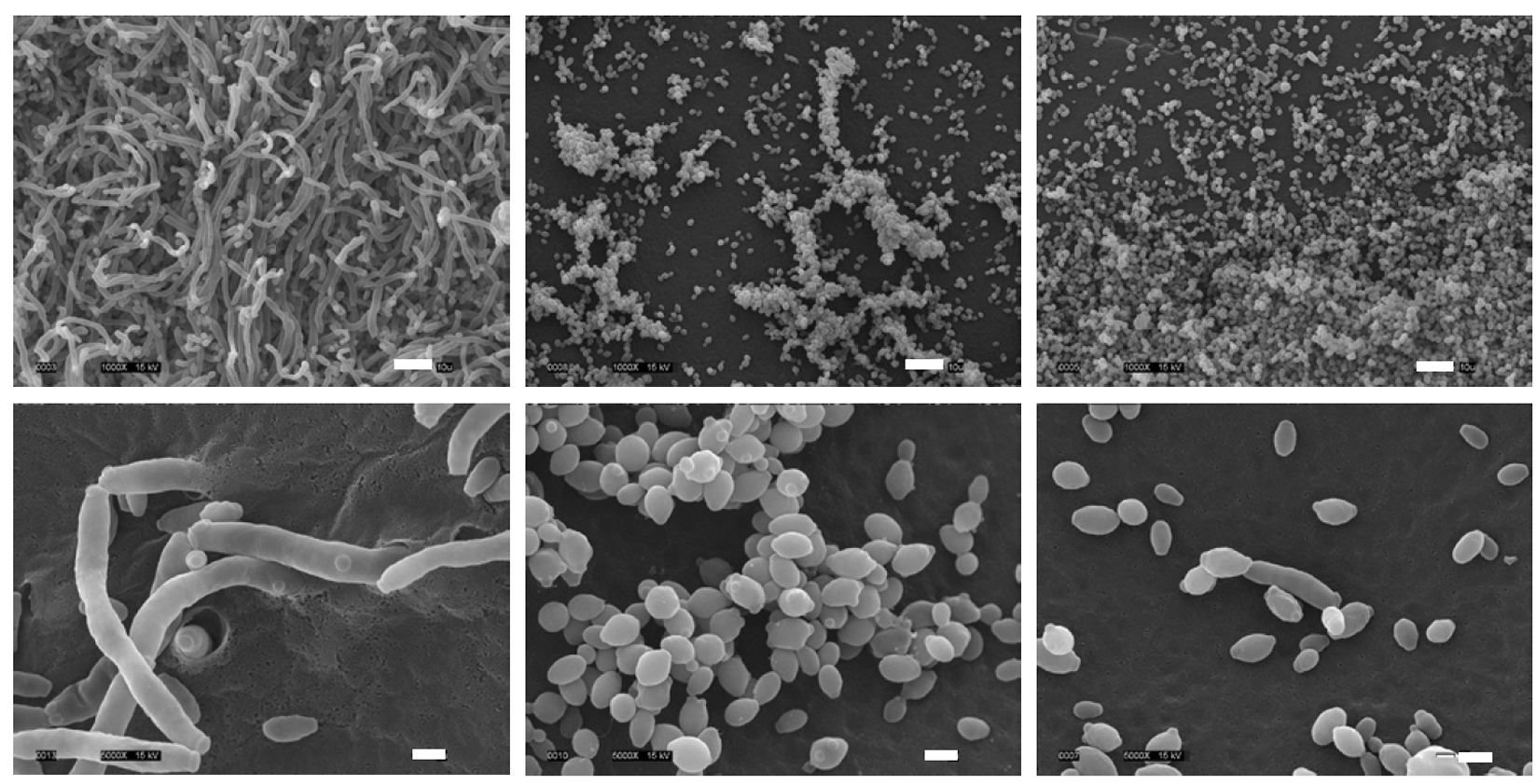
Scanning electron microscopy (SEM) images of C. lusitaniae on filament-inducing media. Cells grown on V8 (pH = 7) media for 7 days at 37 °C were processed for SEM, and imaged (see Materials and Methods). Scale bars for upper panel (1000x) and lower panel (5000x) images represent 10 μm and 2 μm, respectively. WT (ATCC42720), cnb1 mutant (YC198), and crz1 mutant (YC187)

Clavispora lusitaniae was initially described as a rare cause of fungemia, with fewer than 30 cases reported between 1979 and 1990. However, there has been a marked increase in the number of recognized cases of candidemia due to this organism in the last two decades. Bone marrow transplantation and high-dose cytoreductive chemotherapy have both been identified as risk factors for infections with this organism. These patients are often neutropenic for extended periods of time, leaving them susceptible to bacterial and fungal infections, including Candidal infections. A study found that C. lusitaniae was responsible for 19% of all breakthrough fungemia infections in cancer patients between 1998 and 2013.

Some investigators have theorized that the widespread use of Amphotericin B empiric antifungal therapy selects for infections with Candida lusitaniae.

The U.S. CDC has cautioned that the use of the teleomorph name Clavispora lusitaniae for the species can be misleading, because it does not "include the word Candida even though this organism is indeed a species of Candida".
