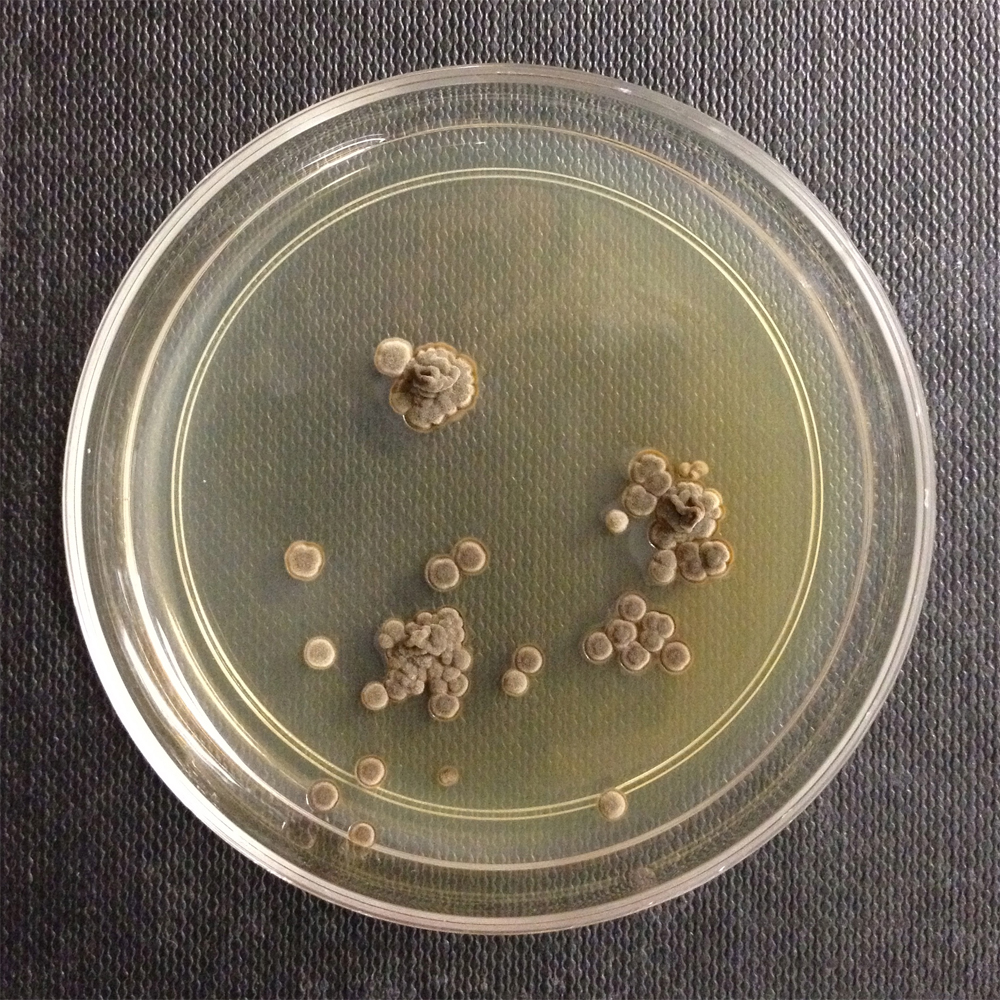
- Wallemia sebi colonies

Scientific classification
- Kingdom: Fungi
- Division: Basidiomycota
- Class: Wallemiomycetes
- Order: Wallemiales
- Family: Wallemiaceae
- Genus: Wallemia
- Species: W. sebi

Binomial name
- Wallemia sebi (Fr.) Arx (1970)

Synonyms
- Torula epizoa Corda (1829); Sporendonema sebi Fr. (1832); Hemispora stellata Vuill. (1906); Sporendonema epizoum (Corda) Cif. & Redaelli (1934)

= Wallemia sebi =

Species of fungus

Wallemia sebi is a xerophilic fungus of the phylum Basidiomycota.

It is commonly found on highly sugared or salted materials, such as jams, bread, cakes, sugar, bacon, salted meats, and salted fish. It is also found in indoor air, house dust, and soil.

One distinctive feature of W. sebi is its relationship with water activity. Most fungi are profoundly affected by the availability of water. The ability to tolerate environments with low water activity has been found mostly in Ascomycota, but rarely in Basidiomycota. However, W. sebi. can adjust its morphology and physiology to adapt to different environmental conditions and survive osmotic stress. Wallemia sebi have lower limits for growth below water activity of 0.75 (0.69-0.75)aw, while most microorganisms are limited to 0.95 and above.

Wallemia sebi has been isolated from hair, hay, textiles and man. It can grow slowly without additional solute in the growth medium, and form small, reddish-brown, powdery colonies.

== Taxonomy ==
Wallemia sebi is currently recognized as a species of the genus Wallemia, which is first introduced by Johan-Olsen in 1887 for a single species W.ichthyophaga Johan-Olsen. A large number of synonyms were used before it was classified in Wallemia, including Torula epizoa Corda, Sporendonema epizoum Corda, Sporendonema sebi Fr., and Sporotrichum navale Joly. The most commonly used synonyms is S. sebi, which was named to refer to the fact that the conidia are endospores. It was only until 1970, when von Arx synonymized Sporendonema with Wallemia, W.sebi is combined with S. sebi.

After a taxonomic revision in 2005 two other species were recognised in the genus, W. muriae (another xerophilic species) and the halophilic W. ichthyophaga. Wallemia sebi was distinguished from the other two in that it showed growth also on media without additional solutes, while W. ichthyophaga and W. muriae grow only in the present of additional solutes. In 2015 W. sebi was further split into W. sebi sensu stricto and three new species described as W. mellicola, W. canadensis, and W. tropicalis. The species differ in their conidial size, xerotolerance, halotolerance, chaotolerance, growth temperature regimes, extracellular enzyme activity profiles, and secondary metabolite patterns.

== History ==
The earliest synonym of W. sebi recorded is Torula epizoa Corda, which is originated from salty meat in Belgium in 1829. In 1832, Fries synonymized Torula epizoa Corda as Sporendonema sebi that describe tasteless solid fat extracted from animal fat. Sporendonema sebi was commonly used in literatures until in 1977 when von Arx synonymized genus Sporendonema and Wallemia. Wallemia sebi then becomes a popular Wallemia species and frequently cited in studies. Frank and Hess studies the Sporendonema epizoum (synonym of W. sebi) that grow on dried salted fish and suggested it to be halophilic in 1941. Wallemia sebi is now recognized as xerophilic fungi because of independence of solute used to lower the water activity. Pitt and Hocking report that W.sebi grows more rapidly in NaCl that other solutes at neutral pH, but have no requirement for NaCl as a solute in 1977. This species is abundant in house dust and suspected to be a causative agent for atopic diseases in the study conducted by Sakamono et al. in 1989. The toxicity of W. sebi was studies and toxins walleminol and walleminon was found in 1990s. (Wood 1990 and Frank et al. 1999) Wallemia sebi was suggested to cause allergological problems resulting in farmer's lung disease in 1998.

== Micromorphology ==
Wallemia sebi has transparent hyphae, that are usually 1.5–2.5 μm wide, forming a compact mycelium. Conidiphores, the specialized stalks for asexual reproduction, are arranged in a parallel fashion and are usually unbranched. The conidiogenous cells are cylindrical and produce arthrospore-like conidia in packages of four. Conidia are cylindrical initially and soon become spherical in shape, approximately 2–2.5 μm in diameter, and form long bending chains up to 1 mm long.

== Growth media ==
Wallemia sebi can grow slowly on specialized fungal media with low water activity without additional solutes. On agar, W. sebi forms small brown colonies with a fine velvety texture, that have long rows of spores that may round up and become free at maturity. The colonies usually can grow to 2-2.5 millimeters, and sometimes to 4 to 5 millimeters in diameter. Wallemia sebi typically grow on MEA, MY50G, W-4 and W-10 agar.

On MEA, the W. sebi colonies grow to 3-6 millimeters in diameter. The colonies formed are usually compact and powdery, and are rust brown to purplish-brown in color. The punctiform colonies are typically spreading deeply into MEA agars. On MY50G, the colonies can grow up to 12 millimeters with yellowish-brown color. The powdery colonies are formed due to the strong sporulation. On W-4 agar, the colonies can grow to 4-8 micrometer in diameter. The exudates can be observed on W-10 agar and they are present as yellow droplets. The shape of colonies in all agars is typically domed with or without short marginal spreading area. The marginal area can be shaggy or irregular with white color or similar color as the colony.

== Genome ==
The genome of Wallemia sebi was published in 2012. After the redefinition of the species in 2015 it was discovered that the sequenced strain belongs to a new species, W. mellicola, and not W. sebi.

== Secondary metabolite and toxicity ==
Wallemia sebi produces secondary metabolic compounds like walleminol, walleminone, wallemia A and C, and azasteroid UCA1064-B A newly conducted study also observes a light yellow oil-like metabolite that produced by W. sebi called wallimidione (1-benzylhexahydroimidazo[1,5-alpha] pyridine-3,5-dione), and it might be the most toxic of all metabolic productions.

The first toxic compound found in W. sebi was isolated and named walleminol A by Wood et al. in 1990 in their study on toxic metabolite of W. sebi. They suggested that walleminol A causes toxic effects in range of in vitro systems such as mammalian cell lines, protozoa and brine shrimp. The toxin contains two hydroxyl groups, four methyl groups, and two or three ring structures in the molecule. The molecular weight of this compound is 236. The toxicity level is comparable with mycotoxins like penicillic acid and citrinin. However, the toxic metabolite only applies in culture environment, the mycotoxin does not necessarily produce in food. A recent study on secondary metabolism of W. sebi found six compounds including walleminone, tryptophol, tryptophol, phenylacetic acid, p-hydroxybenzoic acid, and wallimidione. This study did not isolate walleminol like the previous studies did, but they found new metabolite, wallimidione.

Secondary metabolite production is very dependent on the growth medium, therefore W. sebi might not produce mycotoxins in foods or feeds. However, a study about the influency on water activity of the medium on the production of secondary metabolites by Wallemiomycetes showed that secondary metabolites are consistently produced by Wallemia spp. and their production is – contrary to common presumptions – increased as a response to increasing NaCl concentration. In particular an increase in NaCl concentration from 5% to 15% in the growth media increased the production of the toxic metabolites wallimidione, walleminol and walleminone.

W. sebi has been rarely reported to cause subcutaneous infections in humans.

== Impact on food ==
Wallemia sebi invade food with low water activity, and the food contamination has been reported in many foodstuffs across a broad range of habitats. For example, W. sebi is one of the most common fungi isolated from spices. Along with other xerophilic fungi, they cause loss of flavor and volatile components, production of off-flavors, and clumping in ground spices. Also, W. sebi is considered to be the principal fungus spoiling dried and salted fish. Reports of W. sebi contamination on dried fish comes mostly from temperate regions.W. sebi invasion can make salted and dried fish look brown. Besides dried seafood, it is also commonly found in high sugar foods. W. sebi is typically found in jam and cake. There is also one case report of its discovery on dried fruit, a spoiling fried papaya. In addition, it is found in condensed milk and forms characteristic "bottoms" in sweetened condensed milk. In terms of cereals and bread, there are case reports of isolation of W. sebi on Australian cereals and bread. Finally, Wallemia sebi was found to be a dominant contaminant of milled rice and flours. It can be isolated from brown rice stored for a long time under natural conditions.

Although W. sebi is found to present in a wide range of dried foods, there is little report on mycotoxins being produced in food.

== Impact on built environment ==
=== Building material ===
Fungal growth often need adequate temperatures, nutrient substances, and some level of moisture. The requirements may vary between species. Like other xerophilic fungi, Wallemia sebi would grow on surfaces that are damp rather than wet. Since the indoor environments that is suitable for human habitation often satisfy the growth requirement for W. sebi, W.sebi would be observed in building wallpaper if the water activity is not controlled as low.

The finishing material and moisture level of constructions is critical in terms of fungal growth prevention. Poor moisture control (e.g. fail to dry material in constructions) will result in the growth of hydrophilic and xerophilic fungi. Furthermore, it is more challenging to prevent the growth of xerophile than hydrophilic fungi, because it requires the water activity to be extremely low. For example, dry the building material to the extent of under 0.9 aw water activity only will prevent the growth of hydrophilic fungi, but not capable of controlling the colonization of xerophile. Wallemia sebi, which has low demanding for water, was expected to grow on surfaces with 0.65-0.85 aw. Therefore, in order to prevent the growth of W. sebi, the water activity should be less than 0.65 aw, which can be achieved by drying the materials within forty-eight hours under normal building temperatures.

=== House dust ===
Wallemia sebi is abundant in settled dust in home, it has been first reported in Japan by Sakamoto et al. in 1989. It was also detected in house dust in Canada, USA and western Europe. The potential of fungi in indoor sources to cause asthma is not well documented, but W. sebi is one of the indoor fungi that has been found to cause allergic sensitization.

=== Health effect ===
The health effect of chronic exposure to airborne fungi in indoor environment is known to be associated with both allergens and inflammatory compounds. Exposure to Wallemia sebi is suspected to cause allergic sensitization. One study found twenty percent of children between age of 3 to 14 express IgE sensitization to W. sebi. There are also reports suggest the increase the risk of respiratory symptoms, asthma exasperation, hypersensitivity pneumonitis, rhinosinusitis, bronchitis and respiratory infections associate the exposure of building and house fungi, including W.sebi.
