= Wallemia mellicola =

Scientific classification
- Kingdom: Fungi
- Division: Basidiomycota
- Class: Wallemiomycetes
- Order: Wallemiales
- Family: Wallemiaceae
- Genus: Wallemia
- Species: W. mellicola

Binomial name
- Wallemia mellicola S. Jančič, H.D.T. Nguyen, Seifert & Gunde-Cim. 2015

Species of fungus

Wallemia mellicola is a xerophilic fungus of the phylum Basidiomycota, described in 2015 upon taxonomic revision of the species Wallemia sebi. A large amount of published research referring to W. sebi was likely actually performed on W. mellicola. An example of this is the sequencing of the W. mellicola genome, which was published under the name of W. sebi.

It has a worldwide distribution and is often found in habitats with low accessibility of water, from food preserved with high concentrations of sugar, salt or with drying, to dried straw and house dust. It has rarely been reported as the cause of human infections.

Like other species of the same genus, W. mellicola grows at low water activity, however it is not obligately xerophilic and can grow without additional solute in the growth medium. It grows at salt concentrations up to 24% NaCl, 13% MgCl_{2} and at temperatures between 10 °C and 34 °C.

W. mellicola has a compact genome of 9.8 Mb with few repeats, which is one of the smallest genomes in Basidiomycota and in Agaricomycota. Three gene family expansions that were observed in W. mellicola were considered significant, including heat shock protein, stress responsive alpha-beta barrel, and amino acid transporter, and they may be responsible for the survival W. mellicola at low water activity. Genes involved in High Osmolarity Glycerol signalling pathway were also found and were suggested to play an important role in the adaptation to osmotic stress. Wallemia mellicola also have a large number of transporters that allow it to survive in hyperosmotic conditions. After sequencing the genomes of additional 25 strains of W. mellicola, these was found to form a relatively homogeneous and widespread population. According to population genomic data the species is at least occasionally recombining. Two versions of a putative mating-type locus have been found in the sequenced genomes, each present in approximately half of the strains.
