= Lachancea kluyveri =

Scientific classification
- Domain: Eukaryota
- Kingdom: Fungi
- Division: Ascomycota
- Class: Saccharomycetes
- Order: Saccharomycetales
- Family: Saccharomycetaceae
- Genus: Lachancea
- Species: L. kluyveri

Binomial name
- Lachancea kluyveri (Phaff, M.W.Mill. & Shifrine) Kurtzman (2003)

Synonyms
- Saccharomyces kluyveri Phaff, M.W.Mill. & Shifrine (1956); Torulaspora kluyveri (Phaff, M.W.Mill. & Shifrine) Kock. (1982); Saccharomyces smittii Capr. (1958); Saccharomyces silvestris Jensen (1967)

Species of fungus

Lachancea kluyveri is an ascomycetous yeast associated with fruit flies, slime fluxes, soils and foods.

== Habitat ==
The habitat of L. kluyveri is not well known because only about 30 isolates have been recorded. It is, however, thought to be environmentally widespread. First described as Saccharomyces kluyveri in 1956 from fruit flies in California, this species has been isolated from slime fluxes on tree, soils in North America and Europe, and cheeses. It has also been reported as an agent of disseminated mycosis in a patient with HIV/AIDS.

== Biology ==
Lachancea kluyveri is a budding yeast related to Saccharomyces cerevisiae, or baker's yeast, the model organism intensively used in biochemistry, genetics and cell biology. In 2003 it was transferred from the genus Saccharomyces to the genus Lachancea named for Canadian mycologist and yeast biologist Marc-André Lachance. Saccharomyces cerevisiae and L. kluyveri have several fundamental differences that warrant genomic comparisons. First, like most cell types, L. kluyveri resorts to fermentation (degrading sugars in the absence of oxygen) only when oxygen is limiting. S. cerevisiae, on the other hand, prefers to carry out fermentation even in the presence of oxygen. This means that L. kluyveri makes a more efficient use of glucose for energy production. Therefore, L. kluyveri provides a contrasting model to one of the most unusual features of S. cerevisiae. Second, L. kluyveri has a simpler genome organization than S. cerevisiae: it appears to have become a species before the whole genome duplication that occurred in the Saccharomyces lineage. As a result, its genome is smaller (about 9.5 million base pairs) than that of S. cerevisiae with fewer duplicated genes. Additionally, L. kluyveri is becoming more widely used as a model organism and for industrial applications, such as the production of proteins, since its biomass yield is greater than that of S. cerevisiae due to more efficient use of glucose.

== Sequencing information ==
Genomic information
- NCBI genome ID: 69
- Ploidy: diploid
- Genome size: 12.6 Mb
- Number of chromosomes: 8 pairs
- Year of completion: 2002

The L. kluyveri genome was originally sequenced in 2002 to approximately 3.5× whole genome shotgun (WGS) coverage.
