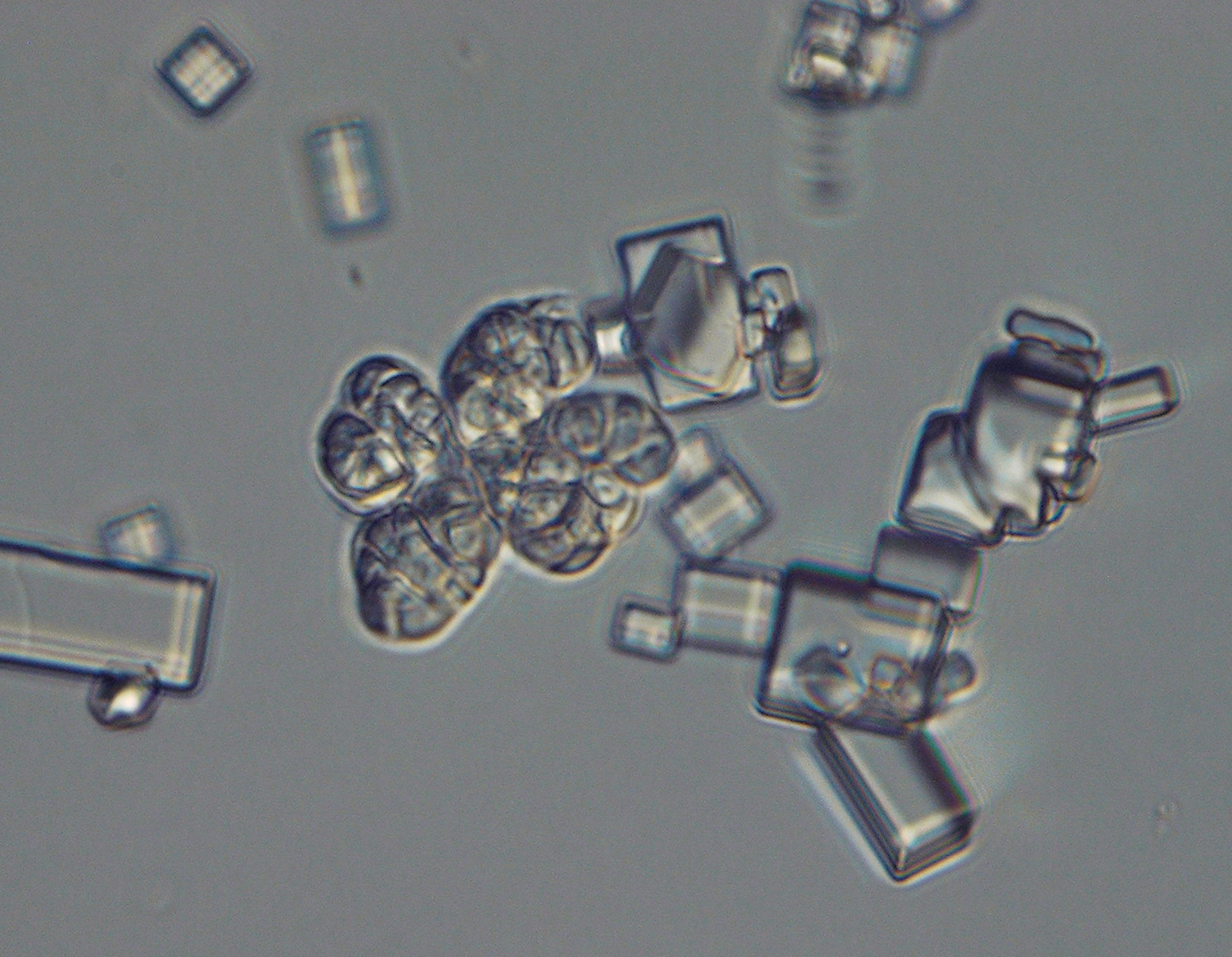
- Micrograph showing characteristic sarcina-like morphology of W. ichthyophaga and crystals of NaCl.

Scientific classification
- Kingdom: Fungi
- Division: Basidiomycota
- Class: Wallemiomycetes
- Order: Wallemiales
- Family: Wallemiaceae
- Genus: Wallemia
- Species: W. ichthyophaga

Binomial name
- Wallemia ichthyophaga Johan-Olsen 1887

= Wallemia ichthyophaga =

Species of fungus

Wallemia ichthyophaga is one of the three species of fungi in the genus Wallemia, which in turn is the only genus of the class Wallemiomycetes. The phylogenetic origin of the lineage was placed to various parts of Basidiomycota, but according to the analysis of larger datasets it is a (495-million-years-old) sister group of Agaricomycotina. Although initially believed to be asexual, population genomics found evidence of recombination between strains and a mating type locus was identified in all sequenced genomes of the species.

Only a limited number of strains of W. ichthyophaga have been isolated so far (from hypersaline water of solar salterns, bitterns (magnesium-rich residual solutions in salt production from sea water) and salted meat).

W. ichthyophaga requires at least 1.5 M NaCl for in-vitro growth (or some other osmolyte for an equivalent water activity), and it thrives even in saturated NaCl solution. This makes it the most halophilic fungus known and distinguishes it from halotolerant (e.g. Aureobasidium pullulans) and extremely halotolerant fungi (e.g. Hortaea werneckii), which are able to grow well even in the absence of salt in the medium. Inability to grow without salt is an exception in the fungal kingdom, but is common in halophilic Archaea.

The fungus grows in the form of sarcina-like structures, or compact multicellular clumps. These increase in size almost four-fold when exposed to high salinity, and the cell wall experiences a three-fold thickening. This results in a substantially decreased functional cell volume and is thought to be one of the halotolerance mechanisms of this species.

The whole genome sequencing of W. ichthyophaga revealed that it has one of the smallest of all sequenced basidiomycetous genomes (9.6 Mbp, only 4884 predicted proteins). Contrary to what was observed for the extremely halotolerant H. werneckii, in W. ichthyophaga there are almost no expansions in metal cation transporter genes and their expression is not salt-responsive. On the other hand, there is a vast enrichment of hydrophobins (proteins of cell wall with diverse functions and many biotechnological uses), which contain an unusually high proportion of acidic amino acids. High proportion of acidic amino acids is thought to be an adaptation of proteins to high concentrations of salt. After sequencing the genomes of nearly all known strains of W. ichthyophaga, population genomic analysis showed that the species forms a single recombining population.
