= CRZ1 =

Protein found in yeast

Transcriptional regulator CRZ1

Identifiers
- Organism: Saccharomyces cerevisiae (Baker's yeast)
- Symbol: CRZ1
- Alt. symbols: HAL8, TCN1
- Entrez: 855704
- Orthologs: NCBI: entry; OMA: entry
- RefSeq (mRNA): NM_001182866
- RefSeq (Prot): NP_014371
- UniProt: P53968

Other data
- Chromosome: XIV: 0.58 - 0.58 Mb
Search for
- Structures: Swiss-model
- Domains: InterPro

CRZ1, short for Calcineurin-Responsive Zinc Finger 1, is a transcription factor that regulates calcineurin dependent-genes in Candida albicans and various other species of yeast.

== Mechanism of action ==
The cytoplasmic protein Crz1 is dephosphorylated by the calcineurin and is then targeted to the nucleus. The nuclear protein activates the transcription of genes involved in cell-wall maintenance and ion homeostasis.

== Structure ==
The protein Crz1 possesses a Zinc-Finger motif that binds to a specific motif called CDRE (Calcineurin-Dependent Response Element) present on the promoter of the targeted genes. It also possesses a nuclear localization signal (NLS) at the N-terminal part
