= Saccharomyces cariocanus =

Scientific classification
- Domain: Eukaryota
- Kingdom: Fungi
- Division: Ascomycota
- Class: Saccharomycetes
- Order: Saccharomycetales
- Family: Saccharomycetaceae
- Genus: Saccharomyces
- Species: S. cariocanus

Binomial name
- Saccharomyces cariocanus G.I.Naumov et al. (2000)

Species of fungus

Saccharomyces cariocanus, a type of yeast in the Saccharomyces sensu stricto complex. Its type strain is NCYC 2890T. Analyses did not confirm the previously observed conspecificity with Saccharomyces paradoxus. S. cariocanus exhibits postzygotic isolation from representative strains from all known geographical populations of S. paradoxus: European, Far-East Asian, North American and Hawaiian.
