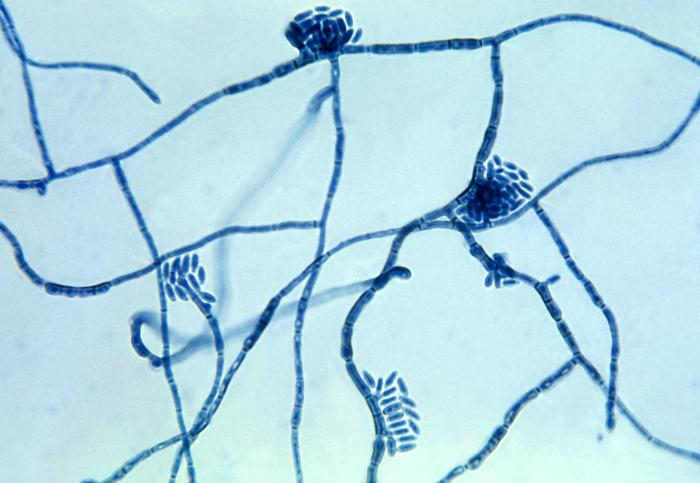
- Micrograph of the fungus Hortaea werneckii

Scientific classification
- Kingdom: Fungi
- Division: Ascomycota
- Class: Dothideomycetes
- Order: Mycosphaerellales
- Family: Teratosphaeriaceae
- Genus: Hortaea; Nishim. & Miyaji
- Species: H. werneckii

Binomial name
- Hortaea werneckii (Horta) Nishim. & Miyaji (1984)

= Hortaea =

Genus of fungi

Hortaea werneckii is a species of yeast in the family Teratosphaeriaceae. It is the only species in the genus Hortaea. It is a black yeast that is investigated for its remarkable halotolerance. While the addition of salt to the medium is not required for its cultivation, H. werneckii can grow in close to saturated NaCl solutions. To emphasize this unusually wide adaptability, and to distinguish H. werneckii from other halotolerant fungi, which have lower maximum salinity limits, some authors describe H. werneckii as "extremely halotolerant".

Several salt-tolerance mechanisms of H. werneckii have been studied on molecular level. For example, it is known that its major compatible solutes are glycerol, erythritol, arabitol, and mannitol; melanin accumulation of the cell wall aids in retention of at least glycerol inside of the cell. Several components of the high osmolarity glycerol (HOG) signalling pathway (which controls responses to osmotic shock) have been studied in detail and some seem to differ in function compared to their counterparts in Saccharomyces cerevisiae. Adaptation to high concentrations of salt are also accompanied by changes in membrane lipid composition, mainly by increasing the unsaturation of the phospholipid fatty acids.

H. werneckii causes a rare superficial and non-invasive skin infection tinea nigra. The typical symptoms are non-scaly, smooth, brown-black painless spots on the palms of hands and soles of feet.

The growth of H. werneckii in liquid media is often yeast-like, although it can switch to filamentous growth. The mechanism of the switch is not known. The cells appear brown because of melanin production.

Whole genome sequencing of H. werneckii revealed a recent whole genome duplication, thought to be the only reported whole-genome duplication among ascomycetous yeasts besides the better known one in the Saccharomyces cerevisiae lineage. Based on genome sequencing of additional strains, 10 out of 12 strains have a genome that was duplicated by several hybridizations between haploid strains, yielding formed stable diploids. Apart from these hybridization events, no signs of sexual reproduction were found. As a consequence, the genome of H. werneckii is relatively large (49.9 Mb) with 15974 predicted genes. Genes encoding metal cation transporters, which are thought to play a role in halotolerance, experienced several additional gene duplications at various points during their evolution.

A homothallic mating locus was found in all sequenced genomes, although one of the mating genes may have been inactivated in some strains. Despite this, phylogenetic analyses and linkage disequilibrium analyses indicate that H. werneckii is asexual.
