= Saccharomyces paradoxus =

Scientific classification
- Kingdom: Fungi
- Division: Ascomycota
- Class: Saccharomycetes
- Order: Saccharomycetales
- Family: Saccharomycetaceae
- Genus: Saccharomyces
- Species: S. paradoxus

Binomial name
- Saccharomyces paradoxus Bach.-Raich., 1914

Species of fungus

Saccharomyces paradoxus is a wild yeast and the closest known species to the baker's yeast Saccharomyces cerevisiae. It is used in population genomics and phylogenetic studies to compare its wild characteristics to laboratory yeasts.

== Ecology ==
Saccharomyces paradoxus is mostly isolated from deciduous trees (oak, maple, birch), and in some rare occasions on insects and fruits. It is often found in sympatry with other Saccharomyces species. Like Saccharomyces cerevisiae, it has a worldwide distribution and it is mesophilic, which limits its natural distribution to low latitudes. However, Saccharomyces paradoxus typically grows at lower temperatures than Saccharomyces cerevisiae, resulting in a slight shift in its distribution toward cooler regions, like British islands and Eastern Canada.

== Biogeography ==
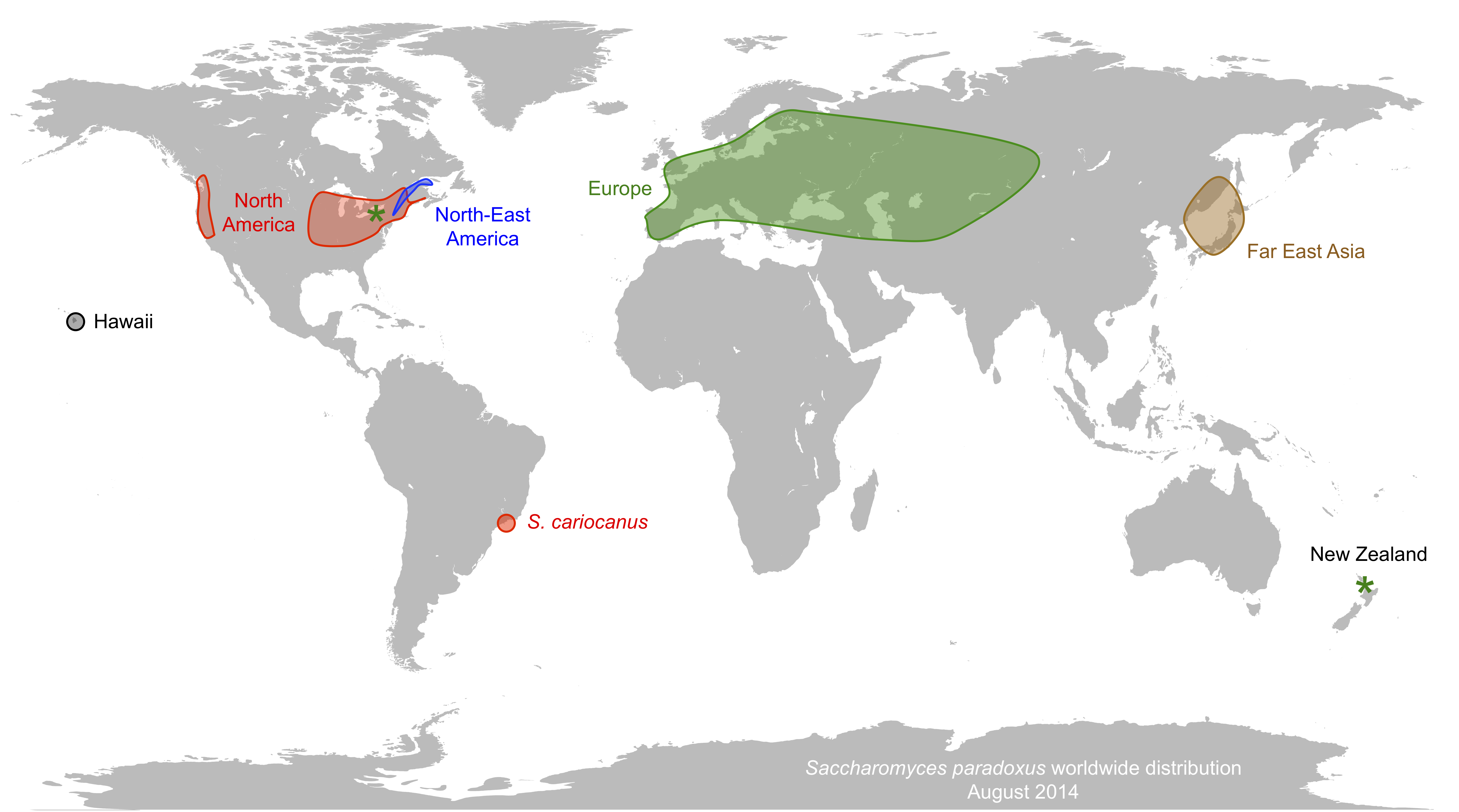
Saccharomyces paradoxus worldwide distribution. Populations are represented in different colours. Green asterisks indicate recent introductions of the European type.

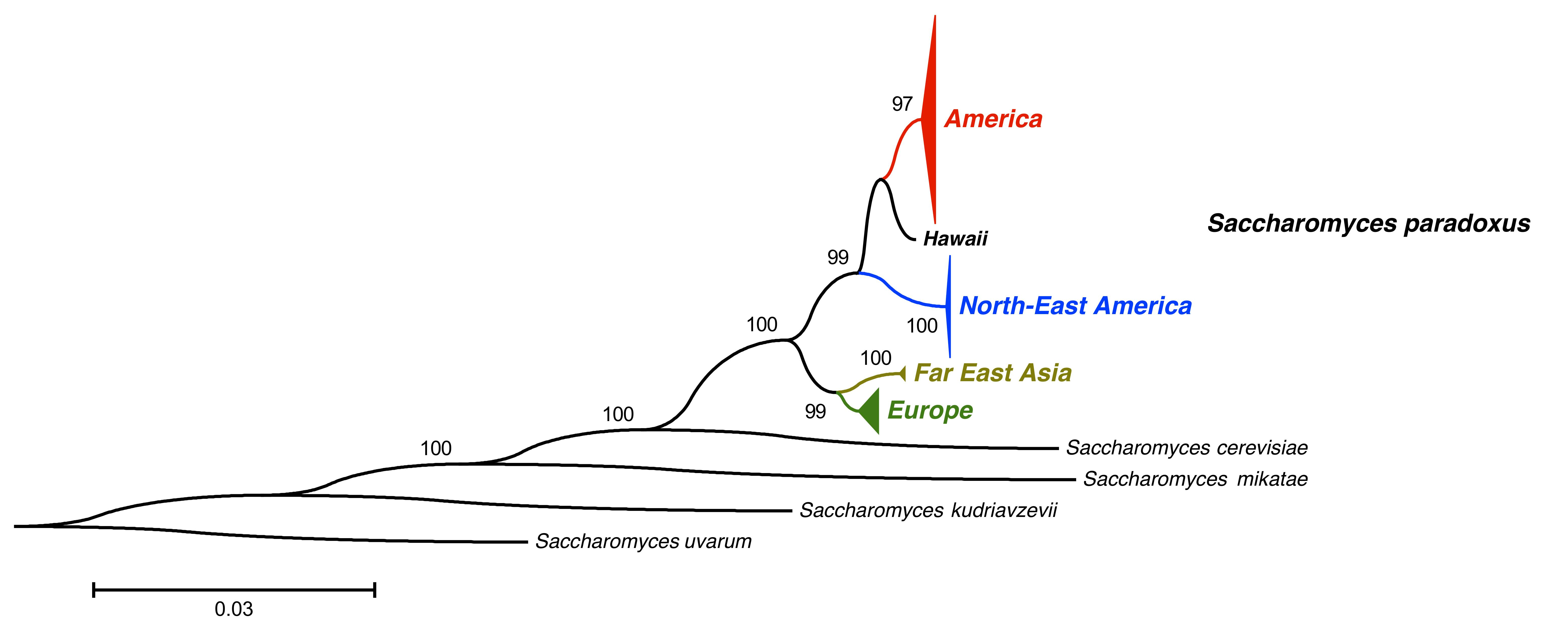
Phylogeny of main Saccharomyces paradoxus populations.

Unlike most other Saccharomyces species, there is no evidence that Saccharomyces paradoxus has been domesticated by humans. Accordingly, its biogeography is mostly marked by natural processes like limited migration, glacial refugia and adaptation to climate. At least four genetically and phenotypically distinct populations of Saccharomyces paradoxus have been identified, corresponding to main geographical divisions: Europe (including West Siberia), Far East Asia (Japan, Eastern Siberia), North America (North American East and West coasts, Great Lakes region) and North-East America (Gaspé Peninsula, Saint Lawrence Valley and Appalaches), respectively. Representative strains of these populations exhibit partial post-zygotic isolation. A fifth population is represented by a singleton isolate from Hawaii. Some strains from the European population are found in North America and New Zealand and likely result from recent colonization events. Two isolates from South America, described as Saccharomyces cariocanus, are genetically indistinguishable but exhibit post-zygotic isolation when crossed to strains from the American population, due to chromosomal translocations.

== Reproduction ==
Saccharomyces paradoxus is naturally homothallic, and is mostly found as diploid in the environment. Reproduction is mostly clonal and 99% of sexual reproduction occurs between spores from the same ascus. This purges recessive deleterious mutations that accumulated during clonal expansion, in a process known as "genome renewal". Post-zygotic isolation between strains of Saccharomyces paradoxus is commonly observed and could be either due to genetic divergence between populations or to chromosomal changes within populations.

Like in other Saccharomyces species, heterothallism can be restored using standard genetic tools, to obtain stable haploid strains for experimental purposes.
