= Olav Johan Sopp =

Norwegian mycologist (1860–1931)

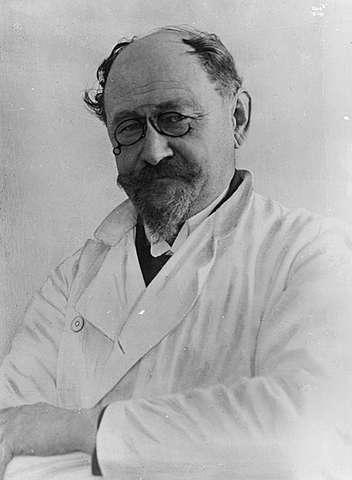
- Sopp in 1922
- Born: Johan Oluf Olsen; 6 October 1860; Hamar, Norway
- Died: 14 August 1931 (aged 70)
- Occupation: mycologist
- Awards: Order of St. Olav (1900)

Olav Johan Sopp (né Johan Oluf Olsen; 6 October 1860 – 14 August 1931) was a Norwegian mycologist. He was a pioneer of Norwegian and international mycological research. He was the first to suggest classifying fungi as belonging to neither plantae nor animalia, but to a third kingdom. He also contributed to the development of the Norwegian dairy and brewery industry.

== Personal life ==
Sopp was born in Hamar as the son of tanner Johannes Bakke Olsen and Bertha Marie Omdahl. He was married to Ingeborg Marie Finckenhagen from 1889 to 1893, and to Caroline Louise Eugenie Ihlen from 1894. From the late 1880s he used the name Olav Johan-Olsen, to avoid name confusion with another person. In 1907 he changed his name to Sopp (meaning "mushroom" in Norwegian). According to his own statement he had been nicknamed "Sop-Olsen" already as a young schoolboy. His daughter was married to politician Ole Colbjørnsen.

== Career ==
After examen artium in 1879 Olsen studied medicine at the Royal Frederick University of Kristiania, where he finished first part in 1882. He had developed a particular interest in mushrooms already as a younger boy. In 1883 he published a book on mushrooms, Spiselig sop, which was reissued several times until 1924. From 1882 to 1885 he worked as an assistant at the institute for pathology and anatomy. He also resided with the mycologist Oscar Brefeld in Münster. He graduated from the medical studies in 1888, and worked some years as a physician in Kristiania. In 1893 he delivered his doctoral thesis, Om sop paa levende jordbund. From 1887 to 1890 he managed the physiological laboratories at the brewer Ringnes in Oslo. He also managed a factory at Toten, which produced condensed milk.

In 1888 he discovered a method to produce condensed milk without sugar. He designed the items required for production, and is credited for being the founder of industrial milk conservation in Norway. The product "Viking Milk" was patented and introduced by him in 1891. The factory at Toten was taken over by the Swiss company Henri Nestlé in 1897, while Sopp continued as technical and scientific manager until he retired in 1925.

Sopp was the first to suggest classifying fungi as belonging to neither plantae nor animalia, but to a third kingdom, already in his thesis Om sop paa levende jordbund from 1893, and in a subsequent article in the periodical Nyt Tidsskrift.

He was decorated as a Knight of the Royal Norwegian Order of St. Olav in 1900.

== Botanist abbreviation ==
Because he changed his name during his career in botany, Sopp has two Brummitt & Powell author abbreviations:
