= CWP1 =

Gene

Cell wall protein CWP1

Identifiers
- Organism: Saccharomyces cerevisiae
- Symbol: CWP1
- Entrez: 853766
- Orthologs: NCBI: entry; OMA: entry
- RefSeq (mRNA): NM_001179662.1
- RefSeq (Prot): NP_012827.1
- UniProt: P28319

Other data
- Chromosome: XI: 0.26 - 0.26 Mb
Search for
- Structures: Swiss-model
- Domains: InterPro

Cell Wall Protein 1 (CWP1) is a gene of Saccharomyces cerevisiae and the Saccharomyces cerevisiae-Saccharomyces bayanus hybrid, Saccharomyces pastorianus. It is closely related to the CWP2 gene and produces a small protein associated with the budding scar, known as cwp1p.
