= Yeast in winemaking =

Yeasts used for alcoholic fermentation of wine

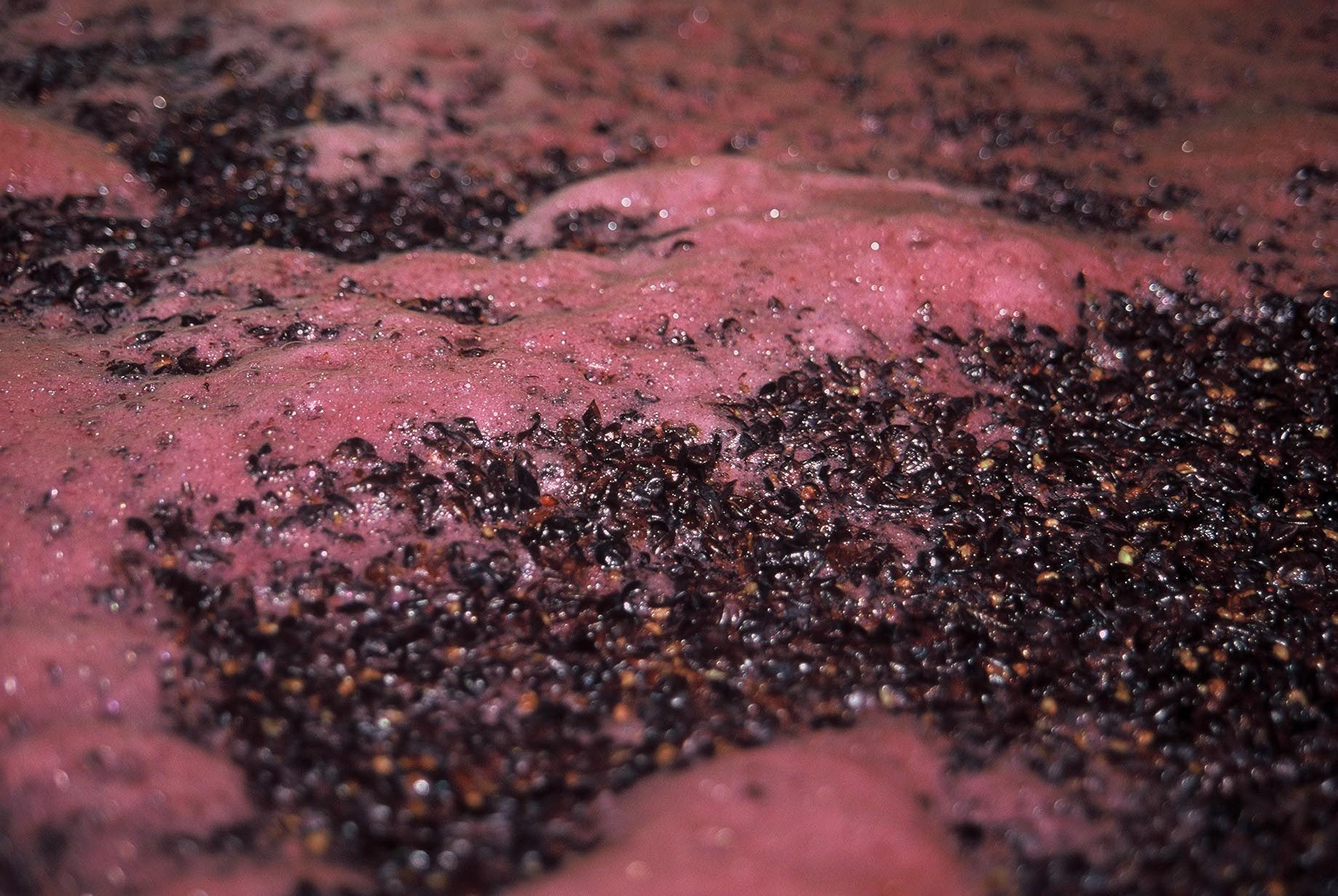
The process of fermentation at work on Pinot noir. As yeast consume the sugar in the must it releases alcohol and carbon dioxide (seen here as the foaming bubbles) as byproducts.

The role of yeast in winemaking is the most important element that distinguishes wine from fruit juice. In the absence of oxygen, yeast converts the sugars of the fruit into alcohol and carbon dioxide through the process of fermentation. The more sugars in the grapes, the higher the potential alcohol level of the wine if the yeast are allowed to carry out fermentation to dryness. Sometimes winemakers will stop fermentation early in order to leave some residual sugars and sweetness in the wine such as with dessert wines. This can be achieved by dropping fermentation temperatures to the point where the yeast are inactive, sterile filtering the wine to remove the yeast or fortification with brandy or neutral spirits to kill off the yeast cells. If fermentation is unintentionally stopped, such as when the yeasts become exhausted of available nutrients and the wine has not yet reached dryness, this is considered a stuck fermentation.

The most common yeast associated with winemaking is Saccharomyces cerevisiae which has been favored due to its predictable and vigorous fermentation capabilities, tolerance of relatively high levels of alcohol and sulfur dioxide as well as its ability to thrive in normal wine pH between 2.8 and 4. Despite its widespread use which often includes deliberate inoculation from cultured stock, S. cerevisiae is rarely the only yeast species involved in a fermentation. Grapes brought in from harvest are usually teeming with a variety of "wild yeast" from the Kloeckera and Candida genera. These yeasts often begin the fermentation process almost as soon as the grapes are picked when the weight of the clusters in the harvest bins begin to crush the grapes, releasing the sugar-rich must. While additions of sulfur dioxide (often added at the crusher) may limit some of the wild yeast activities, these yeasts will usually die out once the alcohol level reaches about 15% due to the toxicity of alcohol on the yeast cells physiology while the more alcohol tolerant Saccharomyces species take over. In addition to S. cerevisiae, Saccharomyces bayanus is a species of yeast that can tolerate alcohol levels of 17–20% and is often used in fortified wine production such as ports and varieties such as Zinfandel and Syrah harvested at high Brix sugar levels. Another common yeast involved in wine production is Brettanomyces whose presence in a wine may be viewed by different winemakers as either a wine fault or in limited quantities as an added note of complexity.

== History ==
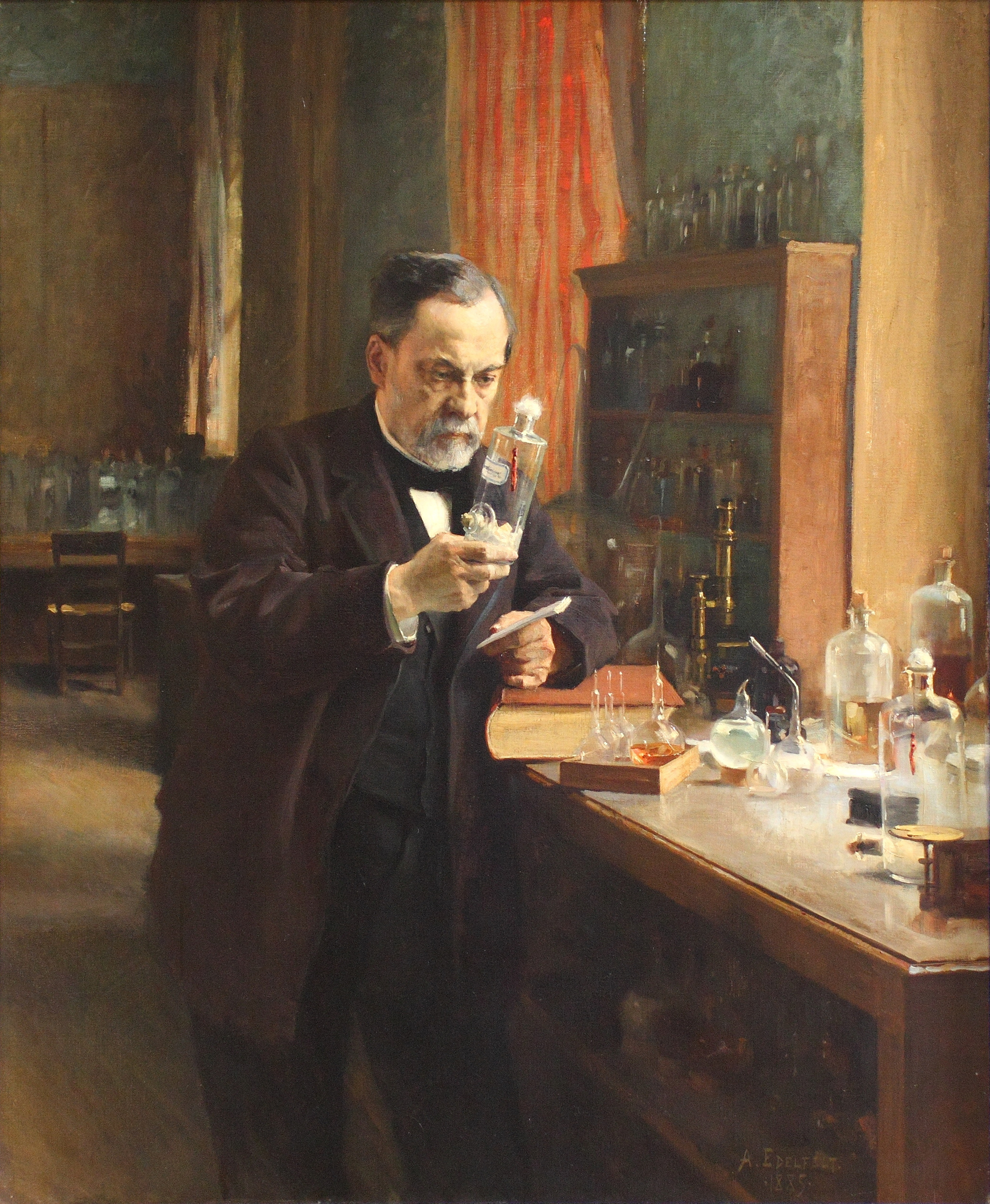
French scientist Louis Pasteur discovered the connection between microscopic yeast and the process of fermentation.

For most of the history of wine, winemakers did not know the mechanism that somehow converted sugary grape juice into alcoholic wine. They could observe the fermentation process which was often described as "boiling", "seething" or the wine being "troubled" due to release of carbon dioxide that gave the wine a frothy, bubbling appearance. This history is preserved in the etymology of the word "yeast" itself which essentially means "to boil".

In the mid-19th century, the French scientist Louis Pasteur was tasked by the French government to study what made some wines spoil. His work, which would later lead to Pasteur being considered one of the "Fathers of Microbiology", would uncover the connection between microscopic yeast cells and the process of the fermentation. It was Pasteur who discovered that yeast converted sugars in the must into alcohol and carbon dioxide, though the exact mechanisms of how the yeast would accomplish this task was not discovered till the 20th century with the Embden–Meyerhof–Parnas pathway.

The yeast species commonly known as Saccharomyces cerevisiae was first identified in late 19th century enology text as Saccharomyces ellipsoideus due to the elliptical (as opposed to circular) shape of the cells. Throughout the 20th century, more than 700 different strains of Saccharomyces cerevisiae were identified. The differences between the vast majority of these strains are mostly minor, though individual winemakers will develop a preference for particular strains when making certain wines or working with particular grape varieties. Some of these differences include the "vigor" or speed of fermentation, temperature tolerance, the production of volatile sulfur compounds (such as hydrogen sulfide) and other compounds that may influence the aroma of the wine.

In modern winemaking, winemakers have the option to select from a diverse range of yeast strains, each offering distinct characteristics that influence the wine's sensory profile. These strains are readily available for purchase from specialized suppliers. Winemakers can now easily access yeast strains that accentuate desirable features in wine, such as aromatic compounds, mouthfeel, and fermentation kinetics. This commercial availability of yeast strains has revolutionized the art of winemaking by allowing for more precise control over the fermentation process and the resultant wine's character.

== Role in winemaking ==
In the absence of oxygen, yeast cells will take the pyruvate produced by glycolysis and reduce it into acetaldehyde which is further reduced into ethanol "recharging" the NAD+ co-enzymes that is needed for various metabolic processes of the yeast.

The primary role of yeast is to convert the sugars present (namely glucose) in the grape must into alcohol. The yeast accomplishes this by utilizing glucose through a series of metabolic pathways that, in the presence of oxygen, produces not only large amounts of energy for the cell but also many different intermediates that the cell needs to function. In the absence of oxygen (and sometimes even in the presence of oxygen), the cell will continue some metabolic functions (such as glycolysis) but will rely on other pathways such as reduction of acetaldehyde into ethanol (fermentation) to "recharge" the co-enzymes needed to keep metabolism going. It is through this process of fermentation that ethanol is released by the yeast cells as a waste product. Eventually, if the yeast cells are healthy and fermentation is allowed to run to the completion, all fermentable sugars will be used up by the yeast with only the unfermentable pentose leaving behind a negligible amount of residual sugar.

=== Other compounds in wine produced by yeast ===
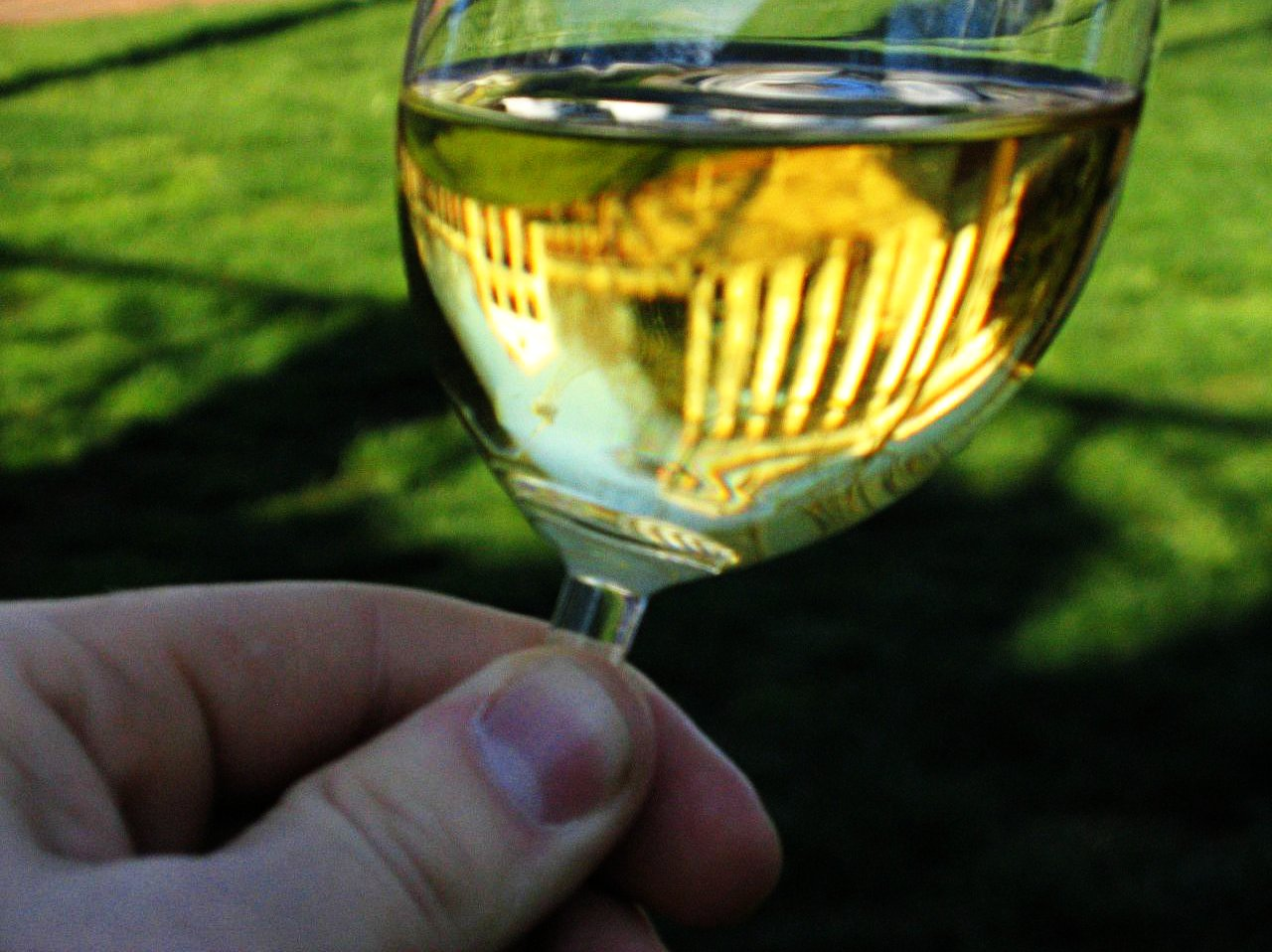
If a Chardonnay has too much "buttery" diacetyl notes, winemakers may add fresh yeast to the wine to consume the diacetyl and reduce it to the more neutral-smelling fusel oil 2,3-butanediol.

While the production of alcohol is the most noteworthy by-product of yeast metabolism from a winemaking perspective, there are a number of other products that yeast produce that can be also influence the resulting wine. This includes glycerol which is produced when an intermediate of the glycolysis cycle (dihydroxyacetone) is reduced to "recharge" the NADH enzyme needed to continue other metabolic activities. This is usually produced early in the fermentation process before the mechanisms to reduce acetaldehyde into ethanol to recharge NADH becomes the cell's primary means of maintaining redox balance. As glycerol contributes increased body and a slightly sweet taste without increasing the alcohol level of the wine, some winemakers try to intentionally favor conditions that would promote glycerol production in wine. This includes selecting yeast strains that favor glycerol production (or allowing some wild yeast like Kloeckera and Metschnikowia to ferment), increased oxygen exposure and aeration as well as fermenting at higher temperatures. Glycerol production is also encouraged if most available acetaldehyde is made unavailable by binding with bisulfite molecules in the wine, but it would take a substantial amount of sulfur dioxide addition (far beyond legal limits) to prolong glycerol production beyond just these very nascent stages of fermentation.

Other by-products of yeast include:

- Methanol – Caused by the demethylation of pectins in the must by enzymes of the yeast. More commonly found in red wines than white but only in very small amounts between 20 and 200 mg/L.
- Fusel oils – Formed by the decomposition of amino acids by the yeast. This includes 2,3-butanediol which is formed by yeast that are consuming diacetyl, the compound that gives Chardonnay and other wines a "buttery" aroma, reducing it first to acetoin and then to the more neutral-smelling 2,3-butanediol. Many beer and winemakers who have a wine with too much "butteriness" will often "pitch" fresh yeast cultures into the no longer fermenting tank so that the yeast will consume the diacetyl and reduce the aroma.
- Succinic acid – Like glycerol, this is often formed early in fermentation. Usually found in concentrations of 500–1200 mg/L, it is a minor acid in the overall acidity of wine.
- Acetic acid – Considered a main component of volatile acidity that can make a wine taste unbalanced and overly acidic. While acetic acid is the main volatile acid produced by yeast, trace amounts of butyric, formic and propionic acids can also be formed depending on the yeast strain. Most countries have wine laws setting the legal limit of volatile acidity, usually expressed as acetic acid, to 1200–2000 mg/L. Acetic acid can also lead to the development of the wine fault ethyl acetate which is characterized by a "nail polish remover" smell. However, small amounts of acetic acid are actually beneficial for the yeast as they use them to synthesis lipids in the cell membrane.

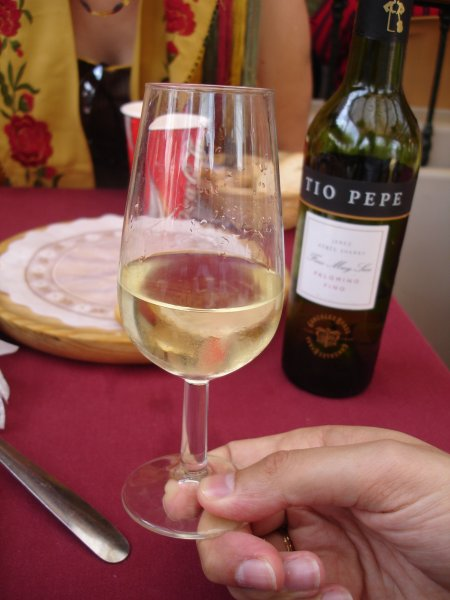
The distinctive "aldehydic" notes of Sherry wines are caused by special yeast native to the Jerez wine region.

- Acetaldehyde – While most of the acetaldehyde produce gets reduced to ethanol or is bound by sulfur dioxide, concentrations between 50 and 100 mg/L can remain in the wine. The flor yeast strains that produce the Spanish wine Sherry will produce higher amounts that contributes to the characterized "aldehydic" aromas of Sherries. In the presence of oxygen, yeast can convert some of the ethanol presence in the wine back into acetaldehyde creating oxidized aromas.
- Hydrogen sulfide – Often produced by yeast during fermentation because of a nitrogen deficiency in the must. This can be done by a reduction of sulfates or sulfites available in the must or by the decomposition of dead yeast cells by other yeast that releases sulfur-containing amino acids that are further broken down by the yeast. The latter often happens with wines that sit in contact with their lees for long periods of time between rackings. In the presence of alcohol, hydrogen sulfide can react with ethanol to form ethyl mercaptans and disulfides that contribute to off aromas and wine faults. Some commercial yeast strains, such as Montrachet 522 are known to produce higher levels of hydrogen sulfides than other strains, particularly if the must has some nutrient deficiencies.
- Pyruvic acid – Along with acetaldehyde, this compound can react with anthocyanins extracted from contact with grape skins to create a more stable color pigment (pyranoanthocyanin) that can enhance the color of some red wines.
- Various esters, ketones, lactones, phenols and acetals.

=== Lees ===
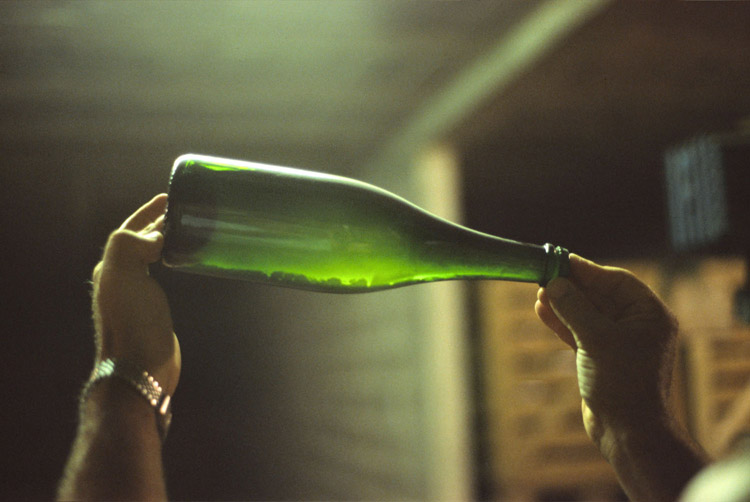
The lees left over from the secondary fermentation of sparkling wine can be seen on the bottom side of this bottle being inspected. Eventually this wine will go through riddling to collect the lees in the neck, where it will be removed prior to corking.

When yeast cells die, they sink to the bottom of the fermentation vessel where they combine with insoluble tartrates, grape seeds, skin and pulp fragments to form the lees. During fermentation, the first significant racking which removes the bulk of dead yeast cells is often referred to as the gross lees as opposed to the less coarse fine lees that come as the wine continues to settle and age. During the time that the wine spends in contact with the lees, a number of changes can impact the wine due to both the autolysis (or self-metabolize) of the dead yeast cells as well as the reductive conditions that can develop if the lees are not aerated or stirred (a process that the French call bâtonnage). The length of time that a wine spends on its lees (called sur lie) will depend on the winemaking style and type of wine.

The process of leaving the wine to spend some contact with the lees has a long history in winemaking, being known to the Ancient Romans and described by Cato the Elder in the 2nd century BC. Today the practice is widely associated with any red wines that are barrel fermented, Muscadet, sparkling wine Champagne as well as Chardonnay produced in many wine regions across the globe. Typically when wines are left in contact with their lees, they are regularly stirred in order to release the mannoproteins, polysaccharides and other compounds that were present in the yeast cell walls and membranes. This stirring also helps avoid the development of reductive sulfur compounds like mercaptans and hydrogen sulfide that can appear if the lees layer is more than 10 cm (3.9 in) thick and undisturbed for more than a week.

Most of the benefits associated with lees contact deals with the influence on the wine of the mannoproteins released during the autolysis of the yeast cells. Composed primarily of mannose and proteins, with some glucose, mannoproteins are often bound in the cell wall of yeast with hydrophobic aroma compounds that become volatilized as the cell wall breaks down. Not only does the release of mannoproteins impart sensory changes in the wine but they can contribute to tartrate and protein stability, help enhance the body and mouthfeel of the wine as well as decrease the perception of bitterness and astringency of tannins.

=== Secondary fermentation ===
The production of Champagne and many sparkling wines requires a second fermentation to occur in the bottle in order to produce the carbonation necessary for the style. A small amount of sugared liquid is added to individual bottles, and the yeast is allowed to convert this to more alcohol and carbon dioxide. The lees are then ricked into the neck of the bottle, frozen, and expelled via pressure of the carbonated wine.

== Types of yeasts used in winemaking ==
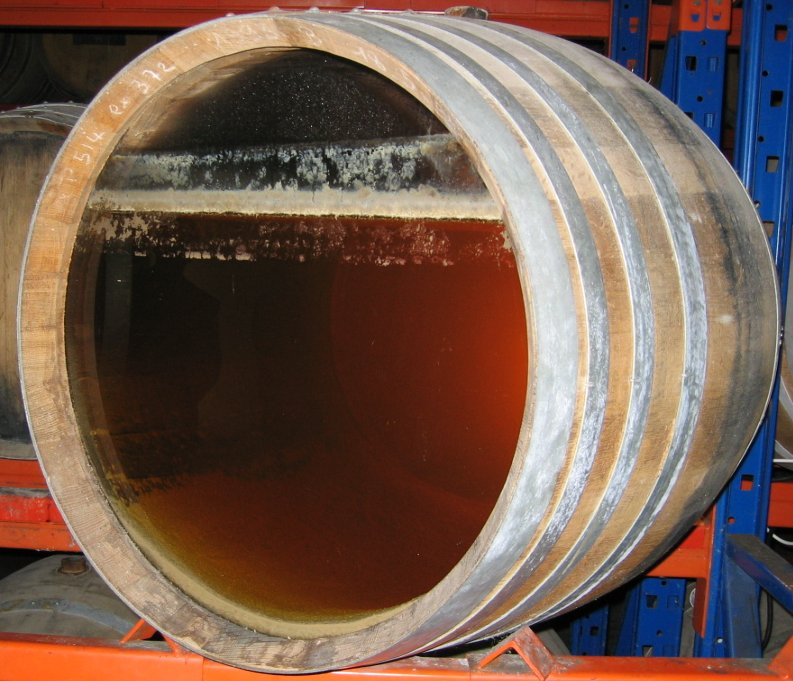
Film yeast on the surface of wine in a barrel of Vin jaune from the Jura wine region of France

Yeast taxonomy includes classification of yeast species depending on the presence or absence of a sexual phase. Therefore, some winemaking yeasts are classified by their asexual anamorph (or "imperfect" form) while others may be classified by their sexual teleomorph (or "perfect" form). A common example of this is Brettanomyces (or "Brett") that is usually referenced in wine and viticulture text under its asexual classification though some scientific and winemaking texts may describe specific species (such as Dekkera bruxellensis) under its sporulating sexual classification of Dekkera. Unless otherwise noted, this article will commonly refer to the asexual form of wine yeast.

The most common yeast generally associated with winemaking is Saccharomyces cerevisiae which is also used in bread making and brewing. Other genera of yeast that can be involved in winemaking (either beneficially or as the cause of potential wine faults) include:

- Brettanomyces (Teleomorph Dekkera)
- Candida (Teleomorphs for different species from several genera including Pichia, Metschnikowia, Issatchenkia, Torulaspora and Kluyveromyces)
- Kloeckera (Teleomorph Hanseniaspora), usually the most common "wild yeast" found in the vineyard. Some species are known as "killer yeast" that produce inhibitory levels of ethyl acetate and acetic acid that can kill off sensitive strains of Saccharomyces cerevisiae
- Saccharomycodes
- Schizosaccharomyces, the only wine yeast that reproduced by fission whereas most wine yeast reproduce by budding.
- Zygosaccharomyces, very alcohol-tolerant and can grow in wines up to 18% v/v. Additionally this yeast can survive in extremely high sugar levels (as much as 60% w/w or 60 Brix) and is very resistant to sulfur dioxide.
- Aureobasidium, particularly the "black yeast" species of Aureobasidium pullulans found in moist cellars that can contaminate aging wine in barrels.

=== Saccharomyces ===
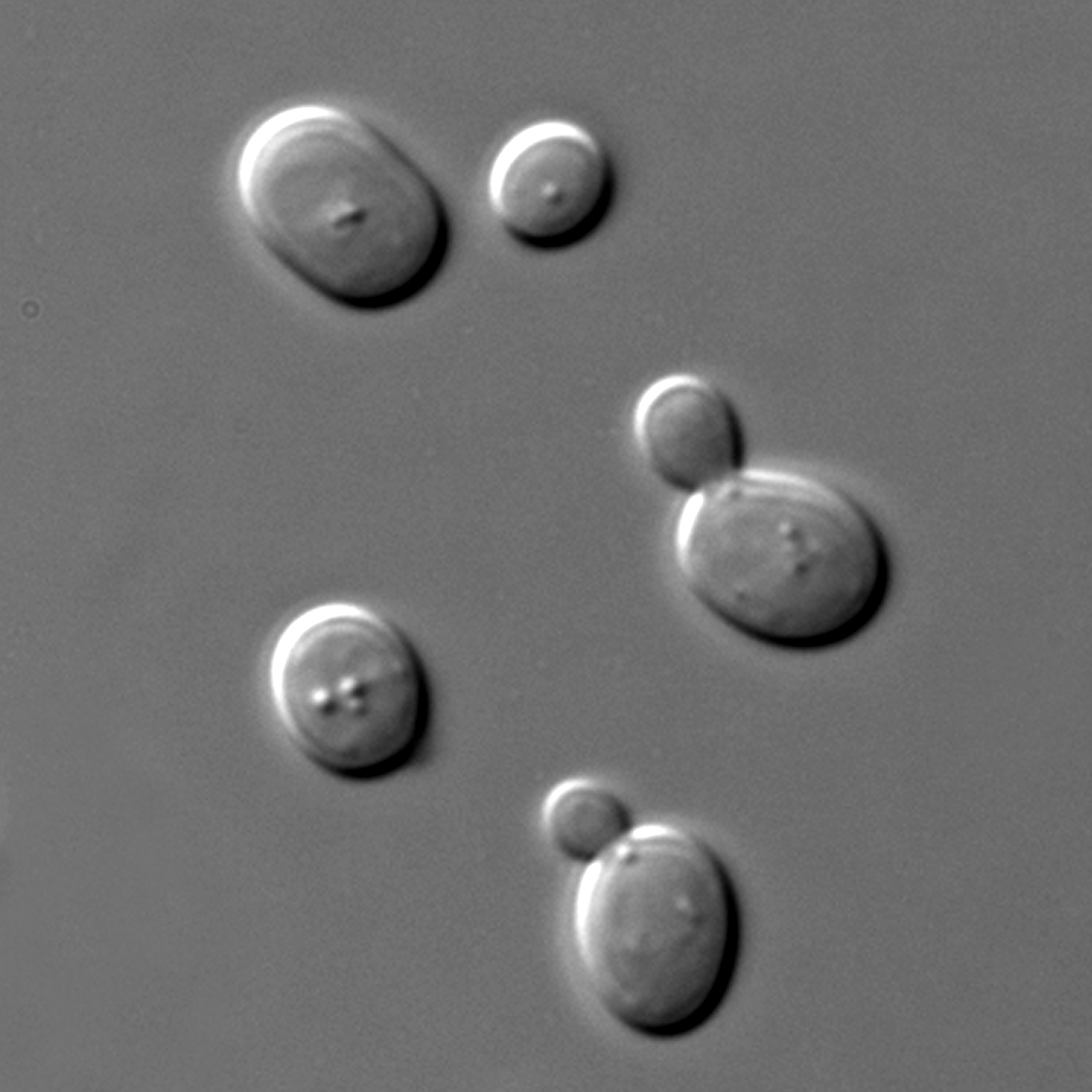
Saccharomyces cerevisiae as seen under a Differential Interference Contrast (DIC) microscope

The yeast genus Saccharomyces (sugar mold) is favored for winemaking (for both grapes as well as other fruit wines in addition to being used in brewing and breadmaking) because of the generally reliable and positive attributes it can bring to the wine. These yeasts will usually readily ferment glucose, sucrose and raffinose and metabolize glucose, sucrose, raffinose, maltose and ethanol. However, Saccharomyces cannot ferment or utilize pentoses (such as arabinose) which is usually present in small amount in wines as residual sugars.

In addition to Saccharomyces cerevisiae, other species within the genus Saccharomyces that are involved with winemaking include:

- Saccharomyces bayanus
- Saccharomyces beticus
- Saccharomyces fermentati
- Saccharomyces paradoxus
- Saccharomyces pastorianus
- Saccharomyces uvarum

=== Influences of different strains on fermentation ===
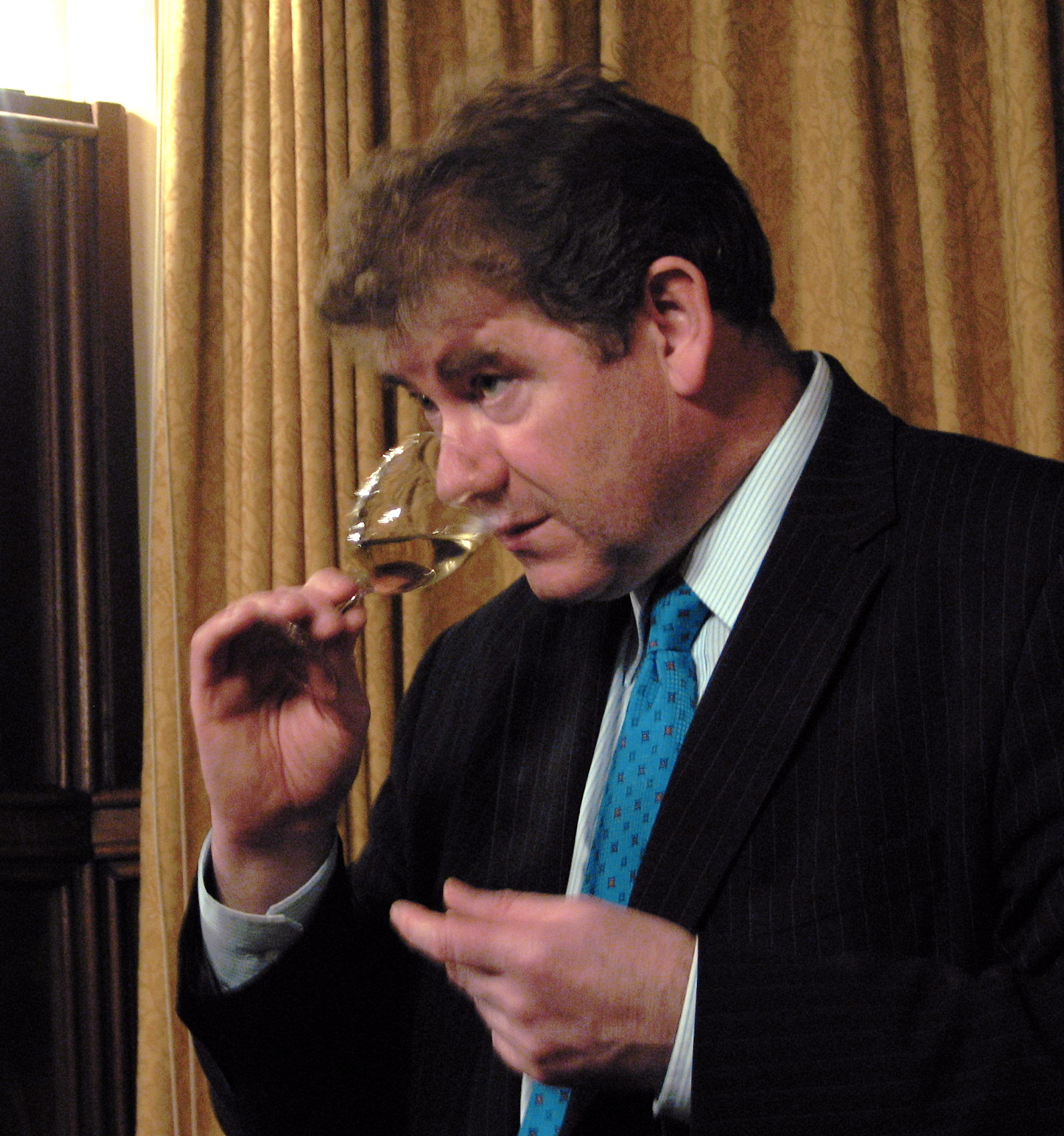
While some strains of yeast may influence the sensory characteristics and aromas of young wine, these differences seem to fade as the wine ages.

In 1996, Saccharomyces cerevisiae was the first single-celled, eukaryotic organism to have its entire genome sequenced. This sequencing helped confirm the nearly century of work by mycologists and enologists in identifying different strains of Saccharomyces cerevisiae that are used in beer, bread and winemaking. Today there are several hundred different strains of S. cerevisiae identified. Not all of the strains are suitable for winemaking and even among the strains that are, there is debate among winemakers and scientists about the actual magnitude of differences between the various strains and their potential impact on the wine. Even among strains that have demonstrated distinctive difference when compared among young wines, these differences seem to fade and become less distinctive as the wines age.

Some distinct difference among various strains include the production of certain "off-flavor" and aromas that may be temporary (but producing a "stinky fermentation") or could stay with the wine and either have to be dealt with through other winemaking means (such as the presence of volatile sulfur compounds like hydrogen sulfide) or leave a faulty wine. Another difference includes the "vigor" or speed of fermentation (which can also be influenced by other factors beyond yeast selection) with some yeast strains having the tendency to do "fast ferments" while others may take longer to get going.

Another less measurable difference that are subject to more debate and questions of winemakers preference is the influence of strain selection on the varietal flavors of certainly grape varieties such as Sauvignon blanc and Sémillon. It is believed that these wines can be influenced by thiols produced by the hydrolysis of certain cysteine-linked compounds by enzymes that are more prevalent in particular strains. Other aromatic varieties such as Gewürztraminer, Riesling and Muscat may also be influenced by yeast strains containing high levels of glycosidases enzymes that can modify monoterpenes. Similarly, though potentially to a much smaller extent, other varieties could be influenced by hydrolytic enzymes working on aliphatics, norisoprenoids, and benzene derivatives such as polyphenols in the must.

In sparkling wine production some winemakers select strains (such as one known as Épernay named after the town in the Champagne wine region of France and California Champagne, also known as UC-Davis strain 505) that are known to flocculate well, allowing the dead yeast cells to be removed easily by riddling and disgorgement. In Sherry production, the surface film of yeast known as flor used to make the distinctive style of fino and manzanilla sherries comes from different strains of Saccharomyces cerevisiae, though the commercial flor yeast available for inoculation is often from different species of Saccharomyces, Saccharomyces beticus, Saccharomyces fermentati and Saccharomyces bayanus.

== Wild yeasts and natural fermentation ==
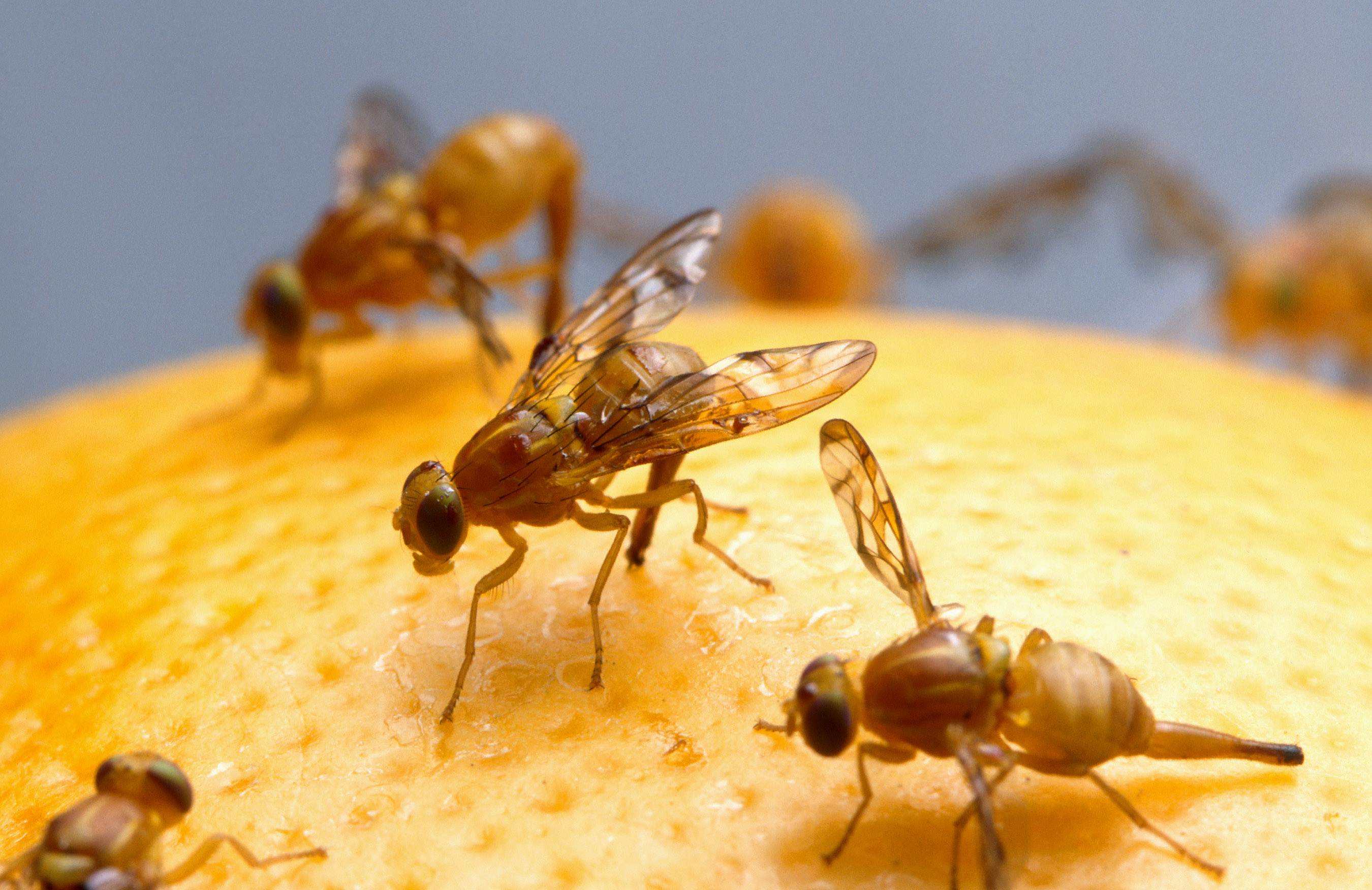
Fruit flies are a common vector that transports ambient or "wild" yeast strains within wineries.

In winemaking, the term "wild yeast" has multiple meanings. In its most basic context, it refers to yeast that has not been introduced to the must by intentional inoculation of a cultured strain. Instead, these "wild yeasts" often come into contact with the must through their presence on harvest equipment, transport bins, the surface winemaking equipment and as part of the natural flora of a winery. Very often these are strains of Saccharomyces cerevisiae that have taken residence in these places over the years, sometimes being previously introduced by inoculation of prior vintages. In this context, these wild yeasts are often referred to as ambient, indigenous or natural yeast as opposed to inoculated, selected or cultured yeast. Wineries that often solely rely on these "in-house" strains will sometimes market their wines as being the product of wild or natural fermentations. The (c. 304) Nanfang Caomu Zhuang has the earliest description of winemaking using "herb ferment" (cǎoqū 草麴) wild yeast with rice and various herbs, including the poisonous Gelsemium elegans (yěgé 冶葛).

Another use of the term "wild yeast" refers to the non-Saccharomyces genera of yeasts that are present in the vineyard, on the surface of grapevines and of the grapes themselves. Anywhere from 160 to 100,000 colony forming units of wild yeasts per berry could exist in a typical vineyard. These yeasts can be carried by air currents, birds and insects through the vineyard and even into the winery (such as by fruit flies). The most common wild yeasts found in the vineyard are from the genera Kloeckera, Candida and Pichia with the species Kloeckera apiculata being the most dominant species by far. Saccharomyces cerevisiae, itself, is actually quite rarely found in the vineyard or on the surface freshly harvested wine grapes unless the winery frequently reintroduced winery waste (such as lees and pomace) into the vineyard.

Recent research has shown how climate change is starting to affect yeast behavior during fermentation. Due to rising temperatures, grapes are arriving at wineries with higher sugar levels. This puts more stress on yeast and increases the risk of stuck fermentations. Because of this, winemakers are starting to pay closer attention to what yeast they choose for fermentation more than ever before. Mixed fermentations, which use non-Saccharomyces yeasts alongside Saccharomyces cerevisiae, are also becoming increasingly popular to help enhance wine complexity and reduce volatile acidity.

Unlike the "ambient" Saccharomyces wild yeast, these genera of wild yeasts have very low tolerance to both alcohol and sulfur dioxide. They are capable of starting a fermentation and often begin this process as early as the harvest bin when clusters of grapes get slightly crushed under their own weight. Some winemakers will try to "knock out" these yeasts with doses of sulfur dioxide, most often at the crusher before the grapes are pressed or allowed to macerate with skin contact. Other winemakers may allow the wild yeasts to continue fermenting until they succumb to the toxicity of the alcohol they produce which is often between 3–5% alcohol by volume and then letting either inoculated or "ambient" Saccharomyces strains finish the fermentation.

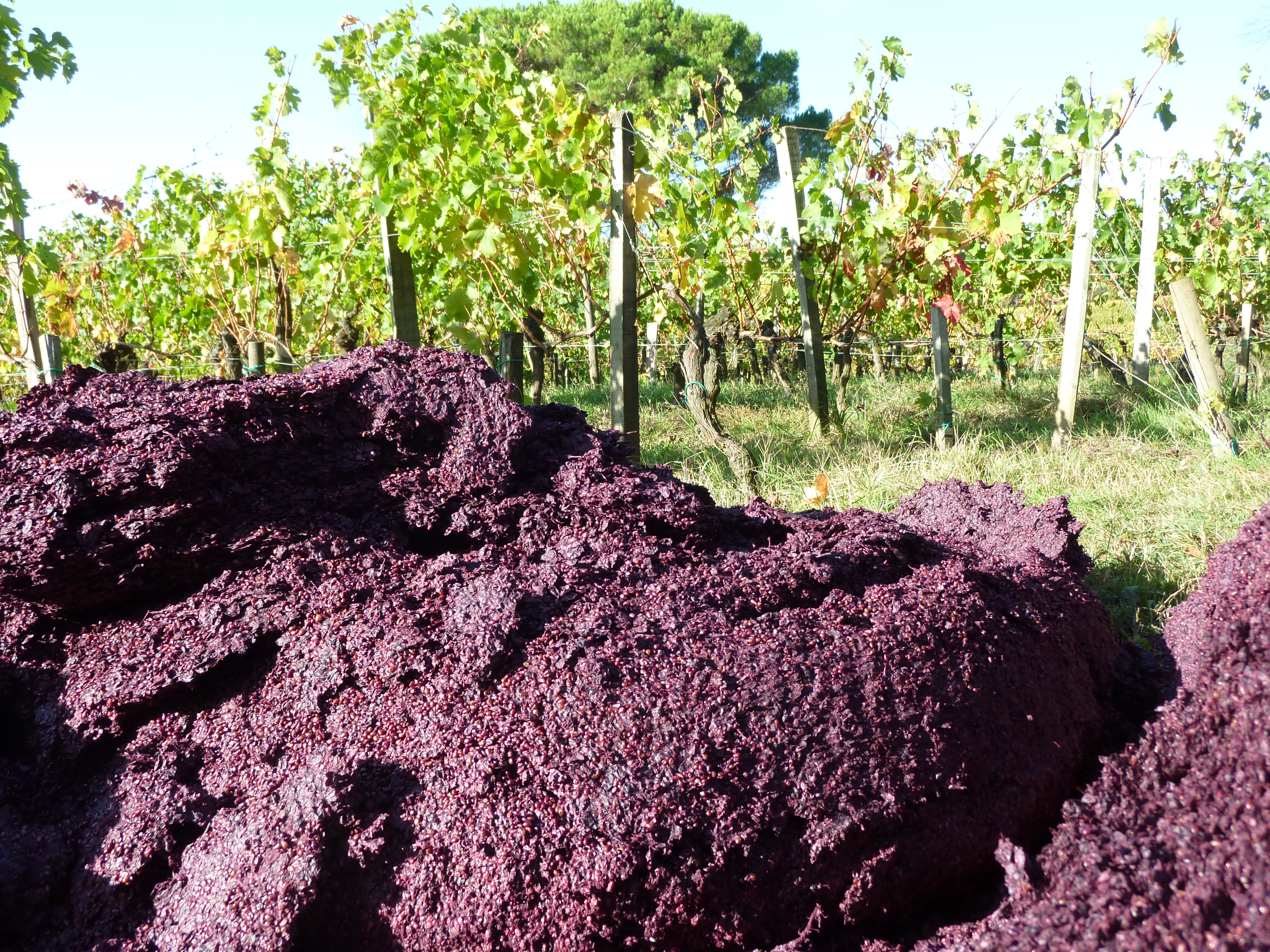
Wineries that wish to cultivate an "in-house" ambient yeast strain will often recycle the leftover pomace of previous vintages as compost in the vineyard.

The use of both "ambient" and non-Saccharomyces wild yeasts carries both potential benefits and risk. Some winemakers feel that the use of resident/indigenous yeast helps contribute to the unique expression of terroir in the wine. In wine regions such as Bordeaux, classified and highly regarded estates will often tout the quality of their resident "chateau" strains. To this extent, wineries will often take the leftover pomace and lees from winemaking and return them to the vineyard to be used as compost in order to encourage the sustained presence of favorable strains. But compared to inoculated yeast, these ambient yeasts hold the risk of having a more unpredictable fermentation. Not only could this unpredictability include the presence of off-flavors/aromas and higher volatile acidity but also the potential for a stuck fermentation if the indigenous yeast strains are not vigorous enough to fully convert all the sugars.

It is virtually inevitable that non-Saccharomyces wild yeast will have a role in beginning the fermentation of virtually every wine but for the wineries that choose to allow these yeasts to continue fermenting versus minimizing their influence do so with the intent of enhancing complexity through bio-diversity. While these non-Saccharomyces ferment glucose and fructose into alcohol, they also have the potential to create other intermediates that could influence the aroma and flavor profile of the wine. Some of these intermediates could be positive, such as phenylethanol, which can impart a rose-like aroma. However, as with ambient yeasts, the products of these yeasts can be very unpredictable – especially in terms of the types of flavors and aromas that these yeasts can produce.. That is why many studies are currently being conducted on the behavior of non-Saccharomyces yeasts and their co-inoculation in wine. This makes it possible to take advantage of the benefits of these yeasts, such as L. thermotolerans, M. pulcherrima, H. vineae, and T. delbrueckii... and to produce metabolites of interest for the production of unique wines, such as higher levels of lactic acid (Lt), large quantities of terpenes, thiols, and esters, such as ethyl octanoate (Mp), higher levels of 2-phenylethyl acetate and benzenoids (Hv), and lower volatile acidity and greater texture/body (Td).

== Inoculated yeast ==
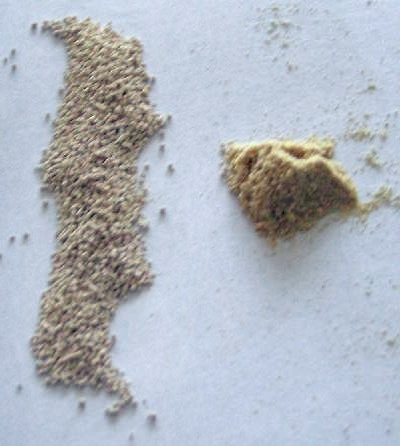
Some winemakers favor the use of freeze-dried cultured yeast (left) and yeast nutrients (right) because of their relative predictability in beginning and completing a fermentation.

When winemakers select a cultured yeast strain, it is largely done because the winemaker wants a predictable fermentation taken to completion by a strain that has a track record of dependability. Among the particular considerations that are often important to winemakers is a yeast's tendency to:

- Quickly begin fermentation, out-competing other "wild yeasts" for nutrients in the must
- Completely utilize all fermentable sugars with a predictable sugar-to-alcohol conversion rate
- Have an alcohol-tolerance up to 15% or even higher depending on the winemaking style
- Have a high sulfur dioxide tolerance but low production of sulfur compounds such as hydrogen sulfide or dimethyl sulfide
- Produce a minimum amount of residual pyruvate, acetic acid and acetaldehyde
- Produce minimum foaming during fermentation which may create difficulties for cap management during maceration or cause bungs to pop out during barrel fermentation.
- Have high levels of flocculation and lees compaction that makes racking, fining and filtering of the wine easier.

Inoculated (or pure cultured) yeasts are strains of Saccharomyces cerevisiae that have been identified and plated from wineries across the world (including notable producers from well-known wine regions such as Bordeaux, Burgundy, Napa Valley and the Barossa Valley). These strains are tested in laboratories to determine a strain's vigor, sulfur dioxide and alcohol tolerance, production levels of acetic acid and sulfur compounds, ability to re-ferment (positive for sparkling wine but a negative attribute for sweet late-harvest wines), development of surface film on the wine (positive for some Sherry styles but a negative attribute for many other wines), enhancement of a wine's color or certain varietal characteristics by enzymes in the yeast cells and other metabolic products produced by the yeast, foaming and flocculation tendencies, yeasticidal properties (a trait known as "Killer yeast") and tolerance for nutritional deficiencies in a must that may lead to a stuck fermentation.

=== Re-hydrating freeze dried yeast cultures ===
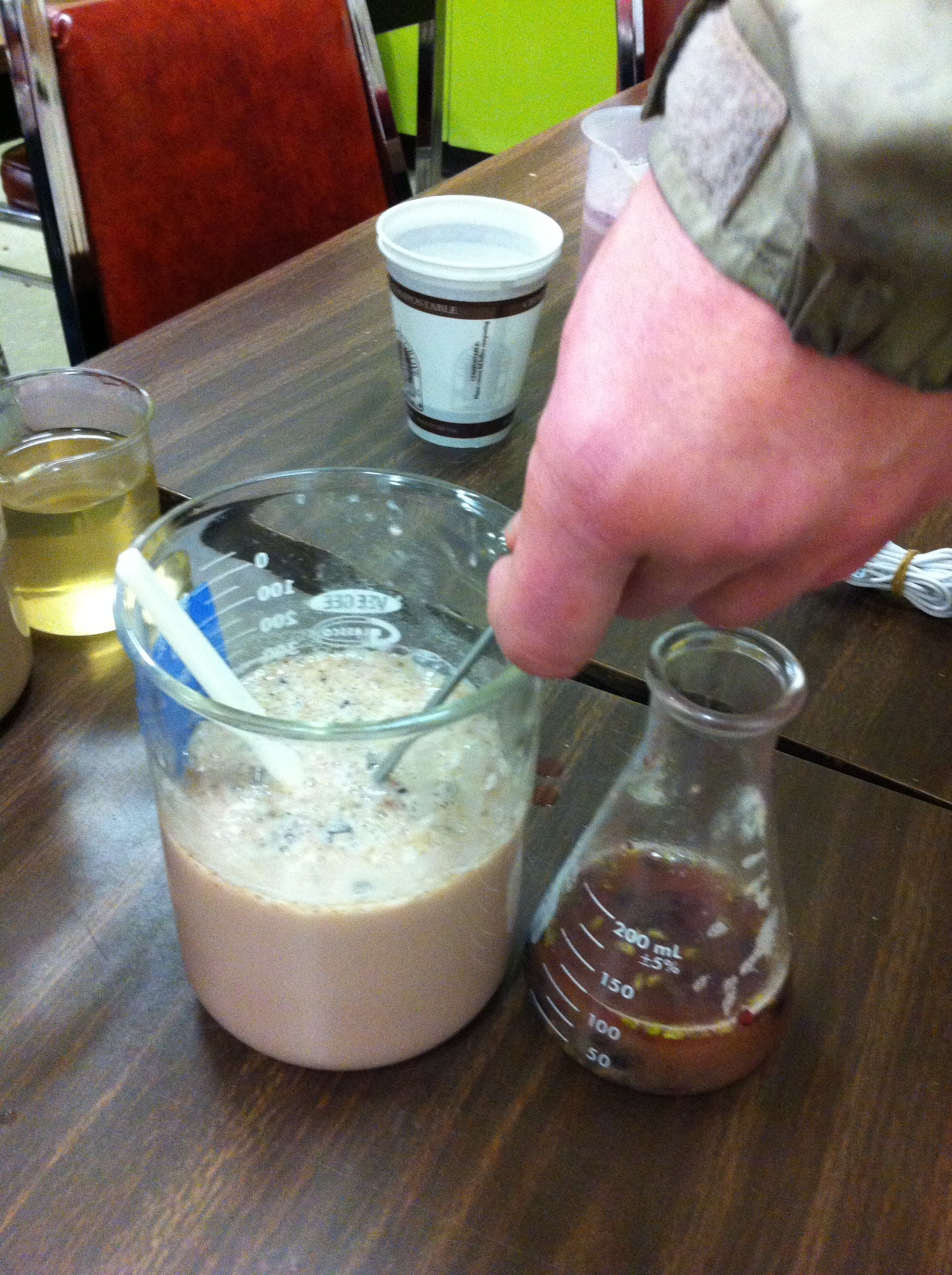
Preparing a yeast starter culture and gradually cooling the culture down to the must temperature by adding some wine

Pure culture yeasts that are grown in a lab are often freeze dried and packaged for commercial use. Prior to their addition into must, these yeasts need to be re-hydrated in "starter cultures" that must be carefully monitored (particularly in regards to temperature) to ensure that the yeast cells are not killed off by cold shock. Ideally winemakers want to add enough inoculum to have a viable cell population density of 5 million cells per milliliter. The exact amount of freeze-dried culture varies by manufacturer and strain of yeast but it is often around 1 gram per gallon (or 25 grams per 100 liters). Wines that could have potentially problematic fermentation (such as high sugar level late harvest or botryized wines) may have more yeast added.

Similarly, re-hydration procedures will also vary depending on the manufacturer and winery. Yeast is often inoculated in a volume of water or grape must that is 5–10 times the weight of the dry yeast. This liquid is often brought to temperature of 40 °C (104 °F) prior to the introduction of the yeast (though some yeast strains may need temperatures below 38 °C (100 °F)) to allow the cells to disperse easily rather than clump and sink to the bottom of the container. The heat activation also allows the cells to quickly reestablish their membrane barrier before soluble cytoplasmic components escape the cell. Re-hydration at lower temperatures can greatly reduce the viability of the yeast with up to 60% cell death if the yeast is re-hydrated at 15 °C (59 °F). The culture is then stirred and aerated to incorporate oxygen into the culture which the yeast uses in the synthesis of needed survival factors.

The temperature of the starter culture is then slowly reduced, often by the graduated addition of must to get within 5–10 °C (41–50 °F) of the must that the culture will be added to. This is done to avoid the sudden cold shock that the yeast cells may experience if the starter culture was added directly to the must itself which can kill up to 60% of the culture. Additionally, surviving cells exposed to cold shock tend to see an increase in hydrogen sulfide production.

== Nutritional needs of wine yeast ==
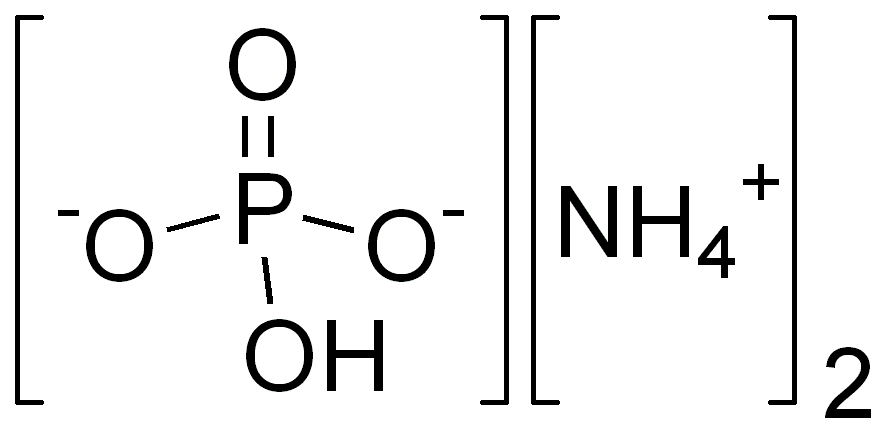
Diammonium phosphate (or DAP) is a common additive that provides two necessary nutrients for yeast to have a healthy and sustained fermentation – nitrogen and phosphate.

In order to successfully complete a fermentation with minimum to no negative attributes being added to the wine, yeast needs to have the full assortment of its nutritional needs met. These include not only an available energy source (carbon in the form of sugars such as glucose) and yeast assimilable nitrogen (ammonia and amino acids or YAN) but also minerals (such as magnesium) and vitamins (such as thiamin and riboflavin) that serve as important growth and survival factors. Among the other nutritional needs of wine yeast:

- Phosphate – used for the production of nucleic acids, phospholipids (an important component of the cell membrane) and ATP (Adenosine triphosphate which the cell uses for transferring energy for metabolism).
- Potassium – important for the uptake and utilization of phosphate
- Biotin – involved in the synthesis of proteins, fatty acids and nucleic acids.
- Pantothenic acid – involved in the metabolism of sugars and lipids. A deficiency of this vitamin could lead into increase hydrogen sulfide production with off-aromas in the resulting wine.
- Nicotinic acid – involved in the synthesis of Nicotinamide adenine dinucleotide (NAD+), a co-enzyme that is important in maintaining the redox balance of the cell as well as in the process of ethanol fermentation itself.
- Inositol – involved with the secondary messenger molecules that facilitate cell division.
- Trace amounts of calcium, chlorine, copper, iron, manganese and zinc for healthy cell function.

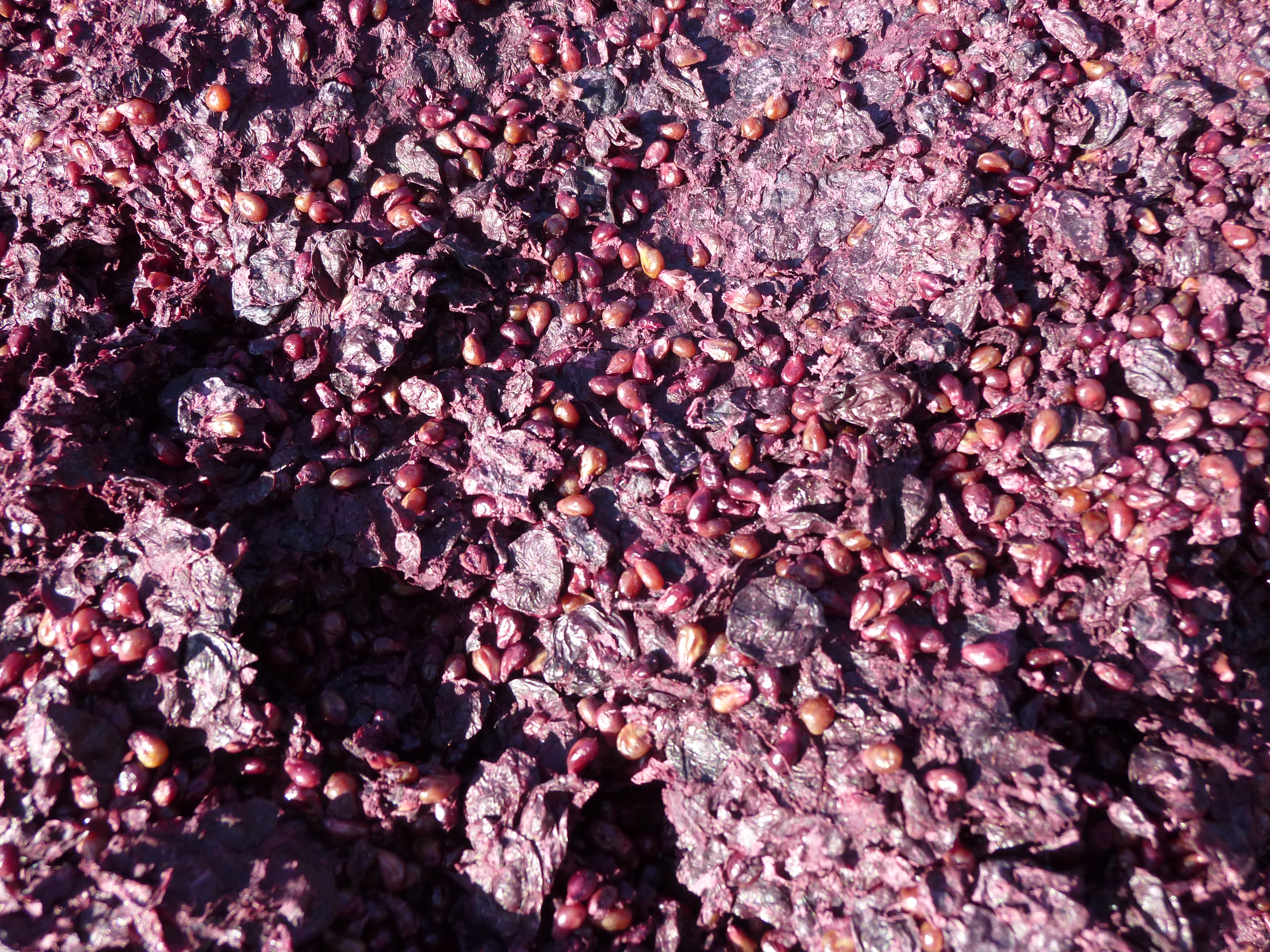
One traditional way of providing nutrients for the yeast is the ripasso method where the leftover grape skins and pomace (pictured) from a previous fermentation is added to a newly fermenting wine.

Many of these nutrients are available in the must and skins of the grapes themselves but sometimes are supplemented by winemakers with additions such as diammonium phosphate (DAP), freeze-dried micro-nutrients (such as Go-Ferm and Ferm-K) and even the remnant of dead or extracted yeast cells such that the fermenting yeast can break down to mine for available nitrogen and nutrients. One historical winemaking tradition that is still practiced in some Italian wine regions is the ripasso method of adding the leftover pomace from the pressing of other wines into a newly fermenting batch of wine as an additional food source for the yeast.

Saccharomyces cerevisiae can assimilate nitrogen from both inorganic (ammonia and ammonium) and organic forms (amino acids, particularly arginine). As yeast cells die, enzymes within the cells begin autolyzing by breaking down the cell, including the amino acids. This autolysis of the cell provides an available nitrogen source for the still-fermenting and viable yeast cells. However, this autolysis can also release sulfur-link compounds (such as the breakdown of amino acid cysteine) which can combine with other molecules and react with alcohol to create volatile thiols that can contribute to a "stinky fermentation" or later development into various wine faults.

=== The role of oxygen ===
Yeasts are facultative anaerobes meaning that they can exist in both the presence and absence of oxygen. While fermentation is traditionally thought of as an anaerobic process done in the absence of oxygen, early exposure of the yeast to oxygen can be a vital component in the successful completion of that fermentation. This is because oxygen is important in the synthesis of cell "survival factors" such as ergosterol and lanosterol. These sterols are important in maintaining the selective permeability of the yeast cell membrane which becomes critical as the yeast becomes exposed to increasing osmotic pressure and levels of alcohol in the wine. As a waste product of its own metabolism, alcohol is actually very toxic to yeast cells. Yeast with weak survival factors and lacking sterols may succumb to these conditions before fermenting a wine to complete dryness, leaving a stuck fermentation.

Cultured yeasts that are freeze-dried and available for inoculation of wine must are deliberately grown in commercial labs in high oxygen/low sugar conditions that favor the development of these survival factors. One of the reasons that some winemakers prefer using inoculated yeast is the predictability of fermentation due to the high level of survival factors that cultured yeast are assured of having without necessarily needing to expose the wine to additional levels of oxygen. Winemakers using "ambient" yeasts that are resident in their winery may not have this same assurance of survival factors and may need to compensate with other winemaking techniques.

Wild non-Saccharomyces yeasts often need a much greater exposure to oxygen in order to build up survival factors which is why many of these yeasts are often found living oxidatively as "film yeast" on the surface of wines in tanks or barrels.

== Wine faults related to yeast ==
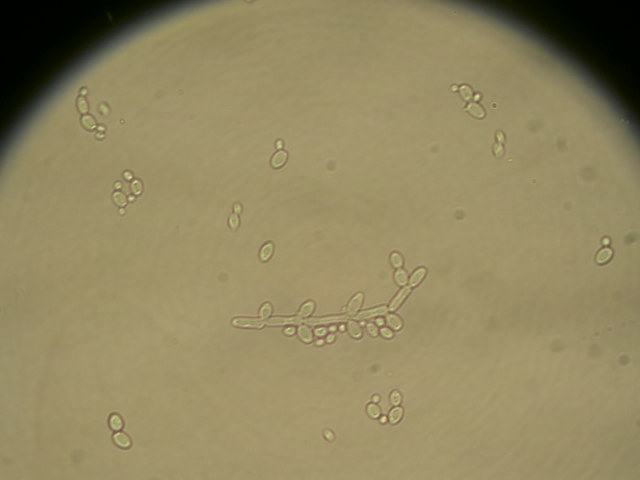
Film yeast like Candida (pictured) and Pichia can cover the surface of a wine with a film layer that not only consumed most of the free sulfur dioxide available to protect the wine but also produces high levels of acetic acid that will contribute to volatile acidity in a wine.

Either directly or indirectly, wine yeast can be a culprit behind a wide variety of wine faults. These can include the presence of "off flavors" and aromas that can be the by-product of some "wild yeast" fermentation such as those by species within the genera of Kloeckera and Candida. Even the common wine yeast Saccharomyces cerevisiae can be behind some wine faults with some strains of the yeast known to produce higher than ideal levels of acetic acid, acetaldehyde and volatile sulfur compounds such as thiols. Also any yeast can have a low tolerance to nutritional deficiencies, temperature fluctuation or extremes and excessive or low sugar levels that may lead to a stuck fermentation.

In the presence of oxygen several species of Candida and Pichia can create a film surface on top of the wine in the tank of barrel. Allowed to go unchecked, these yeasts can rapidly deplete the available free sulfur compounds that keeps a wine protected from oxidation and other microbial attack. The presence of these yeasts is often identified by elevated levels of volatile acidity, particularly acetic acid. Some strains of Pichia will metabolize acetic acid (as well as ethyl acetate and isoamyl acetate that may also be produced) with the side-effect of substantially decreasing the titratable acidity and shifting the pH of wine upwards to levels that make the wine prone to attack by other spoilage microbes. Commonly called "film yeast", these yeasts are distinguished from the flor sherry yeast that are usually welcomed by winemakers in producing the delicate fino-style wines.

Growth of many unfavorable wild yeasts is generally slowed at lower cellar temperatures, so many winemakers who wish to inhibit the activities of these yeasts before the more favorable Saccharomyces yeast kick in, will often chill their must, such as the practice of "cold soaking" the must during a pre-fermentation maceration at temperatures between 4–15 °C (39–59 °F). Though some species, such as Brettanomyces, will not be inhibited and may even thrive during an extended period of cold soaking.

=== Brettanomyces ===
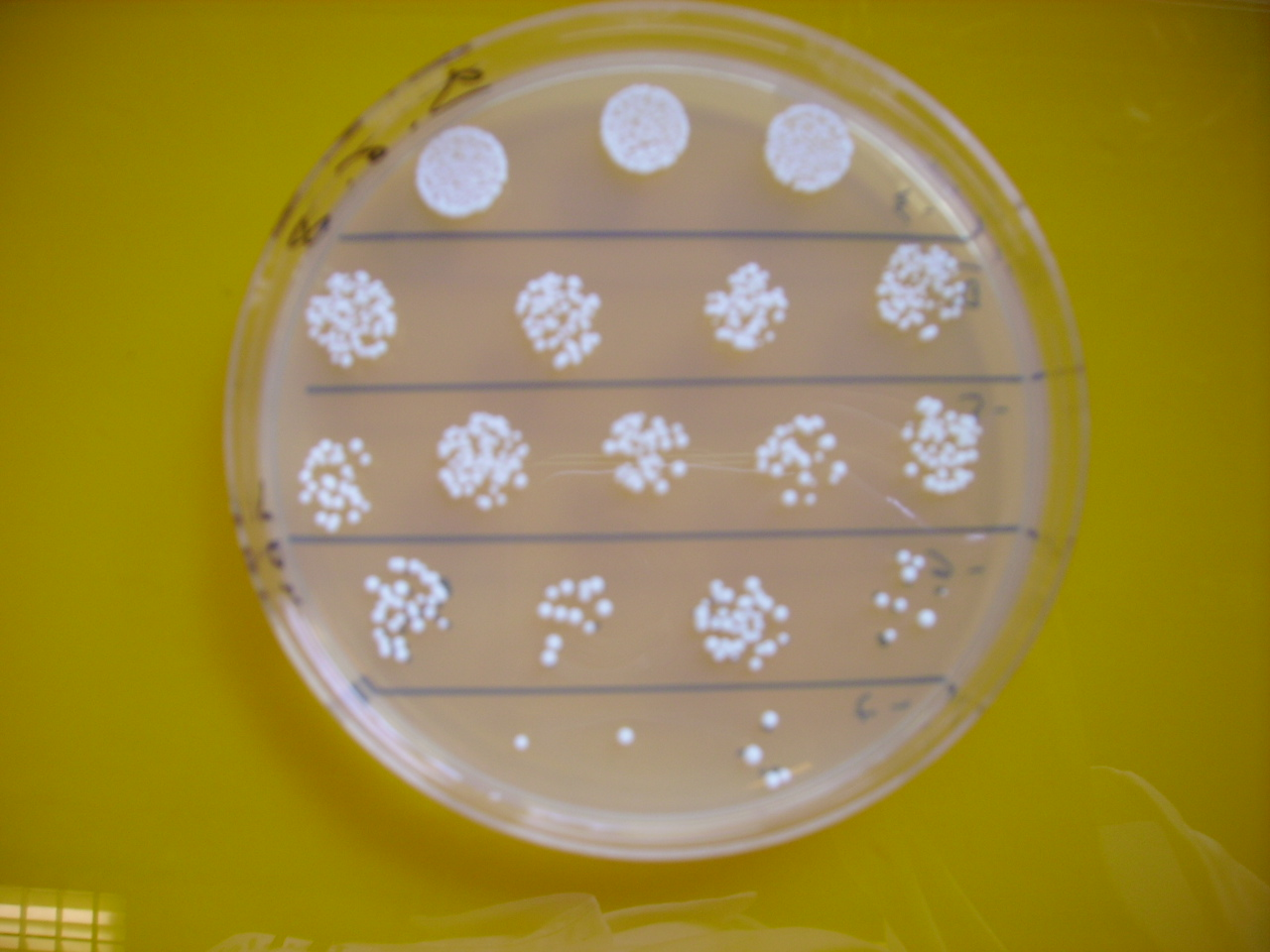
While some wine regions view the influence of Brettanomyces on the wine, in limited amounts, as added complexity, many winemakers view the presence of Brettanomyces species such as Brettanomyces bruxellensis (pictured) in their wineries as a negative influence that needs to be controlled.

The wine yeast Brettanomyces (or "Brett") produces very distinctive aroma compounds, 4-Ethylphenol (4-EP) and 4-Ethylguaiacol (4-EG), that can have a wine being described as smelling like a "barnyard", "wet saddle" or "band-aid". To some winemakers and with some wine styles (such as Pinot noir from Burgundy), a limited amount of these compounds could be considered a positive attribute that adds to the complexity of wine. To other winemakers and with other wine styles (such as Riesling from the Mosel), the presence of any Brett will be considered a fault. Fruit flies are common vector in the transfer of Brettanomyces between tanks and even nearby wineries.

As a fermentation yeast, Brettanomyces can usually ferment a wine up to 10–11% alcohol levels before they die out. Sometimes Brettanomyces already present in a wine that has been inoculated with Saccharomyces cerevisiae will out compete the Saccharomyces strain for nutrients and even inhibit it due to the high levels of acetic acid, decanoic acid and octanoic acid that many strains of Brettanomyces can produce.

Once Brett is in a winery, it is very difficult to control even with strict hygiene and the discarding of barrels and equipment that has previously come into contact with "Bretty" wine. This is because many species of Brettanomyces can use a wide variety of carbon sources in wine and grape must, including ethanol, for metabolism. Additionally, Brett can produce a wide range of by-products that could influence the wine beyond just the 4-EP and 4-EG compounds previously discussed. Many of these compounds, such as the "footprints" of the 4-EP and 4-EG, will still remain in the wine even after yeast cells die and are removed by racking and sterile filtration.
