= Wild yeast =

Wild yeast could refer to:

- Yeast#Ecology
- Yeast in winemaking
- Brewing#Spontaneous fermentation
- Sourdough
- Cider#Yeast
