= Cell wall protein 2 =

Protein

Cell wall protein CWP2

Identifiers
- Organism: Saccharomyces cerevisiae
- Symbol: CWP2
- Entrez: 853765
- RefSeq (mRNA): NM_001180025.1
- RefSeq (Prot): NP_012826.1
- UniProt: P43497

Other data
- Chromosome: XI: 0.26 - 0.26 Mb
Search for
- Structures: Swiss-model
- Domains: InterPro

Cell wall protein 2 (CWP2) is a cell wall protein, produced by Saccharomyces cerevisiae and Saccharomyces pastorianus. It occurs throughout the cell wall and has close homology with the CWP1 gene.

Disruption of CWP2 gene positively regulate translation, ribosome biogenesis and organonitrogen synthesis. these factors combined increases the overall synthesis of intercellular enzymes. Disruption of CWP2 genes also cause physical changes to the cell wall. Thickness of the cell wall decreases combined with decrease in cell wall density results in decline of cell wall stability. The overall result is the increase in the ability of heterologous protein production, in which is a significant commission of saccharomyces

== Function ==
Cell Wall Protein 2 (CWP2) is a cell mannoprotein that is covalently bonded to the cell wall and serves as a significant component of the cell wall structure. Generally, mannoproteins are special glycoproteins specifically in the outer part of the yeast cell wall and contributes to the yeast's ability to withstand acidic conditions in protection of the structure. CWP's transcription during S/G2 phases determines its primary presence and formation in the yeast wall. Beyond preserving the integrity and functionality of the cellular structure, CWP2 are involved in various cellular processes and interactions in its environment. It aids in balancing proton levels inside the cell and managing the internal pH level, particularly in strains of lipids that lack the backbone of sphingoid bases.

== Structure ==
The CWP structure is connected to structural polysaccharide fibrils categorized into two primary groups. The first group is referred to as GPI-CWP and connected to β-1,6-glucan called glycophosphatidylinositol (GPI). The second group are known as Pir (proteins with internal repeats), forming a direct link with the β-1,3-glucan. CWP2 belongs to the first group of GPI anchor precursors. The GPI (Glycosylphosphatidylinositol) anchor is a lipid modification that occurs after protein translation within the endoplasmic reticulum; they are formed naturally occurring phosphatidylinositols (PIs) and bond to proteins within the endoplasmic reticulum.

The structure of CWP2 is divided into three segments. Two of these domains form a two-layer sandwich shape while the third domain has a single alpha helix, a small beta-sheet, and loops. The second domain is connected to the first domain, allowing it to rotate and alter the overall shape of CWP2. Other S-layer proteins share similarities in their domain arrangement and the way they pivot around a connecting point between their first and second domains. The structural segments suggest that CWP2 and similar proteins have similar flexibility and structural behaviors. Cell wall protein 2 (CWP2) falls under the section of mannoproteins in the yeast cell wall. The structural analysis of CWP2 suggests similarities with CWP8 in their three-domain structure. There are differences in domain 2 proteins that impact adhesive strength that influence its ability to adhere to host cells.

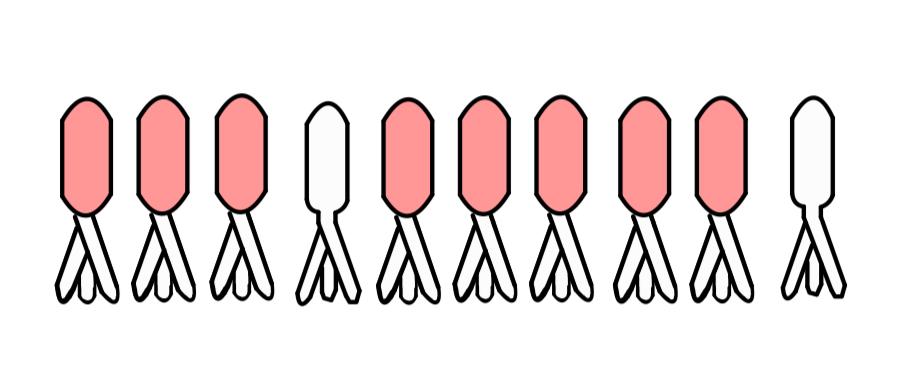
S-layer and Cell Wall Proteins

CWP2, a 66kDa protein detected primarily in the surface extracts of Clostridioides difficile strains across different serotypes and ribotypes, is a component of the S-layer assembly. This protein is not only localized within the S-layer but is also found in the spore coat and culture supernatants of these strains. The protein's functional part extends from residues 29 to 318. An N-terminal 38–41 kDa fragment of Cwp2 appears in culture supernatant, especially during conditions promoting high toxin production. CWP2 is located in the S-layer that self assemble into a crystal structure where molecules are organized in a grid. Within the S-layer, the structure are primarily composed of proteins. The assembly of the layer constitutes crucial components to the cell's integrity and biological functions. In pathogenic and commensal microbes, these S-layers are involved in interactions with the host organism and modulation of the immune system response.

== Mutations ==
CWP2, a gene identified in Saccharomyces cerevisiae, is crucial for the cell's response to acidity. In the instances where yeast cells lack sphingolipids, they struggle to thrive in low pH environments. Specific strains such LprR possess a genetic alteration aiding their growth even without sphingolipids in environments as acidic as pH 4.1. This genetic mutation is connected to the LPR suppressor gene, enhancing the ability of sphingolipid-lacking cells to eliminate acidic protons from their surroundings. Elevating the copy count of the CWP2 gene heightens the likelihood of obtaining LprR strains due to the proteins assistance in sphingolipid-deficient cells. Disrupting the CWP2 gene leads to an 85.9% increase in extracellular cellobiohydrolase activity, while its overexpression results in a reduced growth rate. Moreover, the removal of CWP2 makes the mutant more sensitive to cell wall-affecting agents like zymolyase, caffeine, and papulacandin. Disruption of the protein influences the activity of genes involved in producing ribosomes that indicates involvement in both cell wall building and protein production. Specific genes responsible for coding cell wall mannoproteins (CWP2) in yeast were removed or deleted that resulted in the increased permeability of the cell wall that allowed genotoxic agents to enter. The size and nature of chemicals influence their penetration through the cell wall. The deletion of CWP1 and CWP2 genes significantly increase permeability, especially to larger compounds like phleomycin. These mutations affected sensitivities to various mutagens, indicating a complex relationship between cell wall permeability and chemical entry. The absence of CWP2 may lead to higher toxin levels due to changes in cell integrity.

== Toxin resistance ==
Investigations targeting resistance to PMKT revealed deletion of CWP2 contribute to cell resistance to PMKT, a killer toxin from Pichia membranifaciens, and prevent the toxin binding. PMKT is specifically a low molecular mass toxin produced by Pichia membranifaciens, a yeast species. The toxin induces cell death through different mechanisms through PMKT, triggering ionic movements and intracellular pH changes. The activation of the High Osmolarity Glycerol (HOG) pathway and PMKT2 cease replication of DNA during the S-phase in DNA synthesis that ultimately lead to apoptosis. Mutants lacking GPI anchoring exhibit reduced sensitivity to PMKT, signifying alterations in sensitivity or resistance. The GPI anchor serves as a component facilitating the interaction between CWP2 and PMKT. While most gene deletions showed minimal effects on toxin resistance, proteins like CWP2 at the cell periphery has shown its significance to PMKT activity. CWP2, equipped with a GPI anchor, emerged as a likely toxin receptor, important in the cellular response leading to cell death. Both the mature and GPI-anchored precursor of CWP2 are implicated in PMKT's mechanism, evident from their decreased binding in sensitive mutants. Its involvement in PMKT's mechanism is associated with its proximity to the cell membrane. The interaction through electrostatic differences suggests CWP2's essential role in facilitating PMKT activity as a secondary receptor. It acts as a bridge between beta 1-6 D-glucans and the plasma membrane, intensifying toxin binding and its toxic effects.
