= Saccharomyces pastorianus =

Scientific classification
- Kingdom: Fungi
- Division: Ascomycota
- Class: Saccharomycetes
- Order: Saccharomycetales
- Family: Saccharomycetaceae
- Genus: Saccharomyces
- Species: S. pastorianus

Binomial name
- Saccharomyces pastorianus Nguyen & Gaillardin ex. Beijerinck

Type strain
- CBS 1538

Synonyms
- Saccharomyces carlsbergensis; Saccharomyces lagerae

Species of fungus

Saccharomyces pastorianus is a yeast used industrially for the production of lager beer, and was named in honour of Louis Pasteur by the German Max Reess in 1870. This yeast's complicated genome appears to be the result of hybridisation between two pure species in the Saccharomyces species complex, a factor that led to difficulty in establishing a proper taxonomy of the species.

The now-defunct synonym Saccharomyces carlsbergensis was and continues to be used in scientific literature, but is invalid, as the name Saccharomyces pastorianus (Reess 1870) has taxonomic precedence. The name S. carlsbergensis is typically attributed to Emil Christian Hansen from the era when he worked for the Danish brewery Carlsberg in 1883, but in actuality it was not officially described by Hansen as a distinct species until 1908, along with another synonym, Saccharomyces monacensis. The type strains of both synonyms are currently stored in yeast banks under the taxonomic name S. pastorianus.

== History ==
So-called bottom-fermenting strains of brewing yeast were described as early as the 14th century in Nuremberg and have remained an indispensable part of both Franconian and Bavarian brewing culture in southern Germany through modern times. During the explosion of scientific mycological studies in the 19th century, the yeast responsible for producing these so-called "bottom fermentations" was finally given a taxonomical classification, Saccharomyces pastorianus, by the German Max Reess in 1870.

In 1883 the Dane Emil Hansen published the findings of his research at the Carlsberg brewery in Copenhagen and described the isolation of a favourable pure yeast culture that he labelled "Unterhefe Nr. I" (bottom-fermenting yeast no. 1), a culture that he identified as identical to the sample originally donated to Carlsberg in 1845 by the Spaten Brewery of Munich. This yeast soon went into industrial production in Copenhagen in 1884 as Carlsberg yeast no. 1.

In 1904 Hansen published an important body of work where he reclassified the separate yeasts he worked with in terms of species, rather than as races or strains of the same species as he had previously done. Here Hansen classified a separate species of yeast isolated from the Carlsberg brewery as S. pastorianus, a name derived from and attributed to Reess 1870. This strain was admitted to the Centraalbureau voor Schimmelcultures (CBS) in 1935 as strain CBS 1538, Saccharomyces pastorianus Reess ex Hansen 1904. In a further publication in 1908, Hansen reclassified the original "Unterhefe Nr. I" as the new species Saccharomyces carlsbergensis and another yeast "Unterhefe Nr. II" as the new species Saccharomyces monacensis. The taxonomy was attributed to Hansen 1908 and the yeasts entered into the Centraalbureau voor Schimmelcultures in 1947 as CBS 1513 and CBS 1503 respectively.

Since the early 1900s, bottom-fermenting strains of brewery yeast have been typically classified as S. carlsbergensis in scientific literature, and the earlier valid name assigned to a bottom-fermenting yeast by Reess in 1870 was rejected without merit. This situation was rectified using DNA-DNA reallocation techniques in 1985 when Vaughan-Martini and Kurtzman returned the species name to S. pastorianus under the type strain CBS 1538 and relegated the two former species assigned by Hansen in 1908, S. carlsbergensis CBS 1513 and S. monacensis CBS 1503, to the status of synonyms. These experiments also clearly revealed the hybrid nature of the lager brewing yeast species for the first time, even though one of the parental species was incorrectly classified in retrospect. Nonetheless, over the last decades of the 20th century, debate continued in scientific literature regarding the correct taxon, with authors using both names interchangeably to describe lager yeast.

== Genomics ==
The lager yeast Saccharomyces pastorianus has been known to be an interspecific hybrid between Saccharomyces cerevisiae and another Saccharomyces yeast since at least 1985, but the exact nature of its parents and its proper taxonomy continued to be the subject of much debate. Various candidates for the non-cerevisiae parent were proposed, such as CBS 1503 (formerly known as S. monacensis) and CBS 395 (type strain of S. uvarum) a strain whose taxonomy is also hotly debated. Most commonly strain CBS 380 (type strain of S. bayanus) has been attributed as the second parent.

In 2011 it was postulated that the unidentified genome sequence belonged to a yet to be classified natural species. This was confirmed shortly after with the discovery in Argentina of the new species, Saccharomyces eubayanus, with a genome 99% identical to the non-cerevisiae portion of the S. pastorianus genome, irrefutably confirming it to be the second parental species. Domestication involves the loss of a SUL1 gene. S. bayanus CBS 380 was also demonstrated to be a sibling hybrid derived from S. eubayanus (with S. pastorianus introgression on the SUL1 locus) and S. uvarum.

A 2014 study reports on the discovery of S. eubayanus in China, Tibet and Mongolia, further confirming the existence of the species. More importantly, the sequenced parts of two Himalayan genomes are 99.82% similar to the corresponding non-cerevisiae parts of S. pastorianus. As of 2014, most authorities have agreed that the bottom-fermenting yeast S. pastorianus was created by the inter-specific hybridisation between Holoarctic S. eubayanus and S. cerevisiae, but had not reached consensus on whether the mating event took place in Asia or Europe (it is plausible that a Tibetan-like strain crossed the Silk Road to reach Europe and hybridized there). Work in 2016 revealed that although the eubayanus subgenome mostly comes from the holarctic group (which includes the Himalayan strains), there appears to be no single eubayanus strain that gave rise to the two groups of pastorianus. Instead, the genetic variations among the holarctic group presist in pastorianus.

=== Future genome work ===
Debate over taxonomy appears to have concluded, thus new research is now focused on the variation observed within members of S. pastorianus proper. Analyses of lager brewing yeasts have revealed they could be classified into two groups based on their DNA structure, Frohberg type and Saaz type. In 2008 it was further concluded that the two groups were the result of two separate hybridisation events with the parent S. cerevisiae coming from a distinct ale/beer brewing origin. The two groups of lager-brewing yeasts are classified as either type I: Saaz type, allotriploid strains that appear to have lost large portions of their S. cerevisiae genome. These include strains CBS 1513 (formerly classified as S. carlsbergensis) and CBS 1503 (formerly classified as S. monacensis) or type 2: Frohberg type, allotetraploid strains that contain near complete sets of genomes from both parents. These include the strain Weihenstephan WS 34/70 considered close to the type strain of S. pastorianus CBS 1538.

In 2015, researchers succeeded in creating novel lager brewing yeasts by hybridizing selected strains of S. cerevisiae with S. eubayanus. These new hybrid yeasts inherited beneficial properties from both parent strains (e.g. maltotriose use, cold tolerance and flocculation) and outperformed them during fermentation (faster fermentation and higher alcohol yield). It is expected that the diversity of lager yeast strains will increase greatly in the future.

In 2019, it was found that Himalayan S. eubayanus carry several copies of the AGT1 gene (not found in the Patagonian strians) with high similarity to the S. pastorianus versions. The Himalayan strain cannot grow on maltose and maltotriose, yet carries functional maltose-hydrolase and SeMALT1 and SeAGT1 maltose transporter genes. On the other hand, S. cerevisiae has a MALx3 maltose regulator gene but no functional transporters or hydrolases. Hybridizing the two produces a "bottom-fermenting" yeast that, unlike both parents, can use maltotriose as the two genomes complement each other (a case of heterosis). The hybrid has a comnbination of maltose-related genes quite similar to the modern S. pastorianus.

On-going research is being conducted in the field of intraspecific Saccharomyces hybridization. One paper created novel hybrids from S. cerevisiae and S. arboricolus. Their findings were typical of similar studies, fermentation performance was more robust and the progeny/hybrids produced a mosaic of volatile sensory chemicals.

== See also ==
- Bottom- and top-fermenting yeast
- Brewing
- Geisenheim Yeast Breeding Center
- Lager
- Yeast
- Yeast in winemaking
