= Lager =

Type of beer brewed by cold fermentation

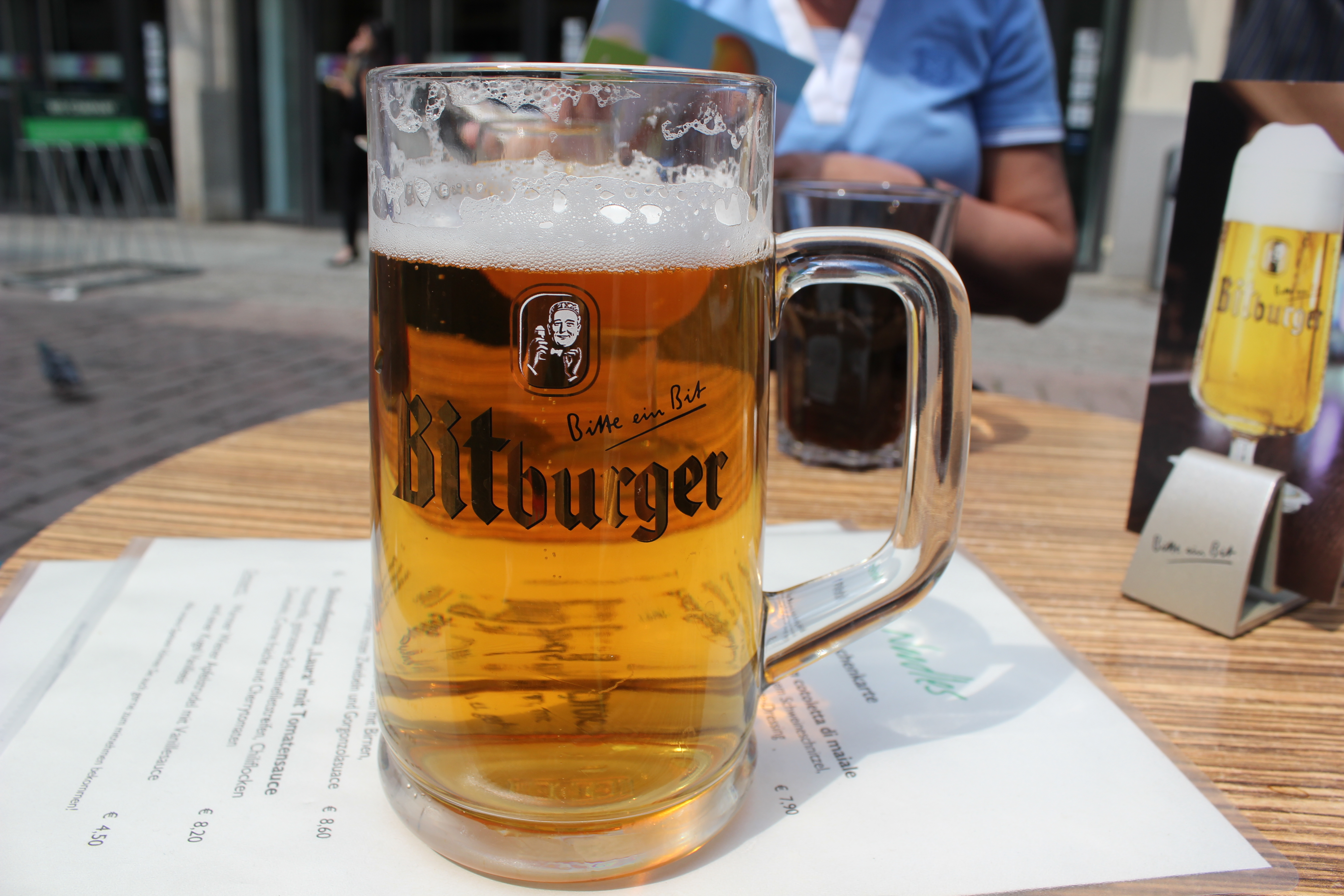
A glass of lager from Bitburger, a German brewery

Lager is a style of beer brewed and conditioned at low temperature. Lagers can be pale, amber, or dark. Pale lager is the most widely consumed and commercially available style of beer. The term lager comes from the German word for 'storage', as the beer was stored before drinking, traditionally in the same cool caves in which it was fermented.

As well as maturation in cold storage, most lagers are distinguished by the use of Saccharomyces pastorianus, a "bottom-fermenting" yeast that ferments at relatively cold temperatures.

== Etymology ==
Until the 19th century, the German word Lagerbier (de) referred to all types of bottom-fermented, cool-conditioned beer in normal strengths. In Germany today, it mainly refers to beers from southern Germany, either "Helles" (pale) or "Dunkles" (dark). Pilsner, a more heavily hopped pale lager, is most often known as "Pilsner", "Pilsener", or "Pils". Other lagers are Bock, Märzen, and Schwarzbier.

== History of lager brewing ==
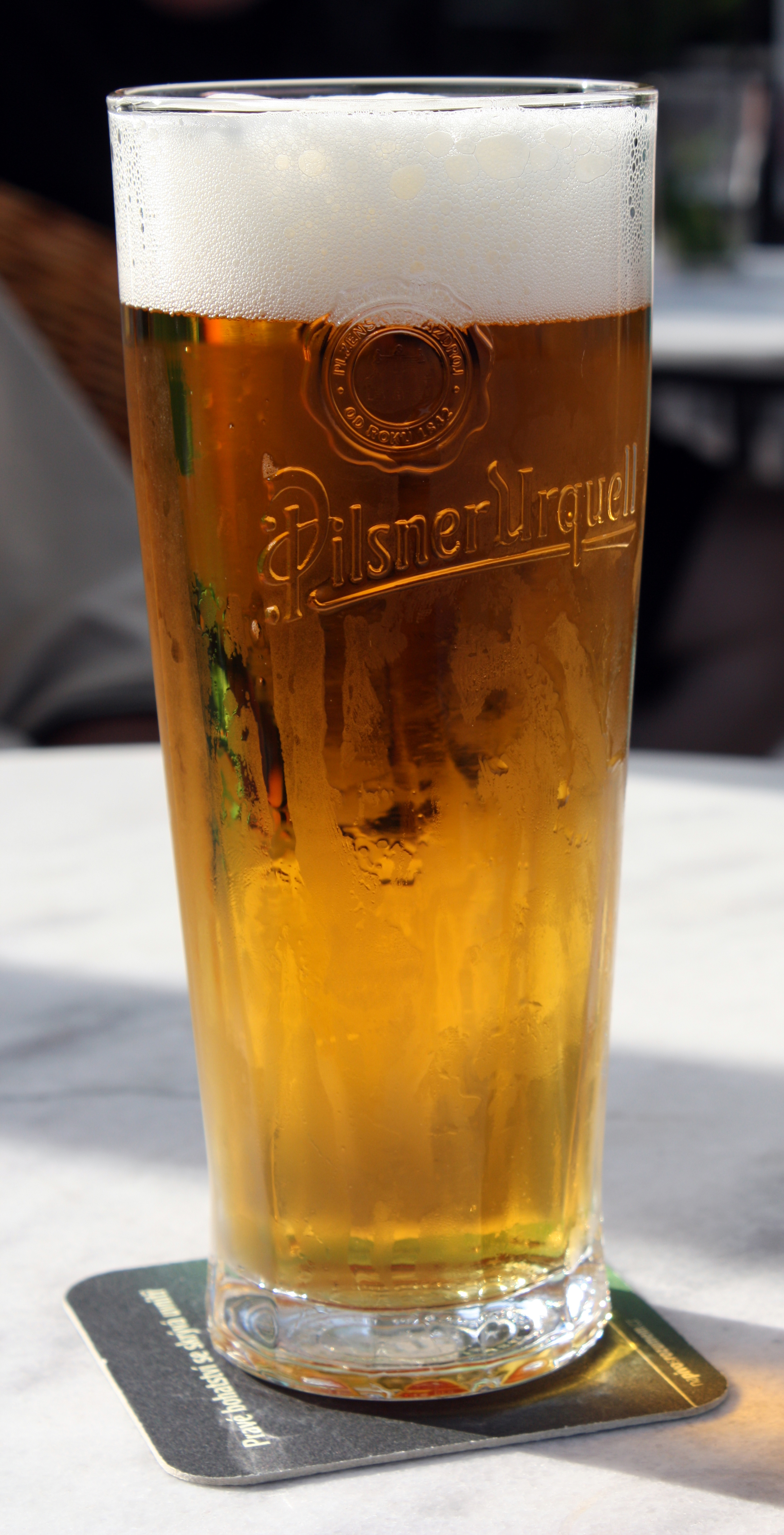
Czech lager

While cold storage of beer, "lagering", in caves for example, was a common practice throughout the medieval period, bottom-fermenting yeast seems to have emerged from a hybridization in the early fifteenth century.

In 2011, a team of researchers claimed to have discovered that Saccharomyces eubayanus is responsible for creating the hybrid yeast used to make lager.

Based on the numbers of breweries, lager brewing became the main form of brewing in the Kingdom of Bohemia between 1860 and 1870, as shown in the following table:

Year	Total breweries	Lager breweries	Lager percentage
1860	416	135	32.5%
1865	540	459	85.0%
1870	849	831	97.9%

In the 19th century, before the advent of refrigeration, German brewers would dig cellars for lagering and fill them with ice from nearby lakes and rivers, which would cool the beer during the summer months. To further protect the cellars from the summer heat, they would plant chestnut trees, which have spreading, dense canopies but shallow roots which would not intrude on the caverns. The practice of serving beer at these sites evolved into the modern beer garden.

The rise of lager was entwined with the development of refrigeration, as it made it possible to brew lager year-round (brewing in the summer had previously been banned in many locations across Germany), and efficient refrigeration also made it possible to brew lager in more places and keep it cold until serving. The first large-scale refrigerated lagering tanks were developed for Gabriel Sedelmayr's Spaten Brewery in Munich by Carl von Linde in 1870.

== Production process ==
Lager uses a process of cool fermentation, followed by maturation in cold storage. The German word "Lager" means storeroom or warehouse. The yeast generally used with lager brewing is Saccharomyces pastorianus. It is a close relative of the Saccharomyces cerevisiae yeast used for ales, which undergo warm fermentation at 18-24C.

While prohibited by the German Reinheitsgebot tradition, lagers in some countries may include a proportion of adjuncts, usually rice or maize. Adjuncts entered United States brewing as a means of thinning out the body of beers, balancing the large quantities of protein introduced by six-row barley. Adjuncts are often used now in beermaking to introduce a large quantity of sugar, and thereby increase ABV, at a lower price than a formulation using an all-malt grain bill. There are, however, cases in which adjunct usage actually increases the cost of manufacture.

It is possible to use lager yeast in a warm fermentation process, such as with American steam beer; while German Altbier and Kölsch ales are brewed with Saccharomyces cerevisiae top-fermenting ale yeast, but matured as a lager in cold storage, and classified as obergäriges lagerbier (top-fermented lager beer).

== Variations ==
Lagers range in colour from extremely pale, through amber beers such as Vienna lager, to dark brown and black Dunkel and Schwarzbier. The depth of colour comes from the specific grain bill used in the beers; paler lagers use unroasted barley and may even add other grains such as rice or corn to lighten the color and provide a crisp, bright finish to the flavour. Darker lagers use roasted grains and malts to produce a more roasted, even slightly burnt, flavour profile.

=== Pale lager ===
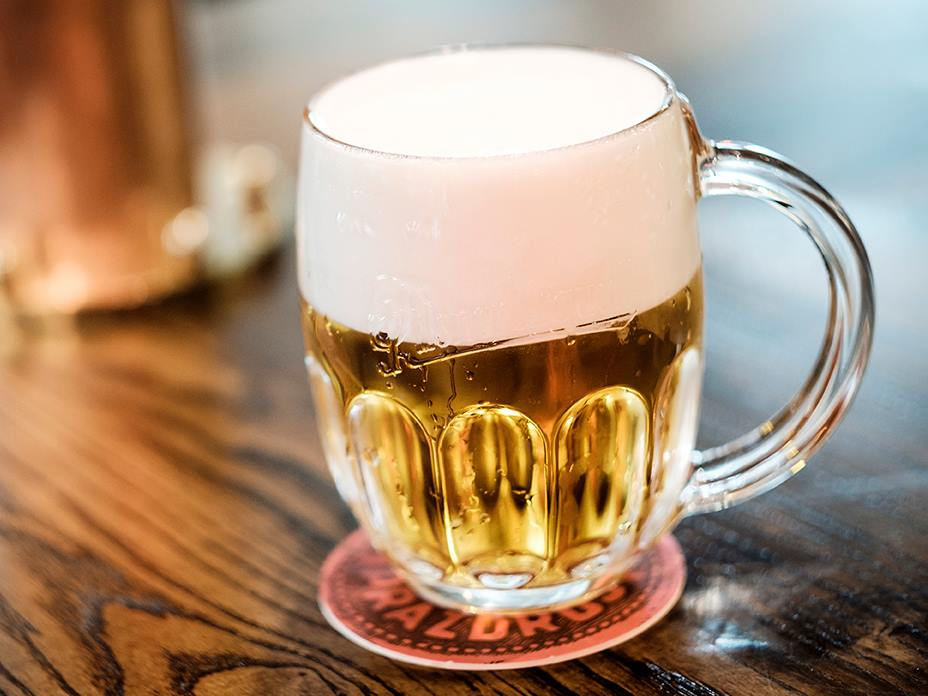
Czech Pilsener beer

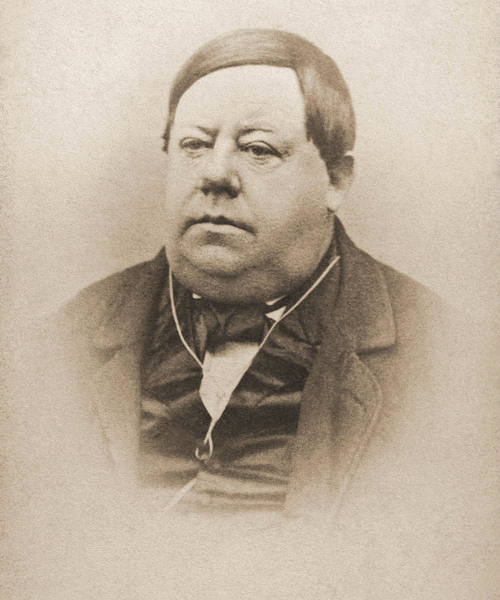
Josef Groll, sometimes called "the Father of the Pilsner"

The most common lagers in worldwide production are pale lagers. The flavour of these lighter lagers is usually mild, and the producers often recommend that the beers be served refrigerated.

Pale lager is a very pale to golden-coloured lager with a well attenuated body and noble hop bitterness. The brewing process for this beer developed in the mid 19th century when Gabriel Sedlmayr der Jüngere took pale ale brewing techniques back to the Spaten Brewery in Germany and applied it to existing lagering brewing methods.

This approach was picked up by other breweries, most notably the Pilsner Urquell Brewery in Pilsen, Bohemia (now part of the Czech Republic), where Josef Groll produced the first Pilsner beer. The resulting pale coloured, lean and stable beers were very successful and gradually spread around the globe to become the most common form of beer consumed in the world today.

Another pale lager variety is Helles, native to Munich.

In the United Kingdom, the term 'lager' usually refers to pale lager, being by far the most common style drunk there.

=== Amber lager ===
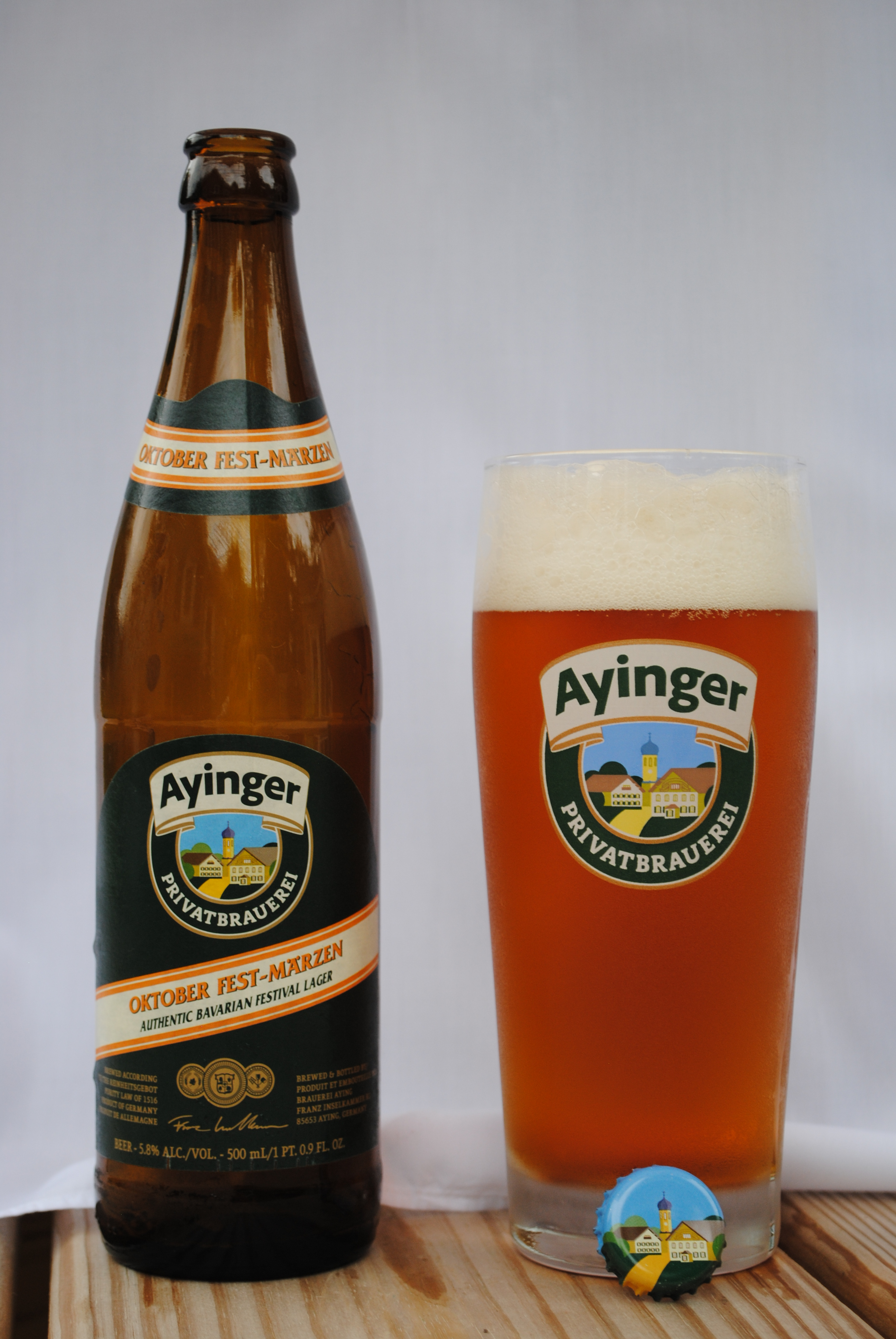
Oktoberfest Märzen

Amber lagers are generally darker in color than pale lagers, often a deep tan or amber color. Among the common styles of amber lager are Märzen, traditionally brewed in Munich for the celebration of Oktoberfest, Bock, a higher alcohol-content amber lager originating in Einbeck in central Germany, and the widely distributed Vienna lager.

The Vienna lager style was developed by Anton Dreher in the late 1830s. While on a trip to England and Scotland in 1833 with Gabriel Sedlmayr, Dreher gained knowledge of the pale malt making process. Dreher combined the pale malt making techniques with cold bottom fermentation, using yeast given to him by Sedlmayr. In late 1840, Anton Dreher started renting a cellar to mature his beer under cold conditions, a process that is called "lagering". The resulting beer was clean-tasting and relatively pale for the time thanks to the use of smoke-free "English" hot air kilns, resulting in a pale amber colour.

The beer style became well-known internationally, in particular due to the Dreher brewery's restaurant and beer hall at the International Exposition of 1867 in Paris, and started getting copied by many of the US-American lager breweries founded by German immigrants. The first amber-coloured Oktoberfest-Märzen brewed by Franziskaner-Leistbräu in 1872 was also a Vienna-style beer brewed to a higher strength.

The Vienna lager style has survived to this day, mostly thanks to the emerging microbrewing, home-brewing and craft beer scene in the United States of the 1980s and 1990s. Due to the influence of the American craft beer movement, Vienna lager can again be found in Europe, including traditional Austrian breweries like Ottakringer and Schwechater who have made this pale amber beer style part of their range of beers again.

A Vienna lager typically has a copper to reddish-brown colour, low bitterness, low hop profile, a malty aroma, and 4.8–5.4% alcohol by volume.

=== Dark lager ===
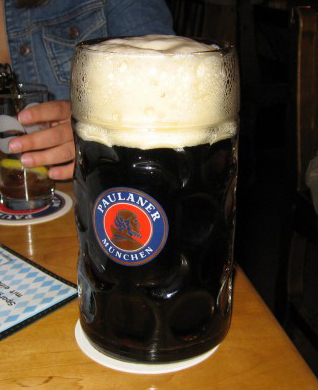
German Dunkel beer

Dunkel is German for "dark". Dunkel was the original style of the Bavarian villages and countryside, and the most common lager beer in the 19th century. At 4.5% to 6% abv, Dunkel is weaker than Doppelbock, a stronger dark Bavarian beer.

Pale lagers were not common until the later part of the 19th century, when the use of lighter roasted malts spread. Dark lagers may be called Dunkel, tmavé or Schwarzbier depending on region, colour or brewing method. Tmavé is Czech for "dark" – beers which are so dark as to be black are termed černé pivo, "black beer". Schwarzbier, a much darker, almost black beer with a chocolate or licorice-like flavour, similar to stout, is brewed in Saxony and Thuringia.

== See also ==
- Ale – Type of beer brewed using a warm fermentation method
