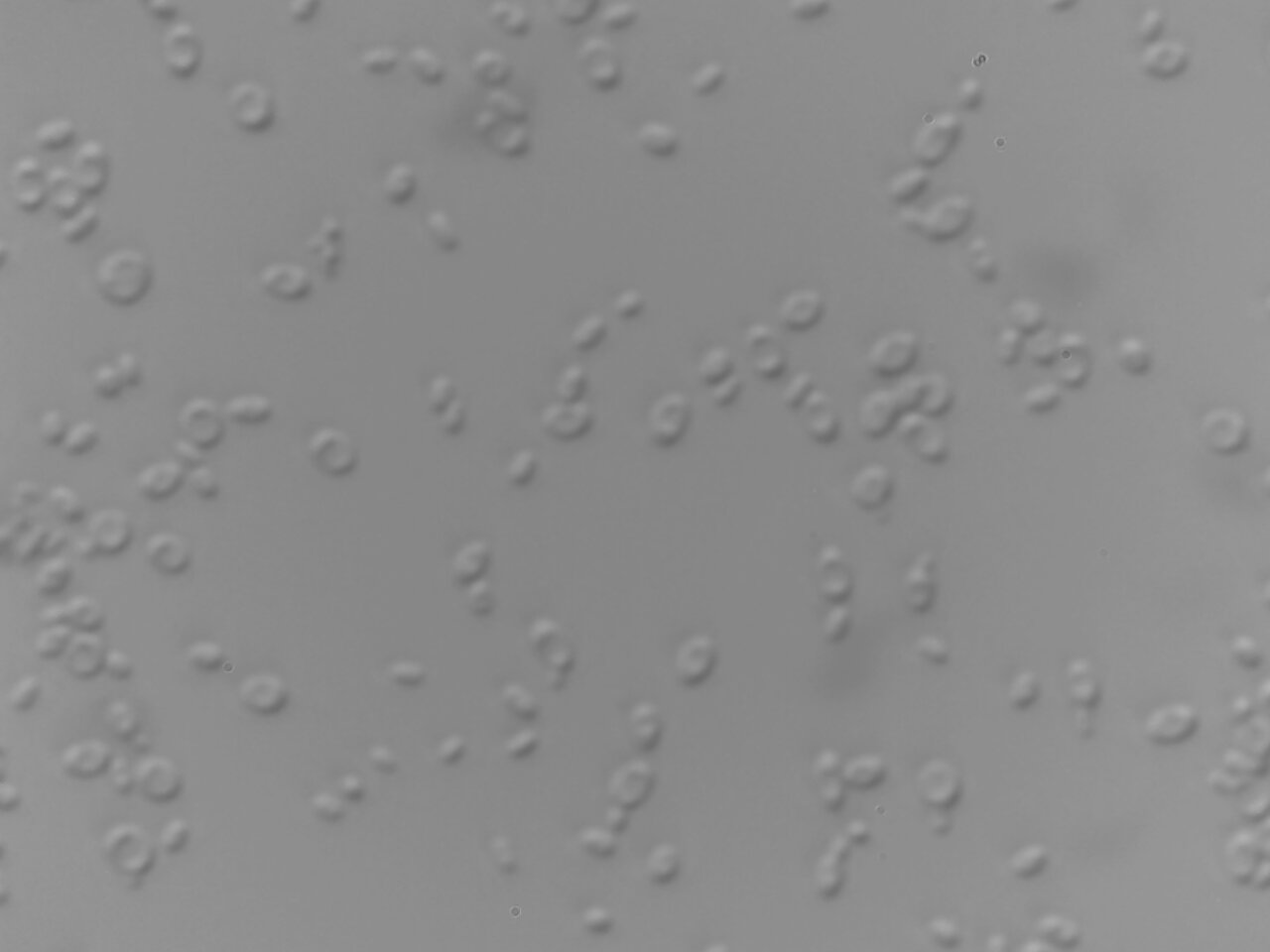

Scientific classification
- Kingdom: Fungi
- Division: Ascomycota
- Class: Saccharomycetes
- Order: Saccharomycetales
- Family: Saccharomycetaceae
- Genus: Saccharomyces
- Species: S. eubayanus

Binomial name
- Saccharomyces eubayanus J.P. Samp., Libkind, Hittinger, P. Gonç., E. Valério, C. Gonç., Dover & M. Johnst.

= Saccharomyces eubayanus =

Species of fungus

Saccharomyces eubayanus, a cryotolerant (cold tolerant) type of yeast, is most likely the parent of the lager brewing yeast, Saccharomyces pastorianus. It is also a parent of Saccharomyces bayanus, a wine and cider yeast.

Lager is a type of beer created from malted barley and fermented at low temperatures, originally in Bavaria. S. eubayanus was first discovered in Patagonia and is capable of fermenting glucose, along with the disaccharide maltose at reduced temperatures. Although originally considered a possible case of Columbian exchange, Tibetan (Himalayan) strains of S. eubayanus proved more similar to S. pastorianus than the Patagonian strains at 99.82%.

== History ==
With the emergence of lager beer in the 14th century, S. eubayanus was considered to be the progenitor of S. pastorianus along with S. cerevisiae. Since 1985 the non-cerevisiae ancestor has been contentiously debated between S. eubayanus, and S. bayanus which "is not found outside the brewing environment". Upon the 2011 discovery of S. eubayanus in Argentina and consequential genome analysis, S. eubayanus was found to be 99% genetically identical to S. pastorianus and S. bayanus was dismissed as an ancestor.

First described in 2011, S. eubayanus was discovered in North Patagonia, ecologically associated with Nothofagus spp. (Southern Beech) forests and the parasitic biotrophic fungi Cyttaria spp. With discoveries in other parts of the world shortly after in east Asia, the South American origins of S. eubayanus have been challenged by genomic and phylogenetic evidence that suggests a Tibetan origin. The proponents of this theory argue that it "corresponds better with geography and world trade history" given the Eurasian land bridge. Since then, genomic analyses from South America strains have shown reduced genetic diversity suggesting a biogeographical radiation point from Patagonia.

In 2022, a researcher team from the University College Dublin isolated Saccharomyces eubayanus from soil samples in Ireland. Further isolations from different locations in Europe can be expected.

Phylogenetically, S. eubayanus is basal in the Saccharomyces genus, and well-adjusted to the cooler environment of Nothofagus forests, Saccharomyces species with thermo-tolerance are suggested to be derived traits.

== Genomics ==
Population genomic analyses have identified four main populations of S. eubayanus (in bold):

- - **West China**
  - **Sichuan**
- - **Patagonia A**
  - **Patagonia B/Holarctic**
    - PB-2
    - - PB-1
      - Holarctic

The Patagonia A and Patagonia B groups are about 1% divergent to each other. The West China and Sichuan strains are more divergent and sometimes considered different subspecies. The closest relatives to the Lager yeasts lie in the Holactic group. However, there appears to be no single strain in this group that served as the ancestor, as the genetic variation within the Holarctic group is partly preserved among the Lager yeasts. Some Lager yeasts show further later admixture with Patagonia A strains.

Lager yeasts consist of two distinct lineages, said to have been hybridized from independent events 1000 years ago. Type one, called Saaz contains the allotriploid strains with one copy of the S. cerevisiae genome and two copies of the S. eubayanus genome. The second type, Frohberg, houses allotetraploid strains with one full diploid genome copy of S. cerevisiae and S. eubayanus. Saaz strains, which are more physiologically similar to their S. eubayanus parent, are much more efficient at growing in low temperatures, reflecting S. eubayanus's cryotolerant properties.

S. eubayanus is said to provide the bottom-fermentation and cold temperature genetics that distinguish this species from the top-brewing and bread-making relative S. cerevisiae. The ability to use maltotriose ("bottom ferment") specifically came from the two subgenomes complementing for each other's deficiencies in the maltotriose-utilization pathway, a case of heterosis.

A de novo assembly of the S. eubayanus genome yielded 5,515 protein-coding genes, 4,993 of which were unambiguous 1:1 orthologs to S. cerevisiae, and S. uvarum.

== Uses ==
In 2015, an interspecific hybridization of S. cerevisiae and S. eubayanus was successful in creating novel lager brewing yeasts. However hybrid genomes can result in genetic instability in industrial uses.

In 2016, S. eubayanus was used itself to brew lager beer.
