= Saccharomyces chevalieri =

Scientific classification
- Domain: Eukaryota
- Kingdom: Fungi
- Division: Ascomycota
- Class: Saccharomycetes
- Order: Saccharomycetales
- Family: Saccharomycetaceae
- Genus: Saccharomyces
- Species: S. chevalieri

Binomial name
- Saccharomyces chevalieri Guilliermond 1914

Species of fungus

Saccharomyces chevalieri is the dominant species of yeast found in coconut palm wine fermentations. It is similar to Saccharomyces cerevisiae, but lacks the ability to ferment maltose (absent from the palm wine fermentation environment) and has been advanced as an intermediate to the development of S. cerevisiae. It appears to fill similar niche in fermenting simple sugars to ethanol in later fermentation.
