= Saccharomyces bayanus =

Scientific classification
- Kingdom: Fungi
- Division: Ascomycota
- Class: Saccharomycetes
- Order: Saccharomycetales
- Family: Saccharomycetaceae
- Genus: Saccharomyces
- Species: S. bayanus

Binomial name
- Saccharomyces bayanus Saccardo, 1895

Type strain
- CBS 380

Species of fungus

Saccharomyces bayanus is a yeast of the genus Saccharomyces, and is used in winemaking and cider fermentation, and to make distilled beverages. Saccharomyces bayanus, like Saccharomyces pastorianus, is now accepted to be the result of multiple hybridisation events between three pure species, Saccharomyces uvarum, Saccharomyces cerevisiae and Saccharomyces eubayanus. Notably, most commercial yeast cultures sold as pure S. bayanus for wine making, e.g. Lalvin EC-1118 strain, have been found to contain S. cerevisiae cultures instead.

S. bayanus is used intensively in comparative genomics studies. Based on a computation-based experimental design system, Caudy et al. generated a rich resource for expression profiles for S. bayanus, which has been used in several comparative studies in yeast systems, including expression patterns and nucleosome profiles.

== See also ==
- Yeast in winemaking
