= Saccharomyces arboricolus =

Scientific classification
- Domain: Eukaryota
- Kingdom: Fungi
- Division: Ascomycota
- Class: Saccharomycetes
- Order: Saccharomycetales
- Family: Saccharomycetaceae
- Genus: Saccharomyces
- Species: S. arboricolus

Binomial name
- Saccharomyces arboricolus Naumov et al. 2000

Species of fungus

Saccharomyces arboricolus is a species of ascomycetous yeast in first isolated from tree bark. Its type strain is H-6^{T} (=AS 2.3317^{T} =CBS 10644^{T}).
