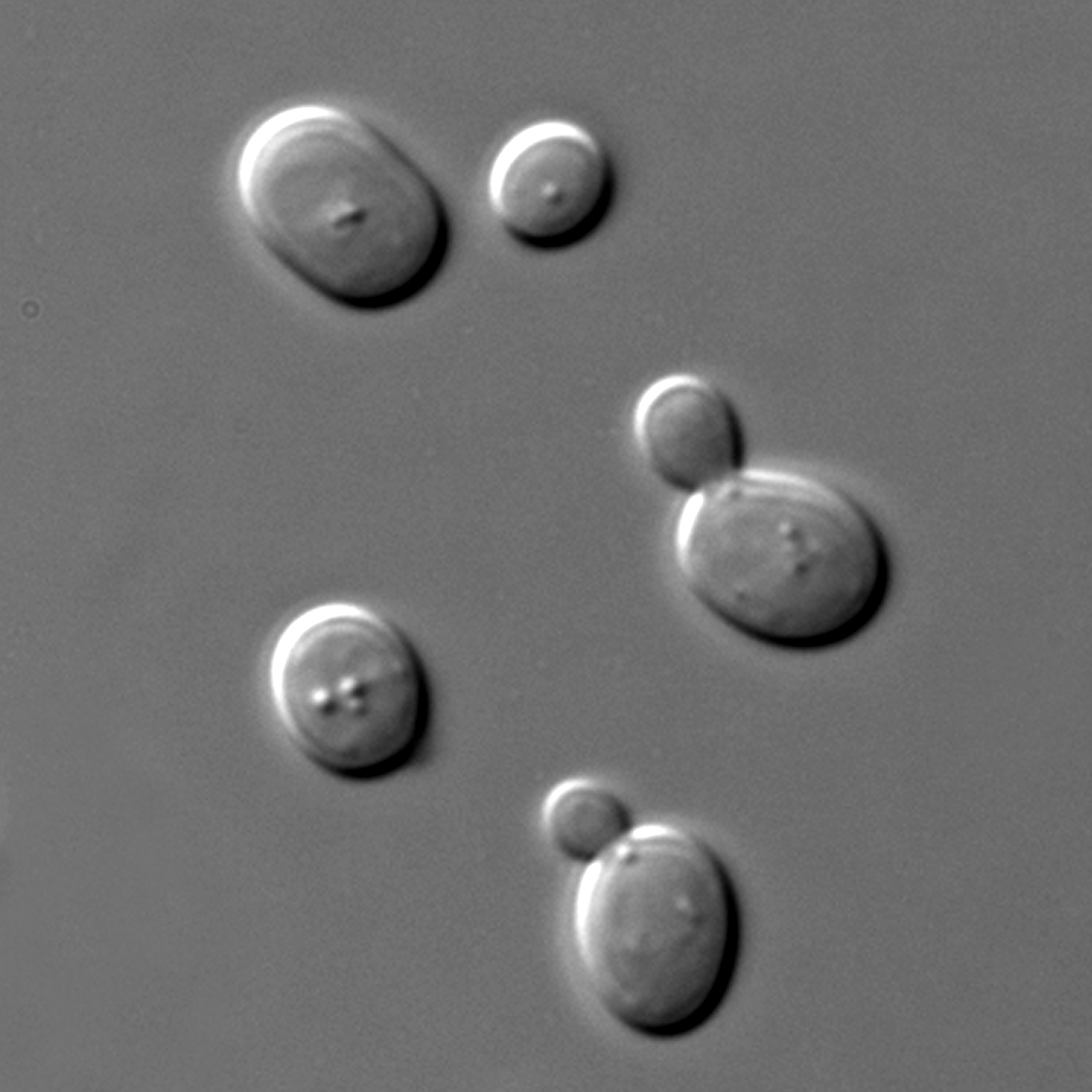

Scientific classification
- Kingdom: Fungi
- Division: Ascomycota
- Class: Saccharomycetes
- Order: Saccharomycetales
- Family: Saccharomycetaceae
- Genus: Saccharomyces; Meyen (1838)

Type species
- Saccharomyces cerevisiae Meyen (1838)

Species
- Saccharomyces arboricolus; Saccharomyces bayanus; Saccharomyces bulderi; Saccharomyces cariocanus; Saccharomyces cariocus; Saccharomyces cerevisiae; Saccharomyces cerevisiae var. boulardii; Saccharomyces chevalieri; Saccharomyces dairenensis; Saccharomyces ellipsoideus; Saccharomyces eubayanus; Saccharomyces exiguus; Saccharomyces florentinus; Saccharomyces fragilis; Saccharomyces kudriavzevii; Saccharomyces martiniae; Saccharomyces mikatae; Saccharomyces monacensis; Saccharomyces norbensis; Saccharomyces paradoxus; Saccharomyces pastorianus; Saccharomyces spencerorum; Saccharomyces turicensis; Saccharomyces unisporus; Saccharomyces uvarum; Saccharomyces zonatus

= Saccharomyces =

Genus of fungi

Saccharomyces is a genus of fungi that includes many species of yeasts. The name Saccharomyces is from Greek σάκχαρον ('sugar') and μύκης ('fungus') and means sugar fungus. Many members of this genus are considered very important in food production where they are known as brewer's yeast, baker's yeast and sourdough starter among others. They are unicellular and saprotrophic fungi. One example is Saccharomyces cerevisiae, which is used in making bread, wine, and beer, and for human and animal health. Other members of this genus include the wild yeast Saccharomyces paradoxus that is the closest relative to S. cerevisiae, Saccharomyces bayanus, used in making wine, and Saccharomyces cerevisiae var. boulardii, used in medicine.

== Morphology ==
Colonies of Saccharomyces grow rapidly and mature in three days. They are flat, smooth, moist, glistening or dull, and cream in color. The inability to use nitrate and ability to ferment various carbohydrates are typical characteristics of Saccharomyces.

=== Cellular morphology ===
Generally, they have a diameter of 2–8 μm and length of 3–25 μm. Blastoconidia (cell buds) are observed. They are unicellular, globose, and ellipsoid to elongate in shape. Multilateral (multipolar) budding is typical. Pseudohyphae, if present, are rudimentary. Hyphae are absent.

Saccharomyces produces ascospores, especially when grown on V-8 medium, acetate ascospor agar, or Gorodkowa medium. These ascospores are globose and located in asci. Each ascus contains 1–4 ascospores. Asci do not rupture at maturity. Ascospores are stained with Kinyoun stain and ascospore stain. When stained with Gram stain, ascospores appear Gram-negative, while vegetative cells appear Gram-positive.

== History ==
The presence of yeast in beer was first suggested in 1680, although the genus was not named Saccharomyces until 1837. It was not until 1876 that Louis Pasteur demonstrated the involvement of living organisms in fermentation and in 1883, Emil C. Hansen isolated brewing yeast and propagated the culture, leading to the discovery of the importance of yeast in brewing. The use of microscopes for the study of yeast morphology and purity was crucial to understanding their functionality.

== Use in brewing ==
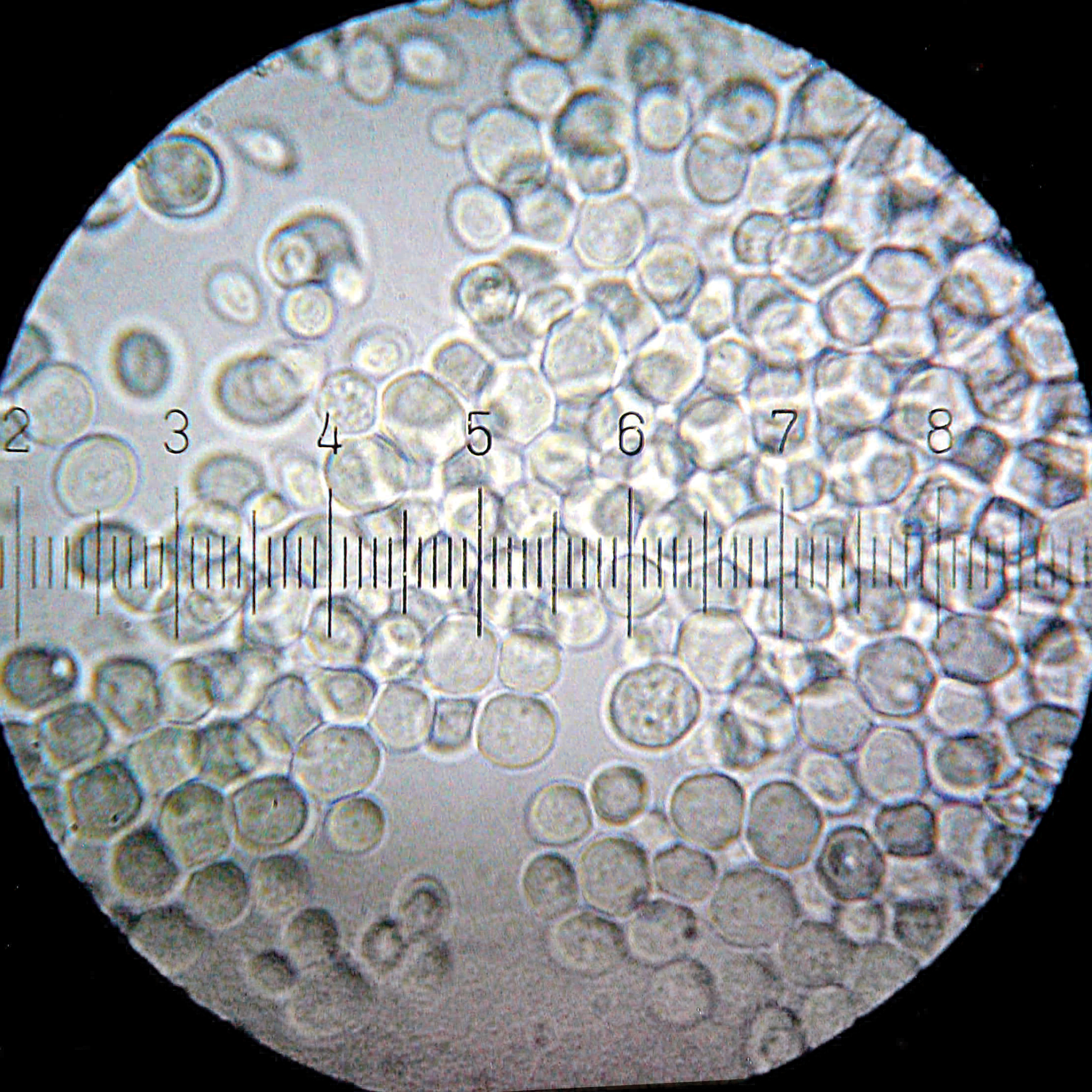
Saccharomyces cerevisiae—the yeast most used for brewing and baking. Numbered ticks are 10 micrometres apart.

Brewing yeasts are polyploid and belong to the genus Saccharomyces. The brewing strains can be classified into two groups; the ale strains (Saccharomyces cerevisiae) and the lager strains (Saccharomyces pastorianus or Saccharomyces carlsbergensis in the old taxonomy). Lager strains are a hybrid strain of S. cerevisiae and S. eubayanus and are often referred to as bottom fermenting. In contrast, ale strains are referred to as top fermenting strains, reflecting their separation characteristics in open square fermenters. Although the two species differ in a number of ways, including their response to temperature, sugar transport and use, the S. pastorianus and S. cerevisiae species are closely related within the genus Saccharomyces.

Saccharomyces yeasts can form symbiotic matrices with bacteria, and are used to produce kombucha, kefir and ginger beer.
Saccharomyces fragilis, for example, is part of kefir cultures and is being grown on the lactose contained in whey (as a byproduct in cheesemaking) to be used as animal fodder itself.

== Pathology ==
Saccharomyces cause food spoilage of sugar-rich foods, such as maple sap, syrup, concentrated juices and condiments.

Case report suggest extended exposure to S. cerevisiae can cause hypersensitivity in humans.

== See also ==
- Mating of yeast
- Saccharomyces cerevisiae virus L-A
- Schizosaccharomyces pombe (fission yeast)
