= Saccharomyces uvarum =

Scientific classification
- Kingdom: Fungi
- Division: Ascomycota
- Subdivision: Saccharomycotina
- Class: Saccharomycetes
- Order: Saccharomycetales
- Family: Saccharomycetaceae
- Genus: Saccharomyces
- Species: S. uvarum

Binomial name
- Saccharomyces uvarum Nguyen & Gaillardin ex. Beijerinck

Type strain
- CBS 395

Synonyms
- Saccaromyces bayanus var. uvarum

Species of fungus

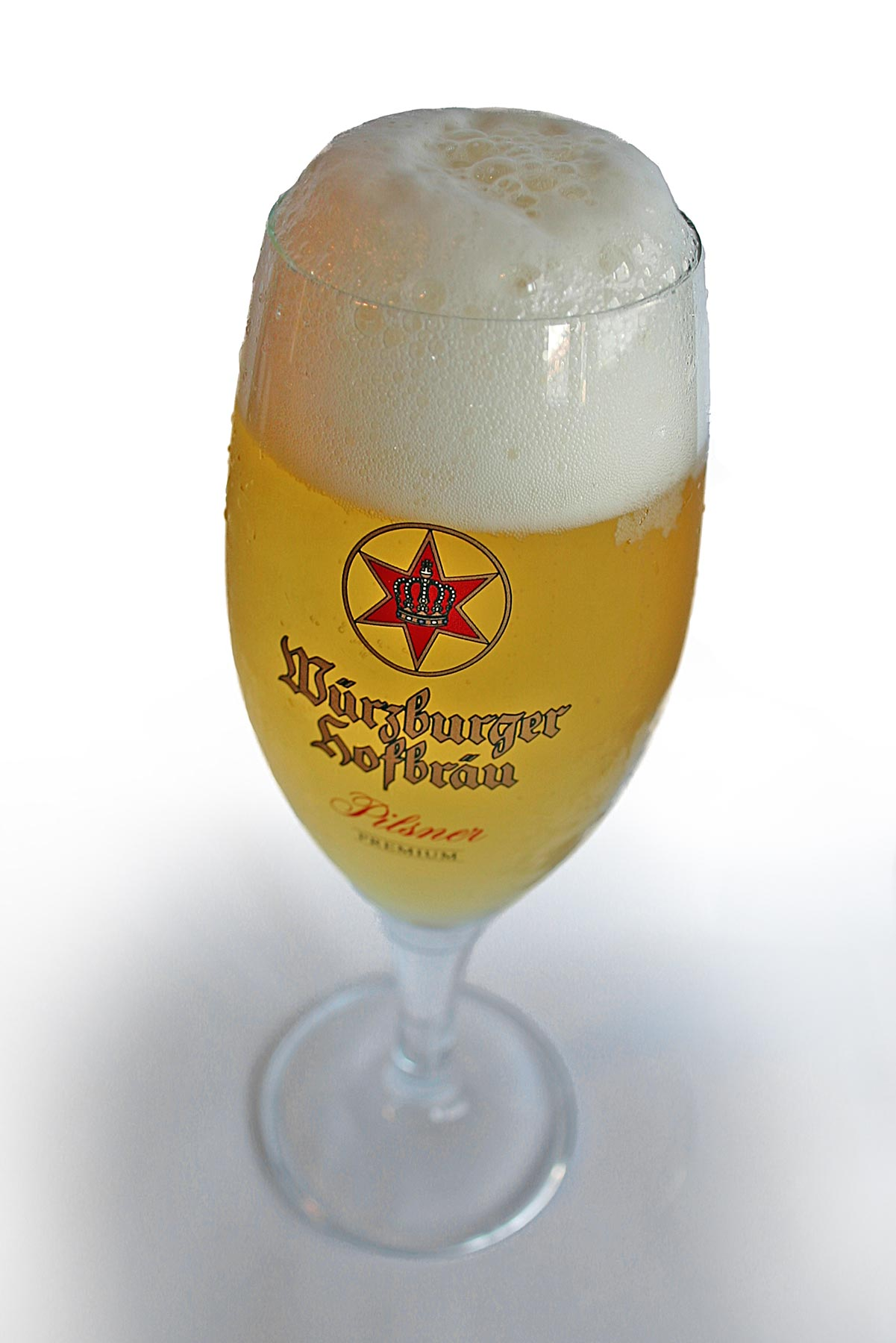
Glass of German "Würzburger Hofbräu" beer

Saccharomyces uvarum is a species of yeast that is commonly found in fermented beverages, particularly those fermented at colder temperatures. It is found in cider (fruit), wine (grape), and beer (cereal)-brewing locations as well as on oak tree barks in nature. It was originally described by Martinus Willem Beijerinck in 1898, but was long considered identical to S. bayanus. In 2000 and 2005, genetic investigations of various Saccharomyces species indicated that S. uvarum is genetically distinct from S. bayanus and should be considered a unique species.

It is a bottom-fermenting yeast, so-called because it does not form the foam on top of the wort that top-fermenting yeast does.

Several genomes are available for S. uvarum, a recent one being a long read sequence of the strain CBS 7001, a more fertile relative of the type strain CBS 395. Each haploid genome includes 16 chromosomes. Unlike natural strains, human-associated strains show introgression from S. eubayanus and S. kudriavzevii. There has been multiple independent hybridization events with S. eubayanus and subsequent backcrossing in collected strains. Yeasts with high S. eubayanus and S. uvarum are considered undesired producers of off-flavors in beer-brewing partly due to 4-vinyl guaiacol production.
