= RRNA endonuclease =

Identifiers
- EC no.: 4.6.1.23
- CAS no.: 1407-48-3

Databases
- IntEnz: IntEnz view
- BRENDA: BRENDA entry
- ExPASy: NiceZyme view
- KEGG: KEGG entry
- MetaCyc: metabolic pathway
- PRIAM: profile
- PDB structures: RCSB PDB PDBe PDBsum
Search
- PMC: articles
- PubMed: articles
- NCBI: proteins

rRNA endonuclease (EC 4.6.1.23, alpha-sarcin) is an enzyme that catalyses the hydrolysis of the phosphodiester linkage between guanosine and adenosine residues at one specific position in the 28S rRNA of rat ribosomes. This ribotoxin also acts on bacterial rRNA.

A ribosome-inactivating protein produced by the mold Aspergillus giganteus, alpha-sarcin cleaves the portion of ribosomal RNA that forms the small ribosomal substrate. The high specificity of alpha-sarcin and its efficiency of cleavage are point of study and also account for this protein's very high toxicity level.

== Structure ==
It is believed that the tyrosine amino acid found along the amino acid sequence of alpha-sarcin allows for the specificity when alpha-sarcin binds to the rRNA. It is the alcohol group found on the tyrosine amino acid that allows for this binding. This was determined in tests that removed the alcohol group, replacing tyrosine with phenylalanine, and the binding affinity was greatly reduced. The region of the DNA that makes alpha-sarcin is highly conserved, along with the corresponding sequence on the targeted ribosome. The corresponding sequence on the targeted ribosome is a centered around a guanine nucleotide located on what is called the "bulged-G motif".

== Specificity ==
Alpha-sarcin is remarkable in its cleavage specificity. It interacts with a single bond in the targeted ribosome and breaks it, causing the ribosome to be inactivated. The bond in question is the phosphodiester bond within the sarcin/ricin loop (SRL) of the rRNA. The SRL region of the RNA was named after the alpha-sarcin toxin that targets it. The targeted bond is located within the GAGA tetraloop of the RNA in between a guanine and adenine nucleotide. Other ribotoxins also cleave the RNA of the ribosomes, however there are many more points of cleavage- indicating much less specificity.

The specificity of alpha-sarcin is so high, that alpha-sarcin can recognize the SRL segment of the ribosome without the rest of the ribosome present. SRLs fold independently, creating the same structure as when they are in a ribosome. This reaffirms the idea that it is the affinity of alpha-sarcin for this specific region of the ribosome that causes the two to bind and react. The key recognition nucleotide on the ribosome is a guanine nucleotide located six nucleotides upstream from the cleave site (this is the same as the above-mentioned "g-bulge" region).

== Conditions for reaction ==
The conditions that allow for the recognition and cleavage include the salinity of the environment. With increased salt concentration, there is increased competition for the alpha-sarcin to reach the "G-bulge". This is due to the electrostatic interactions between the cationic side chains of the amino acids of the alpha-sarcin and the phosphates of the ribosome chain. More salt interferes with these two interactions.

The overall rate constant for the SRL cleavage reaction is second order (k2/K1/2 of 108M-1s-1). This means the reaction rate is directly proportional to the concentrations of the reactant squared. The rate does not appear to be dependent on physical steps, i.e. the two molecules being able to locate each other in solution is not a factor in how quickly they react. This was determined by observing the rate of the reaction under varying viscosities. The dissociation of the products, the separation of the two molecules, also has no effect on the rate. It is suggested that the rate determining step for SRL cleaves occurs within the chemical cleavage of the phosphodiester bond.

Once the alpha-sarcin have cleaved the ribosome, the resulting pieces, P1 and P2 are cleaved further, with a particular affinity towards A and G sites. However, this later cleaving has a much lower rate of reaction.4 This further supports the notion that alpha-sarcin depends on the folded structure of the RNA for recognition and cleavage, but not necessarily the rest of the molecule. The cleavage rate for an unfolded ssRNA containing the GA sequence is three times less than the full and folded SRL sequence.
