= Aspergillus fischeri =

Scientific classification
- Kingdom: Fungi
- Division: Ascomycota
- Class: Eurotiomycetes
- Order: Eurotiales
- Family: Aspergillaceae
- Genus: Aspergillus
- Species: A. fischeri

Binomial name
- Aspergillus fischeri Wehmer, 1905

Species of fungus

Aspergillus fischeri is a species of fungus in the genus Aspergillus. Nyosartorya fischeri is the taxonomic term for A. fischer in its teleomorph phase. It is widely distributed in soil throughout the world. It is a plant pathogen but does not require a high level of biosecurity. A. fischeri has been reported as a causative agent in aspergillosis. It is also a common factor in food spoilage. However, its utility in biodegradation of plastic waste, production of aromatic compounds, drug repurposing and cytotoxic potential are potential benefits.

== Taxonomy ==
A. fischeri was thought to be one of the 64% of species in the aspergillus genus which are unable to undergo sexual reproduction. The name for these species, as a group, is fungi imperfecti.

However, when it was found that A. fischeri did have a sexual stage of reproduction, the taxonomy was changed to a teleomorph name, that is, Neosartorya fischeri.

A. fischeri can be distinguished from similar fungi through sequence analysis of the beta-tubulin, calmodulin and actin genes.

== Morphology ==
The surface of colonies of A. fischeri vary from suede-like to woolly (floccose) and from white to pale yellow in colour. The asexual fruiting bodies (conidial heads) are short, columnar and arranged in a single layer (uniseriate). The conidiophore striations (stripes on the stalk) are smooth-walled and the vesicles (the cone-shaped swellings at the ends of the stalks) are usually sub-globose (less than spherical) to flask-shaped. The spores (conidia) are sub-globose (2-2.5 µm in diameter) and are smooth to finely roughened.

== Reproduction ==
The reproduction of A. fischeri can be divided into three forms: sexual, asexual and parasexual. Occasionally, hyphae from two different individuals will fuse. This is the precipitant of the parasexual form of reproduction.

A. Fischeri is also described as homothallic. This means each individual has the genetic matter of both sexual types and so is able to reproduce without the presence of another distinct individual.

== Pathogenicity ==
A. fumigatus is the most common pathogen in the cause of the human pulmonary disease, invasive aspergillosis. A. Fischeri is a member of the Aspergillus fumigatus complex. The complex is a group of species very closely related to A. fumigatus.

The pathogenicity of organisms of the A. fumigatus complex is determined in large part by the expression of various genes. These genes control factors such as the ability of the organism to grow at human body temperatures; and the ability of the organism to form biofilms among others.

Species within the A. fumigatus complex have different strains. Some strains, including those of A. fischeri express pathogenic factor genes as much as A.fumigatus and thus may cause invasive aspergillosis. Occurring sporadically, A. fischeri is now a recognised cause of disease in immunosuppressed patients.

== Uses ==
=== Biodegradation of plastic waste ===
A number of fungi are able to degrade plastics. In the fungus taxonomy, the phyla that degrade plastics include Ascomycota, Basidiomycota and Mucoromycota. Within Ascomycota, the class Eurotiomycetes contain the largest number of plastic degraders. A. fischeri is a species within this class. A. fischeri is able to degrade the polymer polycaprolactone. This happens through the release of fungal lipase.

=== Fungal cell factories ===
By convention, aromatic compounds are derived from petroleum. However, fungi including A. Fischeri are able to produce aromatic compounds by breaking down lignin. Lignin is the organic polymer that is part of the supporting structure of vascular plants. Aspergillus and other fungi can then metabolize aromatic compounds. The upscaling of this process to "cell factories" may help to decrease the use of fossil fuel.

For example, A. fischeri has been studied in the manufacturing of Gallic acid. Gallic acid is found in plants either as a free molecule or as part of the tannic acid molecule. It is used in photography, inks and dyes, manufacturing of the antibiotic trimethoprim. It also has antioxidant and cytotoxic activity.

Indore researchers, Bajpai and Patil used a growth medium containing tannic acid from gall nuts and A. fischeri to produce via fermentation a bioconversion to gallic acid at 0.56 g per litre of medium per hour.

=== Drug repurposing ===
Drug resistance is a significant problem in treating patients with invasive Candida albicans infections. Fungi produce many different secondary metabolites, substances not necessary for survival but which affect the organism's environment. These metabolites may be incorporated into a known drug to strengthen the drug's effect on C. albicans. For example, A. fischeri produces an antifungal protein (NFAP2). NFAP2 recognizes and binds particular intracellular proteins in C. albicans.

=== Cytotoxic action ===
A. fischeri may be useful in treating cancer. For example, creating a microbiological culture of strains of A. fischeri and another fungus, Xylaria flabelliformis produces a number of metabolites. One of these, called Wheldone has cyctotoxic action against breast, melanoma, and ovarian cancer cell lines.

== Deleterious effects ==
=== Food spoilage ===
A. fischeri , like many fungi, is a cause of food spoilage. This is due to its heat resistance among other factors. A. fischeri can grow at 50 degrees celsius. The heat resistance part of the fungus is the ascospore. Food affected by A. fischeri spoilage include fruit juice, and tinned strawberries. A. fischeri has also been found in spoiled dairy products such as cream cheese.
