= Fungal ribotoxin =

Group of extracellular ribonucleases secreted by fungi

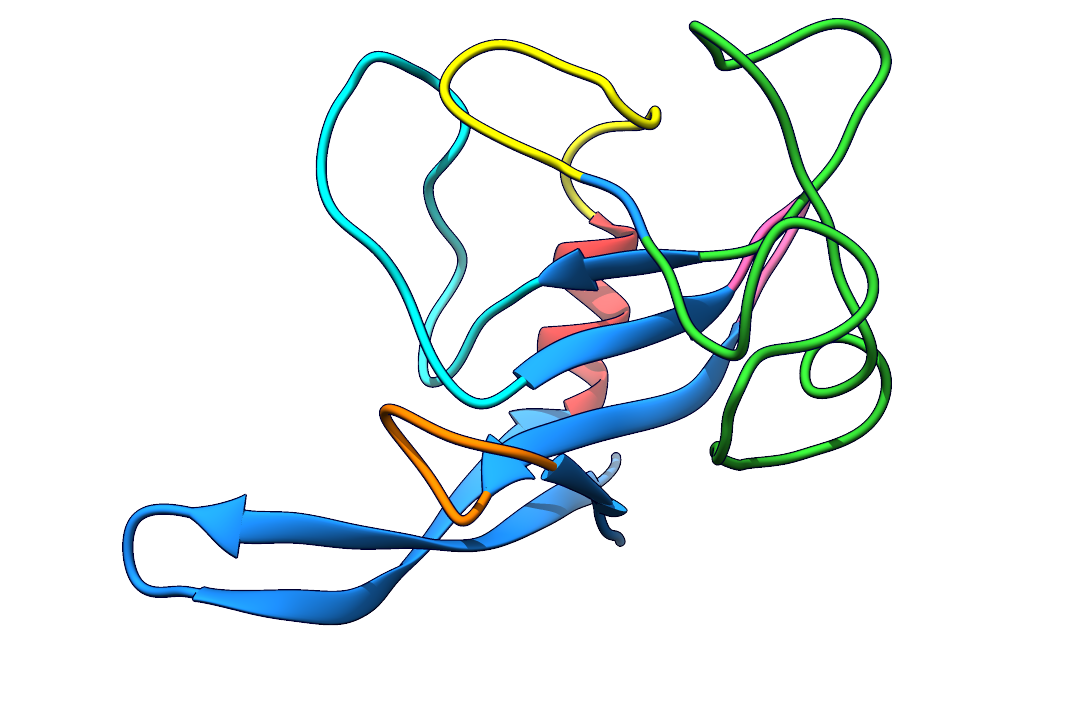
Three-dimensiona structure of α-sarcin (PDB: 1DE3), a fungal ribotoxin produced by Aspergillus giganteus

Fungal ribotoxins are a group of extracellular ribonucleases (RNases) secreted by fungi. Their most notable characteristic is their extraordinary specificity. They inactivate ribosomes by cutting a single phosphodiester bond of the rRNA that is found in a universally conserved sequence. This cleavage leads to cell death by apoptosis. However, since they are extracellular proteins, they must first enter the cells that constitute their target to exert their cytotoxic action. This entry constitutes the rate-determining step of their action.

No protein receptor has been found. Thus, in order to penetrate the cells, they must take advantage of changes in permeability and the biophysical properties of the membranes, produced by phenomena such as tumour transformation or a viral infection. This is why α-sarcin, the most representative member of the group, was originally discovered as an antitumoural agent. However, it turned out not to be as safe as needed and the research in this field was temporarily abandoned. One of the determining factors in this process of entry into cells appears to be their ability to interact with phospholipids whose polar headgroup shows a net negative electrical charge.

Today it is known that ribotoxins constitute a broad family, produced by many types of fungi, with common characteristics that make them optimal candidates to be used for biotechnological purposes, such as pest control, and for the development of anti-cancer drugs in the form of immunotoxins.

== Distribution ==
Ribotoxins have been detected in many different fungi, including entomopathogenic and edible species, but the three-dimensional structure has only been resolved for three of them: α-sarcin, restrictocin, and hirsutellin A (HtA). The first two, produced by Aspergillus giganteus and Aspergillus restrictus, respectively, are nearly identical. HtA, produced by the entomopathogenic fungus Hirsutella thompsonii, is much smaller and only shows 25% sequence identity with the other larger ribotoxins. Even so, it retains all the functional characteristics of the family. A second ribotoxin similar to HtA, anisoplin, is known (70% sequence identity). It is produced by the fungus Metarhizium anisopliae, another insect pathogen.

== Structural features ==
All known ribotoxins are proteins of between 130 and 150 amino acids that share at least two different elements of ordered secondary structure: a β-sheet, where the active center is located, and a short α-helix. The structural arrangement is very similar to that of other extracellular fungal RNases, which are not toxic, and constitute a family whose best known representative is the RNase T1 of Aspergillus oryzae. This explains why ribotoxins are considered the toxic representatives of the group. The observation of their three-dimensional structures reveals their functional differences in terms of toxicity, since ribotoxins present unordered, positively charged long loops, which are much shorter, and negatively charged, in their non-toxic "relatives". These ribotoxin bonds are responsible for recognition of both the negatively charged acid phospholipids that facilitate their entry into cells, and the ribosome-specific features that allow them to cause inactivation.

== Enzymatic mechanism ==
Ribotoxins cleave RNA following a general acid-base mechanism shared by all the extracellular fungal RNases so far characterized, regardless of their toxicity. Using dinucleotides, such as GpA, it has been demonstrated that the breakage of the phosphodiester bond 3′-5′ of the substrate takes place through the formation of a cyclic intermediate that becomes the corresponding derivative 3′-monophosphate, the final product of the reaction. It is a transphosphorylation reaction, followed by the hydrolysis of this cyclic intermediate. For this reason, these proteins are knows as cyclant RNases.

== Sarcin/ricin loop (SRL) ==
Ribotoxins specifically cut a single phosphodiester bond within the preserved sequence found in the sarcin/ricin loop (SRL). It is a segment of rRNA that adopts a loop structure. It is known as SRL precisely because it is the target of both α-sarcin and ricin. Ricin is the best known representative of the ribosomal inactivating protein (RIP) family. RIPs are also highly specialized toxic proteins produced by plants and fungi that inactivate ribosomes acting as N-glycosidases. Its target is found in the same singular structure of the rRNA that is attacked by ribotoxins. They also depurinate a single nucleotide, contiguous to the phosphodiester bond that constitutes the target of the ribotoxins, producing the same inactivating effect of the ribosome. According to this criterion, ribotoxins are also RIPs. However, there is a fairly general consensus to use this name only for plant N-glycosidases, whereas the term ribotoxins refers only to toxic fungal RNases.

In both cases, both ribotoxins and RIPs produce complete inactivation of the ribosome by causing the SRL loop to be unable to interact with the elongation factors of the translation. It has been precisely determined, using E. coli, that the binding of the elongation factor G (EF-G) is the most disturbed event by the catalytic action of these toxins.

The positively charged ribotoxin surface allows them to establish favourable electrostatic interactions between the residues of their active site and the rRNA, explaining why they can carry out this highly specific recognition of the SRL.

== Role of biological membranes ==
The toxicity of ribotoxins results from the combination of their specific catalytic activity and their ability to cross lipid membranes. Since no protein receptor has been found, the lipid composition of these membranes is a determining factor of their cytotoxic activity. Using phospholipid model systems it has been demonstrated that α-sarcin is able to bind to lipid vesicles enriched in acid phospholipids, promoting their aggregation, leading to fusion, and altering their permeability. This allows the protein to be translocated through certain lipid bilayers in absence of any other protein. The outer leaflet of cancer cell membranes appears to be enriched with negatively charged phospholipids, which seems to explain the antitumor properties of ribotoxins.

== Biological function in the wild ==
It is not clear why some fungi secrete ribotoxins. At least in the case of Aspergillus, it appears that they occur during the maturation of conidia, most likely as a defense mechanism against predators. The discovery that the entomopathogenic fungus Hirsutella thompsonii synthesized HtA, followed by the recent characterization of anisopline, suggests the possibility that ribotoxins behave as insecticidal proteins. This function has already been tested, using larvae from Galeria mellonella in laboratory experiments, for α-sarcina and some other ribotoxins such as HtA itself.

== Biotechnological and biomedical applications ==
The presumed insecticidal function of ribotoxins enables biotechnological possibilities to use them as a basis for the design of new, environmentally friendly bioinsecticides. In fact, extracts of H. thompsonii and M. anisopliae are marketed as pest control agents for different crops, although it is not yet known if their effect is due to the presence of ribotoxins. However, ribotoxins could be used, either independently or as part of bio-pesticide formulations, and this would be a more controlled and reproducible product than the complete fungal extract now in use. The potential toxicity of ribotoxins against vertebrates could be overcome by the design of new variants with reduced non-specific toxicity. Their combination with insect pathogenic viruses, such as some baculoviruses, represents another promising approach to this biological control. Natural baculoviruses are already used as effective biopesticides, but their genetic modification to supply ribotoxins could be an effective and safe alternative for pest control.

Interest in ribotoxins has also been revived by the prospect of their use as components of antitumor immunotoxins. These immunotoxins are chimeric molecules composed of a fragment of a specific antibody, responsible for targeting a surface antigen present only in certain tumor cells, fused with a ribotoxin that promotes the death of the recognized cell. These immunotoxin designs based on the use of ribotoxins have been shown to be highly effective, although in laboratory experiments, with mice and tumour cells in culture. They have not yet been tested in humans. The additional benefit of not showing any detectable undesirable side effects, most likely due to the highly specific recognition of the antigen by the antibody used, makes them attractive for the therapeutic treatment of certain solid tumors. This approach has recently been improved with the incorporation of different artificial variants of ribotoxins, such as one that cannot cross the membranes on its own, but retains the ribosome inactivating activity, or a de-immunized version of α-sarcin which, in vitro, has been proven incapable of triggering a T-lymphocyte response. Since the antibody fragment used is humanized, this last construction would then be practically invisible to the immune system, thus increasing the time window of its action.
