= Aspergillus restrictus =

Scientific classification
- Kingdom: Fungi
- Division: Ascomycota
- Class: Eurotiomycetes
- Order: Eurotiales
- Family: Aspergillaceae
- Genus: Aspergillus
- Species: A. restrictus

Binomial name
- Aspergillus restrictus G.Sm. (1931)

Synonyms
- Penicillium fuscoflavum S.Abe (1956); Aspergillus restrictus var. B G.Sm (1931)

Species of fungus

Aspergillus restrictus is a species of fungus in the genus Aspergillus. It is from the Restricti section. The species was first described in 1931. It is xerophilic, frequently found in house dust. Studies have suggested that it is an allergen implicated in asthma. In 2016, the genome of A. restrictus was sequenced as a part of the Aspergillus whole-genome sequencing project - a project dedicated to performing whole-genome sequencing of all members of the genus Aspergillus. The genome assembly size was 23.26 Mbp.

== Growth and morphology ==
A. restrictus has been cultivated on both Czapek yeast extract agar (CYA) plates and Malt Extract Agar Oxoid (MEAOX) plates. The growth morphology of the colonies can be seen in the pictures below.

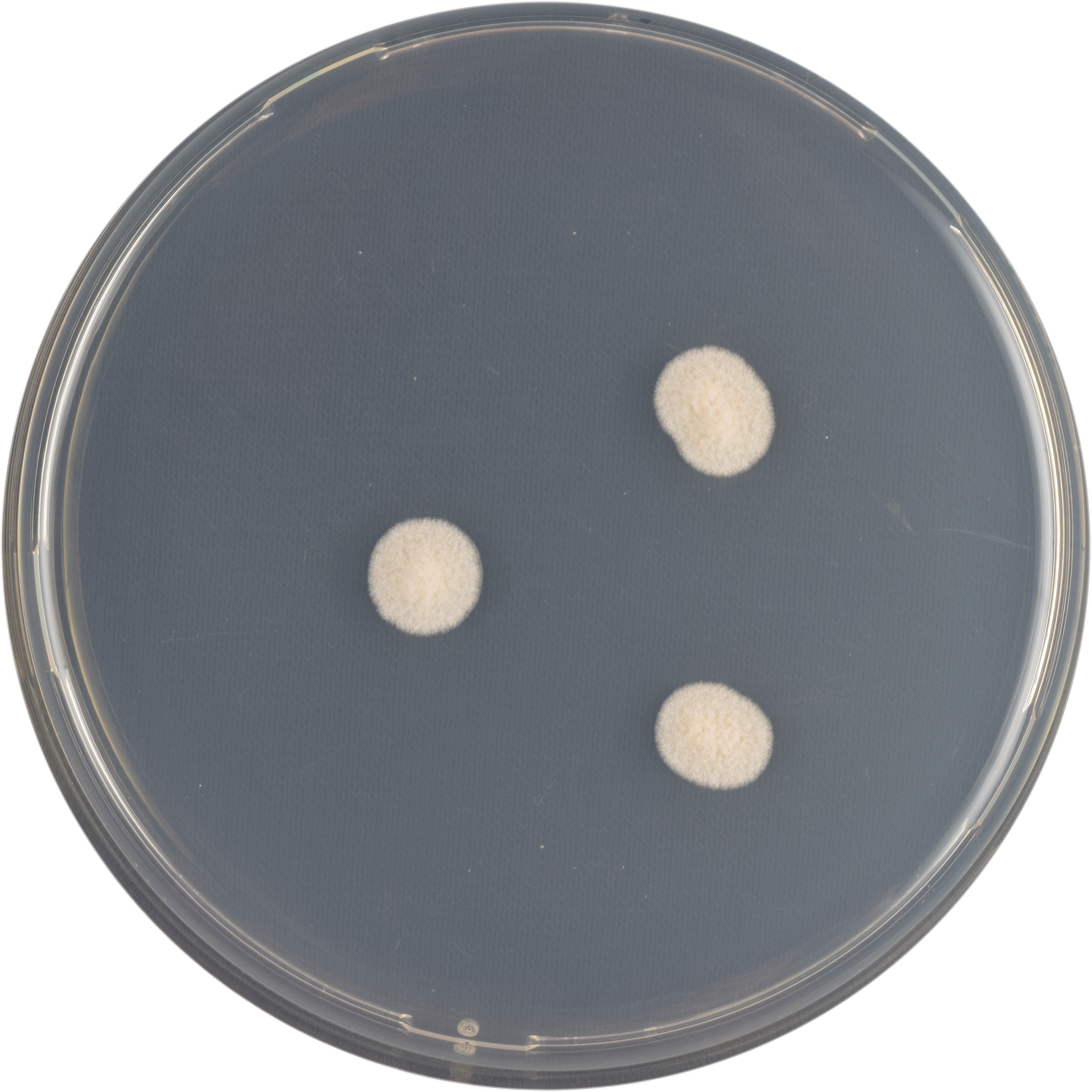
Aspergillus restrictus growing on CYA plate

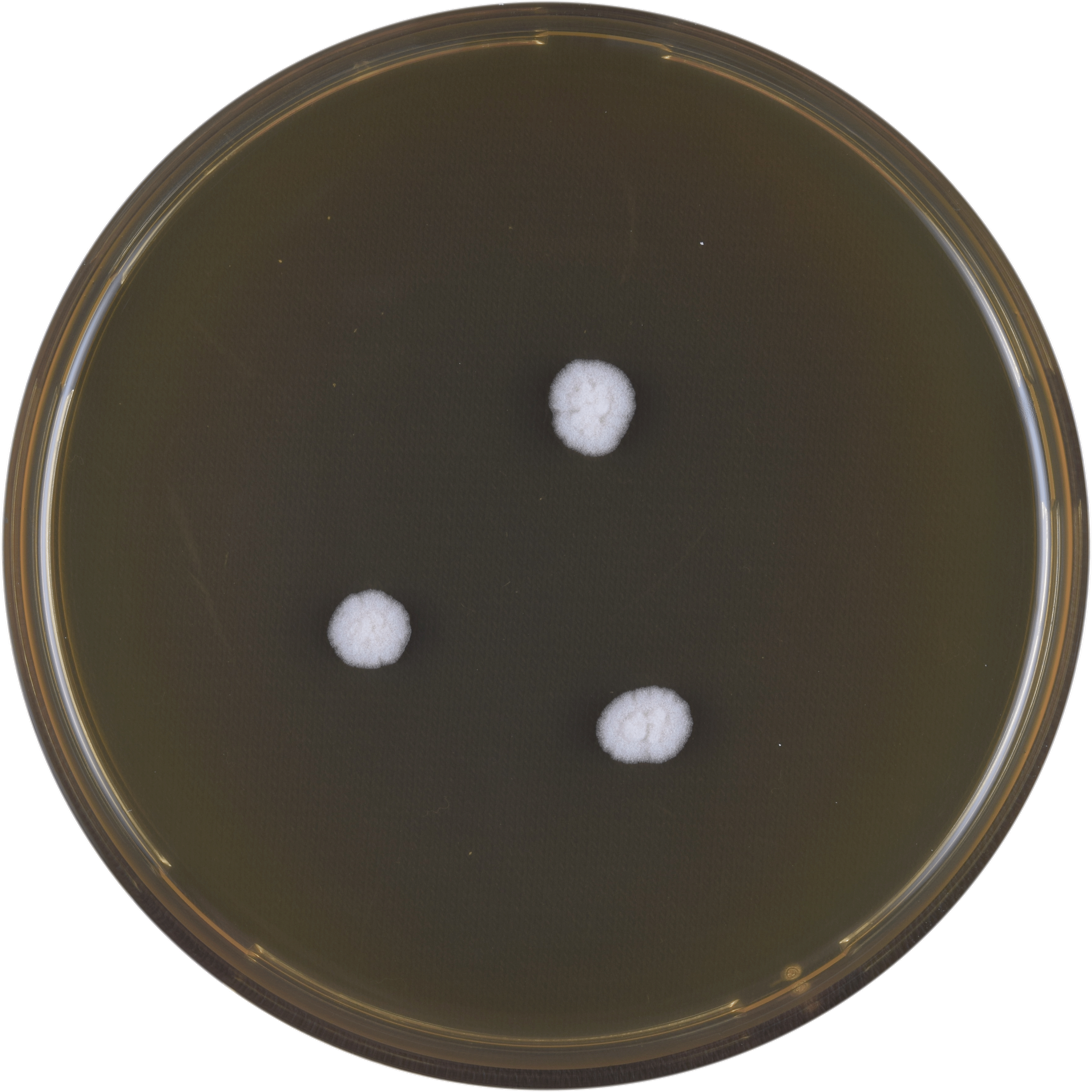
Aspergillus restrictus growing on MEAOX plate
