= Harold Raistrick =

British biochemist (1890–1971)

Harold Raistrick (26 November 1890 – 8 March 1971) was a British biochemist, Fellow of the Royal Society, and recipient of the Bakerian Medial. In the 1920s, Raistrick worked as a researcher for Imperial Chemical Industries and later directed the Division of Biochemistry and Chemistry at the London School of Hygiene and Tropical Medicine. Over the course of his career, Raistrick was "involved in the discovery of many of the most important classes of fungal metabolites during the 20th century."

== Career and education ==
Raistrick was born in Pudsey, Yorkshire, to Mark Walker Raistrick and Bertha Anne Raistrick (née Galloway). He was one of four children, including an older brother who died in infancy.

Raistrick attended Leeds University from 1908 to 1912, earning a BSc degree in Chemistry and Associateship of the Institute of Chemistry in Branch E. He earned an MSc degree in 1913. Originally intended to spend time in the laboratory of Emil Fischer in Berlin, Raistrick, who was ineligible to serve during the First World War due to a physical impairment, instead went to study in Cambridge. There he worked under F. Gowland Hopkins studying microbial biochemistry until 1920. During this period, Raistrick was also involved in then-confidential research for the government, in collaboration with Dorothy Jordan Lloyd, on acetone-butanol fermentation, which was valuable as an alternative method for producing acetone for explosives. In 1920, he received a D.Sc. degree from Leeds for the research he had conducted in Cambridge.

In 1921, Raistrick was hired to lead a newly formed department of applied biochemistry for Nobel's Explosives Company, where he continued research into the production of useful chemicals by fermentation. After leaving I.C.I. in 1929, Raistrick moved to the London School of Hygiene and Tropical Medicine as the University Chair of Biochemistry, where he remained until his retirement in 1956. Collaborating widely with scholars on a number of questions, especially studies of fungal metabolism, Raistrick played a prominent role in experimental studies, with George Smith, about how to protect military equipment from deterioration in tropical environments during World War II. He also worked to produce penicillin in industrial quantities, serving as a scientific adviser to the Ministry of Supply on Penicillin Production and a member of their General Penicillin Committee.

== Personal life ==
Raistrick married Martha Louisa Coates, of Pudsey, in 1917. They had two children, Eleanor Ruth and Audrey Kathleen, who both took up medical careers. After Martha Louisa died in 1945, Raistrick married his second wife, Betty Helen Young, in 1947.
