= Aspergillus lentulus =

Scientific classification
- Kingdom: Fungi
- Division: Ascomycota
- Class: Eurotiomycetes
- Order: Eurotiales
- Family: Aspergillaceae
- Genus: Aspergillus
- Species: A. lentulus

Binomial name
- Aspergillus lentulus Balajee & K.A.Marr (2005)

Species of fungus

Aspergillus lentulus is a species of Aspergillus fungus. It is a close relative of Aspergillus fumigatus. It has smaller conidial heads with diminutive vesicles compared to A. fumigatus, and cannot survive at 48 °C (118 °F). It also has decreased in vitro susceptibilities to multiple antifungals, including amphotericin B, itraconazole, voriconazole, and caspofungin. Aspergillus lentulus is an opportunistic human pathogen that causes invasive aspergillosis with high mortality rates. It has been isolated from clinical and environmental sources. Since it was described in 2005 as a new species, it was thought to reproduce only asexually. However, in 2013 Swilaiman et al. (2013) found that A. lentulus has a functional sexual cycle. During this cycle cleistothecia are produced that, when mature, contain heat-resistant ascospores.

== Growth and morphology ==
A. lentulus has been cultivated on both Czapek yeast extract agar (CYA) plates and Malt Extract Agar Oxoid (MEAOX) plates. The growth morphology of the colonies can be seen in the pictures below.

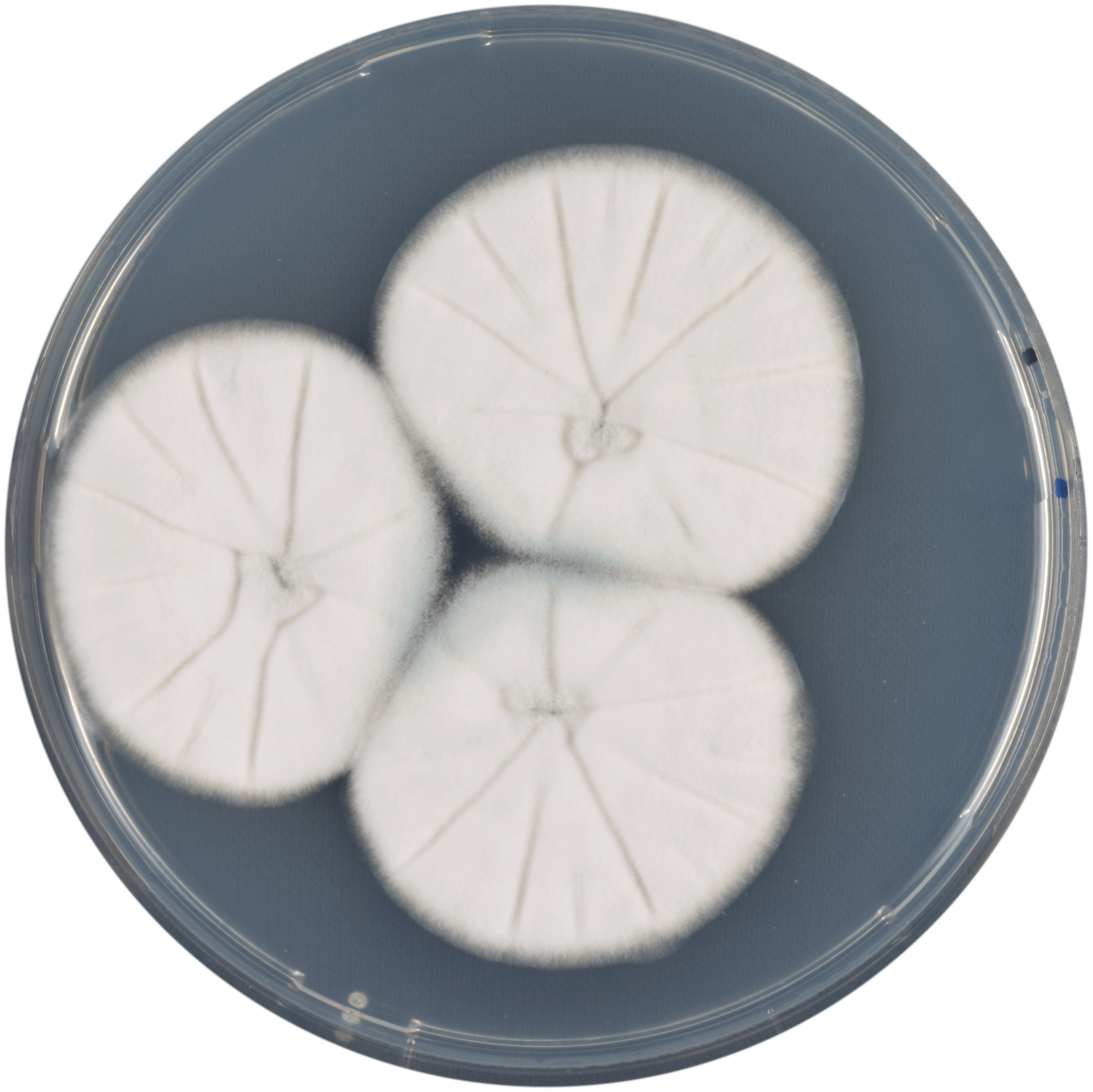
Aspergillus lentulus growing on CYA plate

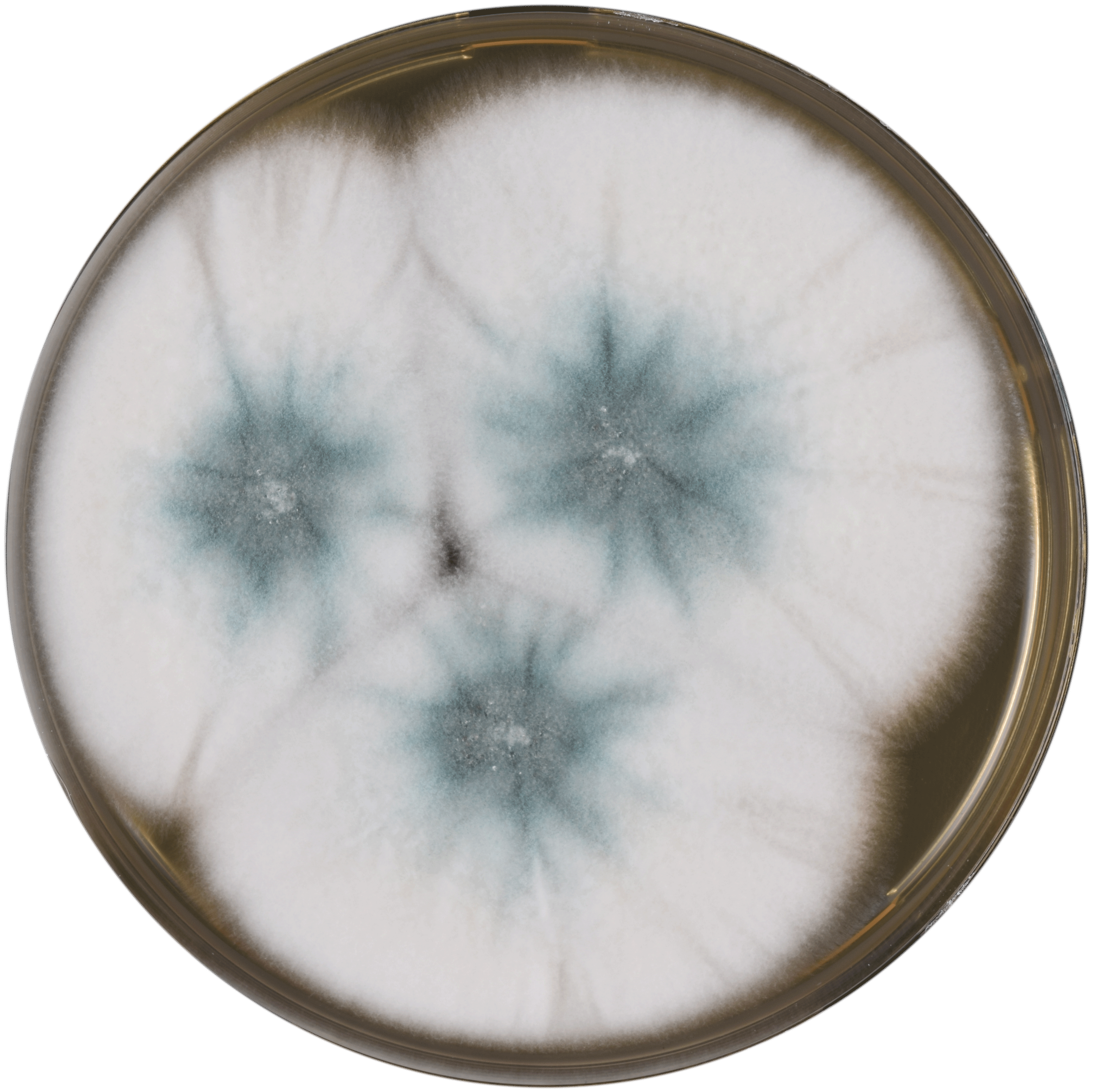
Aspergillus lentulus growing on MEAOX plate
