= Aspergillus clavatonanicus =

Scientific classification
- Kingdom: Fungi
- Division: Ascomycota
- Class: Eurotiomycetes
- Order: Eurotiales
- Family: Aspergillaceae
- Genus: Aspergillus
- Species: A. clavatonanicus

Binomial name
- Aspergillus clavatonanicus Batista, H. Maia & Alecrim (1955)

Species of fungus

Aspergillus clavatonanicus is a species of fungus in the genus Aspergillus. It is from the Clavati section. The species was first described in 1955. A. clavatonanicus has been reported to produce antafumicins, glyanthrypine, kotanins, tryptoquivalines, and tryptoquivalones.
