= George Smith (mycologist) =

British mycologist and botanist (1895–1967)

- Born: 15 December 1895; Great Harwood
- Died: 29 March 1967 (aged 71)
- Known for: Contributions to taxonomy of molds and mildews
- Scientific career
- Fields: Mycology
- Author abbrev. (botany): A.Sm.

George Smith (15 December 1895 – 29 March 1967) was a British mycologist. Born in Great Harwood (Lancashire, England), he graduated from the University of Manchester in 1916 with first-class honours, and received his Master's degree in chemistry two years later. After starting a laboratory with the textile manufacturing company Boardman and Baron Ltd. in 1919, he began to study the mildew and moulds that grew on goods made from cotton.

Smith began employment as a research assistant to Harold Raistrick in 1930 with the Biochemistry Department of the London School of Hygiene & Tropical Medicine, and worked there until his retirement in 1961. He is known for his monographs on the fungal genera Paecilomyces and Scopulariopsis. Smith also wrote a popular textbook, Introduction to Industrial Mycology, first published in 1939, that was reprinted six times. Smith was the President of the British Mycological Society in 1945, and its foray secretary in 1947 and in 1951–52.

== Selected publications ==
=== Articles ===
- Fleming, Alexander; Smith, George (1944). "Some methods for the study of moulds". Transactions of the British Mycological Society. 27 (1–2): 13–19. doi:10.1016/S0007-1536(44)80003-1.
- Smith, George (1946). "Recent Progress in Industrial Mycology". Science Progress (1933- ). 34 (136): 670–680. JSTOR 43421531. PMID 21001963.
- —— (1951). "Some new species of moulds and some new British records". Transactions of the British Mycological Society. 34: 17–IN3. doi:10.1016/S0007-1536(51)80024-X.
- —— (1956). "Some new species of soil moulds". Transactions of the British Mycological Society. 39: 111–114. doi:10.1016/S0007-1536(56)80059-4.
- —— (1957). "Some new and interesting species of micro-fungi". Transactions of the British Mycological Society. 40 (4): 481–448. doi:10.1016/S0007-1536(57)80054-0.
- —— (1961). "Some new and interesting species of micro-fungi. II". Transactions of the British Mycological Society. 44 (1): 42–50. doi:10.1016/S0007-1536(61)80005-3.
- —— (1961). "Polypaecilum gen.nov". Transactions of the British Mycological Society. 44 (3): 437–440. doi:10.1016/S0007-1536(61)80037-5.
- —— (1962). "Some new and interesting species of micro-fungi. III". Transactions of the British Mycological Society. 45 (3): 387–394. doi:10.1016/S0007-1536(62)80077-1.
- —— (1963). "Some new species of Penicillium, and some observations on the taxonomy of the genus". Transactions of the British Mycological Society. 46 (3): 331–337. doi:10.1016/S0007-1536(63)80024-8.

=== Books and monographs ===
- Smith, George (1938). Introduction to industrial mycology (1st ed.). London: E. Arnold & Co., Ltd. LCCN agr39000553. OCLC 4092001; foreword by Harold Raistrick; xii+302 pages including plates
  - 2nd edition. 1942. 3rd edition. 1946.
  - 4th edition. 1954. LCCN 54003634; xiv+378 pages
  - 5th edition. 1960. LCCN 60003046.
  - 6th edition. New York: Wiley. 1981. ISBN 0713122080. LCCN 72397577; ix+390 pages
- Brown, A.H.S.; Smith, G.S. (1957). "The genus Paecilomyces Bainier and its perfect stage Byssochlamys Westling". Transactions of the British Mycological Society. 40 (1): 17–89. doi:10.1016/s0007-1536(57)80066-7.
- Morton, F.J.; Smith, G. (1963). "The genera Scopulariopsis Bainier, Microascus Zukal, and Doratomyces Corda". Mycological Papers. 86: 1–99.

== Taxa described ==
- Aspergillus brevipes (1952)
- Aspergillus parrulus (1961)
- Aspergillus restrictus (1931)
- Phialophora calyciformis (1962)
- Polypaecilum (1961)

== See also ==
- List of mycologists
