= Aspergillus longivesica =

Scientific classification
- Kingdom: Fungi
- Division: Ascomycota
- Class: Eurotiomycetes
- Order: Eurotiales
- Family: Aspergillaceae
- Genus: Aspergillus
- Species: A. longivesica

Binomial name
- Aspergillus longivesica L.H. Huang & Raper (1971)

Species of fungus

Aspergillus longivesica is a species of fungus in the genus Aspergillus. It is from the Clavati section. The species was first described in 1971 by L.H. Huang and K.B. Raper. A. longivesica has been reported to produce patulin, tryptoquivalones, tryptoquivalines, antafumicins, and pyripyropen.

== Growth and morphology ==
A. longivesica has been cultivated on both Czapek yeast extract agar (CYA) plates and Malt Extract Agar Oxoid (MEAOX) plates. The growth morphology of the colonies can be seen in the pictures below.

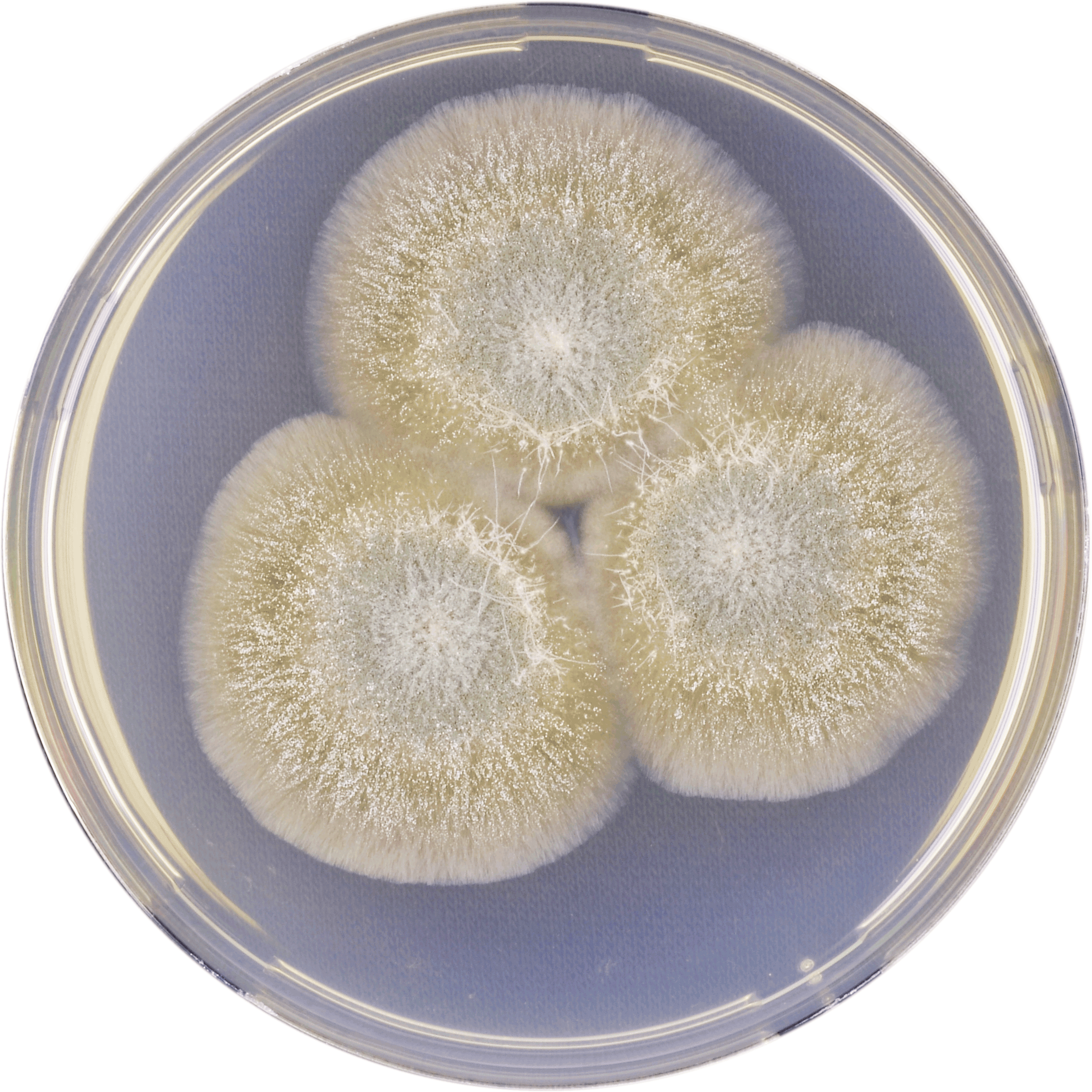
Aspergillus longivesica growing on CYA plate

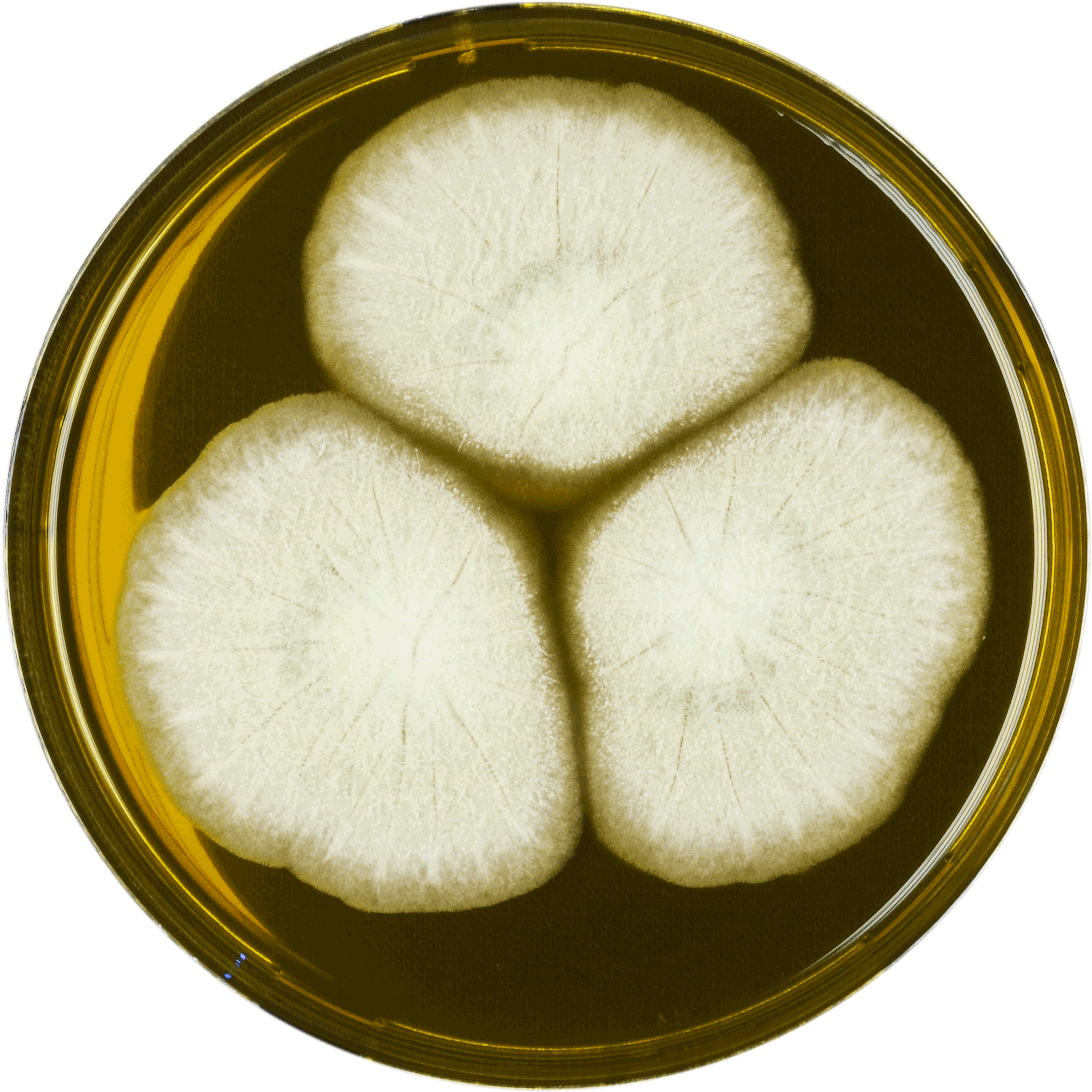
Aspergillus longivesica growing on MEAOX plate
