= Friedrich Ludwig (botanist) =

German botanist (1851–1918)

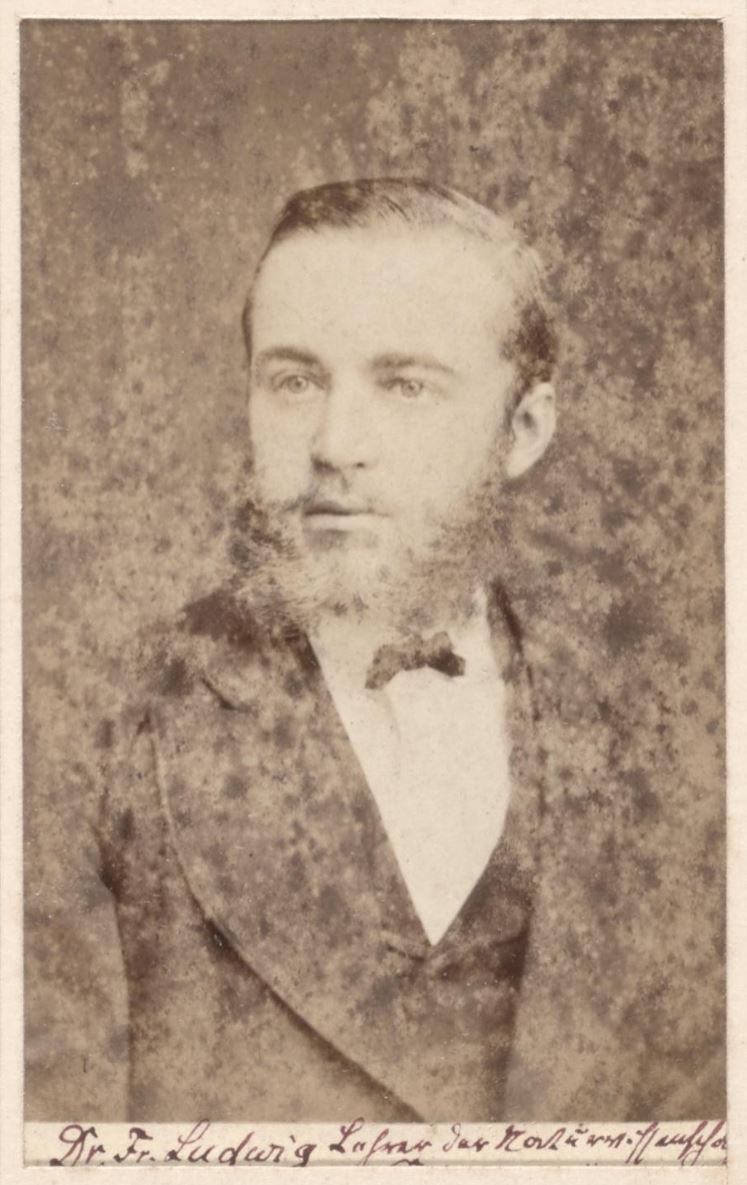
Friedrich Ludwig, 1876

Friedrich Ludwig (24 October 1851 – 1918) was a German botanist. He worked as a teacher and later professor in Greiz, Germany.

Ludwig published Lehrbuch der Biologie der Pflanzen ("Textbook of Plant Biology", 1895), and also Lehrbuch der niederen Crypto vulture, mit besonderer Berücksichtigung derjenigen species, die für den Menschen sind von Bedeutung oder im Haushalte der Natur eine Rolle spielen hervorragende ("Textbook of lower Crypto vulture, play with particular reference to those species that are relevant to humans or the economy of nature an excellent role", 1892) and Die Milbenplage der Wohnungen, ihre Entstehung und Bekämpfung ("The Mite Infestation of Apartments, their Development and Treatment", 1904).
