= Aspergillus rhizopodus =

Scientific classification
- Kingdom: Fungi
- Division: Ascomycota
- Class: Eurotiomycetes
- Order: Eurotiales
- Family: Aspergillaceae
- Genus: Aspergillus
- Species: A. rhizopodus

Binomial name
- Aspergillus rhizopodus J.N. Rai, Wadhwani & S.C. Agarwal (1975)

Species of fungus

Aspergillus rhizopodus is a species of fungus in the genus Aspergillus. It is from the Clavati section. The species was first described in 1975. A. rhizopodus has been reported to produce pseurotins, dehydrocarolic acid, tryptoquivalines, tryptoquivalones, kotanins, and cytochalasins.

== Growth and morphology ==
A. rhizopodus has been cultivated on both Czapek yeast extract agar (CYA) plates and Malt Extract Agar Oxoid® (MEAOX) plates. The growth morphology of the colonies can be seen in the pictures below.

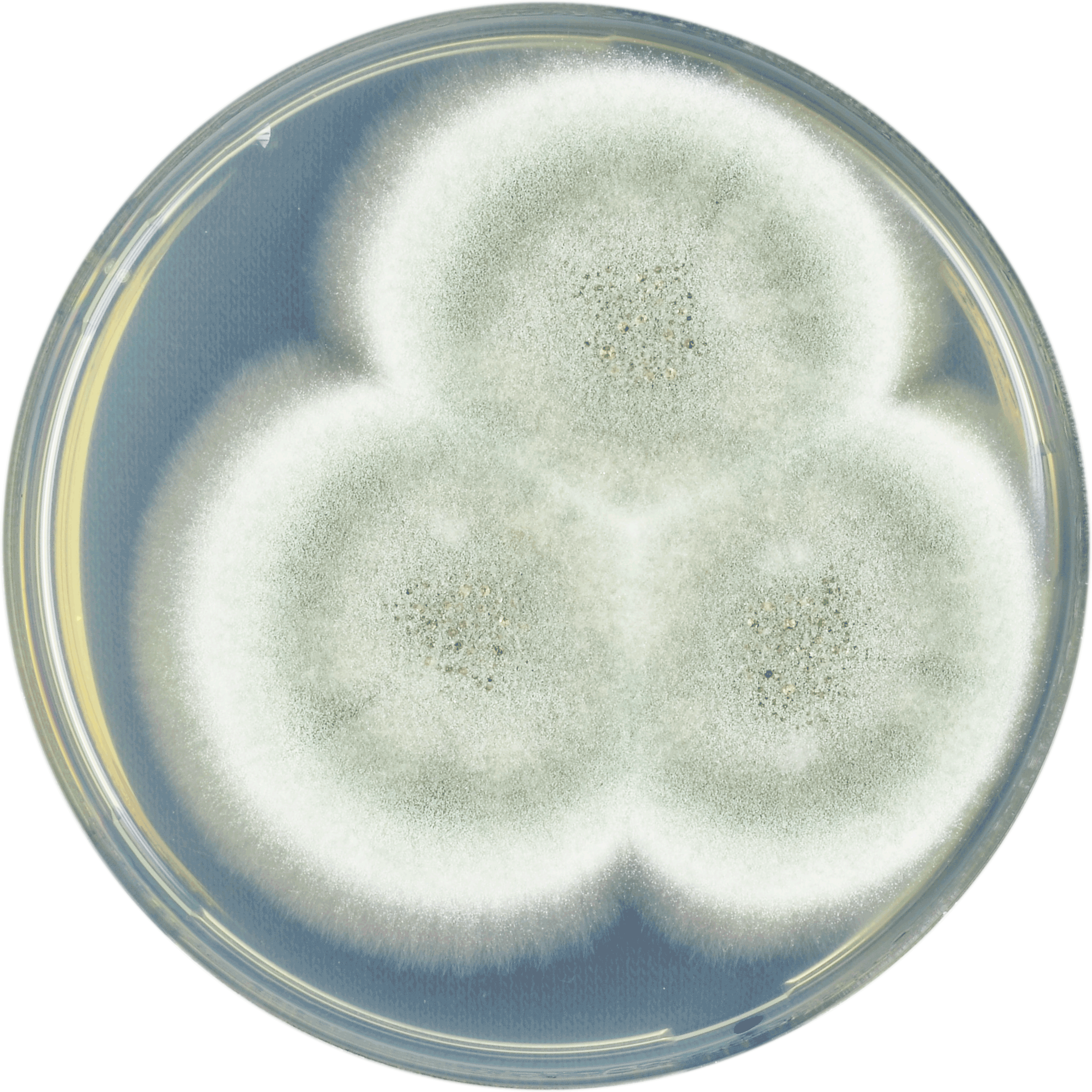
Aspergillus rhizopodus growing on CYA plate

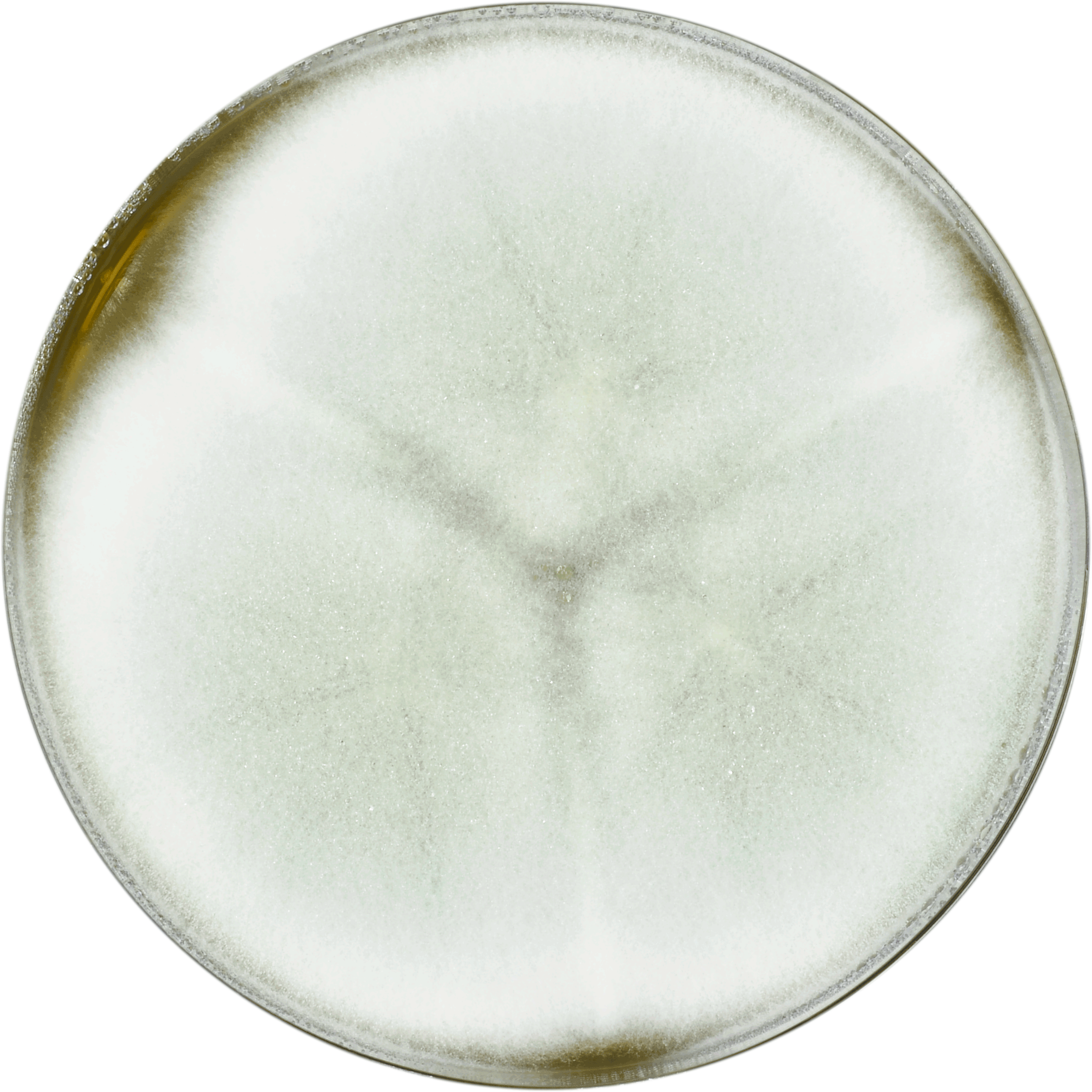
Aspergillus rhizopodus growing on MEAOX plate
