= Parasexual cycle =

Nonsexual mechanism for transferring genetic material without meiosis

The parasexual cycle, a process restricted to fungi and single-celled organisms, is a nonsexual mechanism of parasexuality for transferring genetic material without meiosis or the development of sexual structures. It was first described by Italian geneticist Guido Pontecorvo in 1956 during studies on Aspergillus nidulans (also called Emericella nidulans when referring to its sexual form, or teleomorph). A parasexual cycle is initiated by the fusion of hyphae (anastomosis) during which nuclei and other cytoplasmic components occupy the same cell (heterokaryosis and plasmogamy). Fusion of the unlike nuclei in the cell of the heterokaryon results in formation of a diploid nucleus (karyogamy), which is believed to be unstable and can produce segregants by recombination involving mitotic crossing-over and haploidization. Mitotic crossing-over can lead to the exchange of genes on chromosomes; while haploidization probably involves mitotic nondisjunctions which randomly reassort the chromosomes and result in the production of aneuploid and haploid cells. Like a sexual cycle, parasexuality gives the species the opportunity to recombine the genome and produce new genotypes in their offspring. Unlike a sexual cycle, the process lacks coordination and is exclusively mitotic.

The parasexual cycle resembles sexual reproduction. In both cases, unlike hyphae (or modifications thereof) may fuse (plasmogamy) and their nuclei will occupy the same cell. The unlike nuclei fuse (karyogamy) to form a diploid (zygote) nucleus. In contrast to the sexual cycle, recombination in the parasexual cycle takes place during mitosis followed by haploidization (but without meiosis). The recombined haploid nuclei appear among vegetative cells, which differ genetically from those of the parent mycelium.

Both heterokaryosis and the parasexual cycle are very important for those fungi that have no sexual reproduction. Those cycles provide for somatic variation in the vegetative phase of their life cycles. This is also true for fungi where the sexual phase is present, although in this case, additional and significant variation is incorporated through the sexual reproduction.

== Stages ==
=== Diploidization ===
Occasionally, two haploid nuclei fuse to form a diploid nucleus—with two homologous copies of each chromosome. The mechanism is largely unknown, and it seems to be a relatively rare event, but once a diploid nucleus has been formed it can be very stable and divide to form further diploid nuclei, along with the normal haploid nuclei. Thus the heterokaryon consists of a mixture of the two original haploid nuclear types as well as diploid fusion nuclei.

=== Mitotic chiasma formation ===
Chiasma formation is common in meiosis, where two homologous chromosomes break and rejoin, leading to chromosomes that are hybrids of the parental types. It can also occur during mitosis but at a much lower frequency because the chromosomes do not pair in a regular arrangement. Nevertheless, the result will be the same when it does occur—the recombination of genes.

=== Haploidization ===
Occasionally, nondisjunction of chromosomes occurs during division of a diploid nucleus, so that one of the daughter nuclei has one chromosome too many (2n+1) and the other has one chromosome too few (2n–1). Such nuclei with incomplete multiples of the haploid number are termed aneuploid, as they do not have even chromosome number sets such as n or 2n. They tend to be unstable and to lose further chromosomes during subsequent mitotic divisions, until the 2n+1 and 2n-1 nuclei progressively revert to n. Consistent with this, in E. nidulans (where normally, n=8) nuclei have been found with 17 (2n+1), 16 (2n), 15 (2n–1), 12, 11, 10, and 9 chromosomes.

Each of these events is relatively rare, and they do not constitute a regular cycle like the sexual cycle. But the outcome would be similar. Once a diploid nucleus has formed by fusion of two haploid nuclei from different parents, the parental genes can potentially recombine. And, the chromosomes that are lost from an aneuploid nucleus during its reversion to a euploid could be a mixture of those in the parental strain.

== Organisms ==
The potential to undergo a parasexual cycle under laboratory conditions has been demonstrated in many species of filamentous fungi, including Fusarium monoliforme, Penicillium roqueforti (used in making blue cheeses), Verticillium dahliae, Verticillium albo-atrum, Tapesia yallundae, Ustilago scabiosae, Magnaporthe grisea, Passalora fulva, and the human pathogens Candida albicans and Candida tropicalis.

=== Candida species ===
A study of the evolution of sexual reproduction in six Candida species concluded that there were recent losses in components of the major meiotic crossover-formation pathway, but retention of a minor pathway. It was suggested that if Candida species undergo meiosis it is with reduced machinery, or different machinery, and also that unrecognized meiotic cycles may exist in many species.

== Significance ==
Parasexuality has become a useful tool for industrial mycologists to produce strains with desired combinations of properties. Its significance in nature is largely unknown and will depend on the frequency of heterokaryosis, determined by cytoplasmic incompatibility barriers and it is also useful in rDNA technology.
