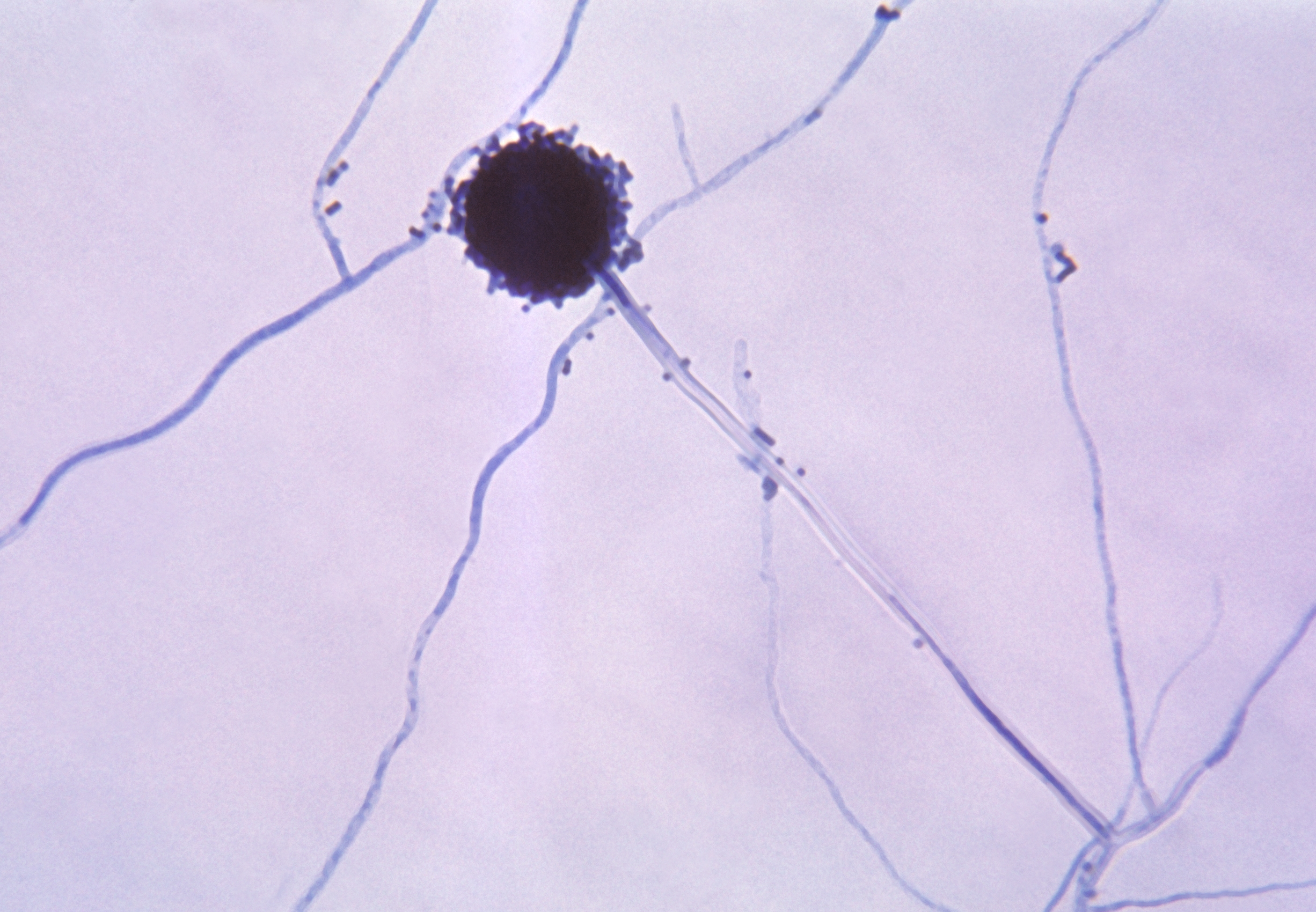
- Conidial head of Aspergillus niger

Scientific classification
- Kingdom: Fungi
- Division: Ascomycota
- Class: Eurotiomycetes
- Order: Eurotiales
- Family: Aspergillaceae
- Genus: Aspergillus; Micheli ex Haller (1768)

Species
- See List of Aspergillus species

Synonyms
- List: Acmosporium Corda (1839); Alliospora Pim (1883); Aspergillopsis Speg. (1910); Aspergillus P.Micheli (1729); Basidiella Cooke (1878); Briarea Corda (1831); Chaetosartorya Subram. (1972); Cladaspergillus Ritgen (1831); Cladosarum E.Yuill & J.L.Yuill (1938); Cleistosoma Harkn. (1884); Clistosoma Clem. & Shear (1931); Cristaspora Fort & Guarro (1984); Dichotomomyces Saito (1949); Dichotomomyces Saito ex D.B.Scott (1970); Diplostephanus Langeron (1922); Edyuillia Subram. (1972); Emericella Berk. (1857); Euaspergillus F.Ludw. (1892); Eurotium Link (1809); Fennellia B.J.Wiley & E.G.Simmons (1973); Gutturomyces Rivolta (1873); Gymnoeurotium Malloch & Cain (1973); Harpezomyces Malloch & Cain (1973); Hemisartorya J.N.Rai & H.J.Chowdhery (1976); Inzengaea Borzí (1885); Neosartorya Malloch & Cain (1973); Otomyces Wreden (1874); Petromyces Malloch & Cain (1973); Phialosimplex Sigler (2010); Polypaecilum G.Sm. (1961); Pyrobolus Kuntze (1891); Raperia Subram. & Rajendran (1976); Redaellia Cif. (1930); Rhodocephalus Corda (1837); Rhopalocystis Grove (1911); Royella R.S.Dwivedi (1960); Saitoa Rajendran & Muthappa (1980); Sartorya Vuill. (1927); Sceptromyces Corda (1831); Sporophormis Malloch & Cain (1973); Sterigmatocystis C.E.Cramer (1859); Stilbothamnium Henn. (1897); Syncleistostroma Subram. (1972); Theclospora Harkn. (1884); Warcupiella Subram. (1972)

= Aspergillus =

Genus of fungi

Aspergillus (/ˌæspərˈdʒɪləs/) is a genus consisting of several hundred mold species found in various climates worldwide.

Aspergillus was first catalogued in 1729 by the Italian priest and biologist Pier Antonio Micheli. Viewing the fungi under a microscope, Micheli was reminded of the shape of an aspergillum (holy water sprinkler), from Latin spargere (to sprinkle), and named the genus accordingly. Aspergillum is an asexual spore-forming structure common to all Aspergillus species; around one-third of species are also known to have a sexual stage. While some species of Aspergillus are known to cause fungal infections, others are of commercial importance.

== Taxonomy ==
=== Species ===
In March 2010, Aspergillus covered 837 species of fungi. Notable species placed in Aspergillus include:

- Aspergillus flavus is a notable plant pathogen impacting crop yields and a common cause of aspergillosis.
- Aspergillus fumigatus is the most common cause of aspergillosis in individuals with an immunodeficiency.
- Aspergillus nidulans has seen heavy use as research organism in cell biology.
- Aspergillus niger is used in the chemical industry for a variety of applications, while also being a known food contaminant and a possible pathogen to humans.
- Aspergillus oryzae and A. sojae are used in East Asian cuisine in the production of sake, soy sauce and other fermented food products.
- Aspergillus terreus is used in the production of organic acids but can also cause opportunistic infections in humans.

=== Inner taxonomy ===
The expansive genus Aspergillosis is currently divided into six subgenera of which many are further split into a total of 27 sections.

- Subgenus Circumdati, divided in 10 sections. Linked to former teleomorphic genera Petromyces, Neopetromyces and Fennellia.
- Subgenus Nidulantes, divided in 9 sections. Linked to former teleomorphic genus Emericella.
- Subgenus Fumigati, divided in 4 sections. Linked to former teleomorphic genus Neocarpenteles, Neosartorya and Dichotomomyces.
- Subgenus Aspergillus, divided in 2 sections. Linked to former teleomorphic genus Eurotium.
- Subgenus and section Cremei. Linked to former teleomorphic genus Chaetosartorya and Cristaspora
- Subgenus and section Polypaecilum. Includes former genera Polypaecilum and Phialosimplex.

The linkage to former teleomorphic genera derive from Samson et al. (2014). The current division is based on Houbracken et al. (2020), which also notes that the former teleomorphic genera are now understood as morphotypes: eurotium-type, neosartorya-type, emericella-type, petromyces-type, chaetosartorya-type, fennellia-type and neopetromyces-type.

== Growth and distribution ==
Aspergillus is defined as a group of conidial fungi—that is, fungi in an asexual state. Some of them, however, are known to have a teleomorph (sexual state) in the Ascomycota. With DNA evidence, all members of the genus Aspergillus are members of the phylum Ascomycota.

Members of the genus possess the ability to grow where a high osmotic pressure exists (high concentration of sugar, salt, etc.). Aspergillus species are highly aerobic and are found in almost all oxygen-rich environments, where they commonly grow as molds on the surface of a substrate, as a result of the high oxygen tension. Commonly, fungi grow on carbon-rich substrates like monosaccharides (such as glucose) and polysaccharides (such as amylose). Aspergillus species are common post-harvest contaminants of starchy foods (such as bread and potatoes), and grow in or on many plants and trees.

In addition to growth on carbon sources, many species of Aspergillus demonstrate oligotrophy where they are capable of growing in nutrient-depleted environments, or environments with a complete lack of key nutrients. Aspergillus niger is a prime example of this; it can be found growing on damp walls, as a major component of mildew.

Several species of Aspergillus, including A. niger and A. fumigatus, will readily colonise buildings, favouring warm and damp or humid areas such as bathrooms and around window frames.

Aspergillus are found in millions of pillows.

== Commercial importance ==
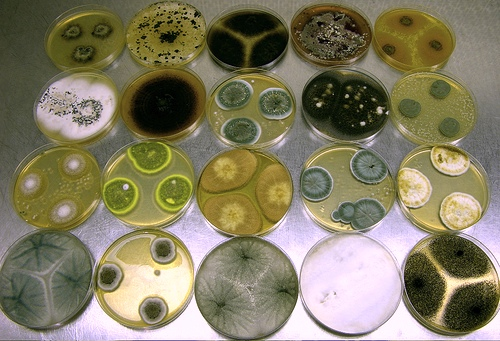
Various Penicillium, Aspergillus spp. and other fungi growing in axenic culture

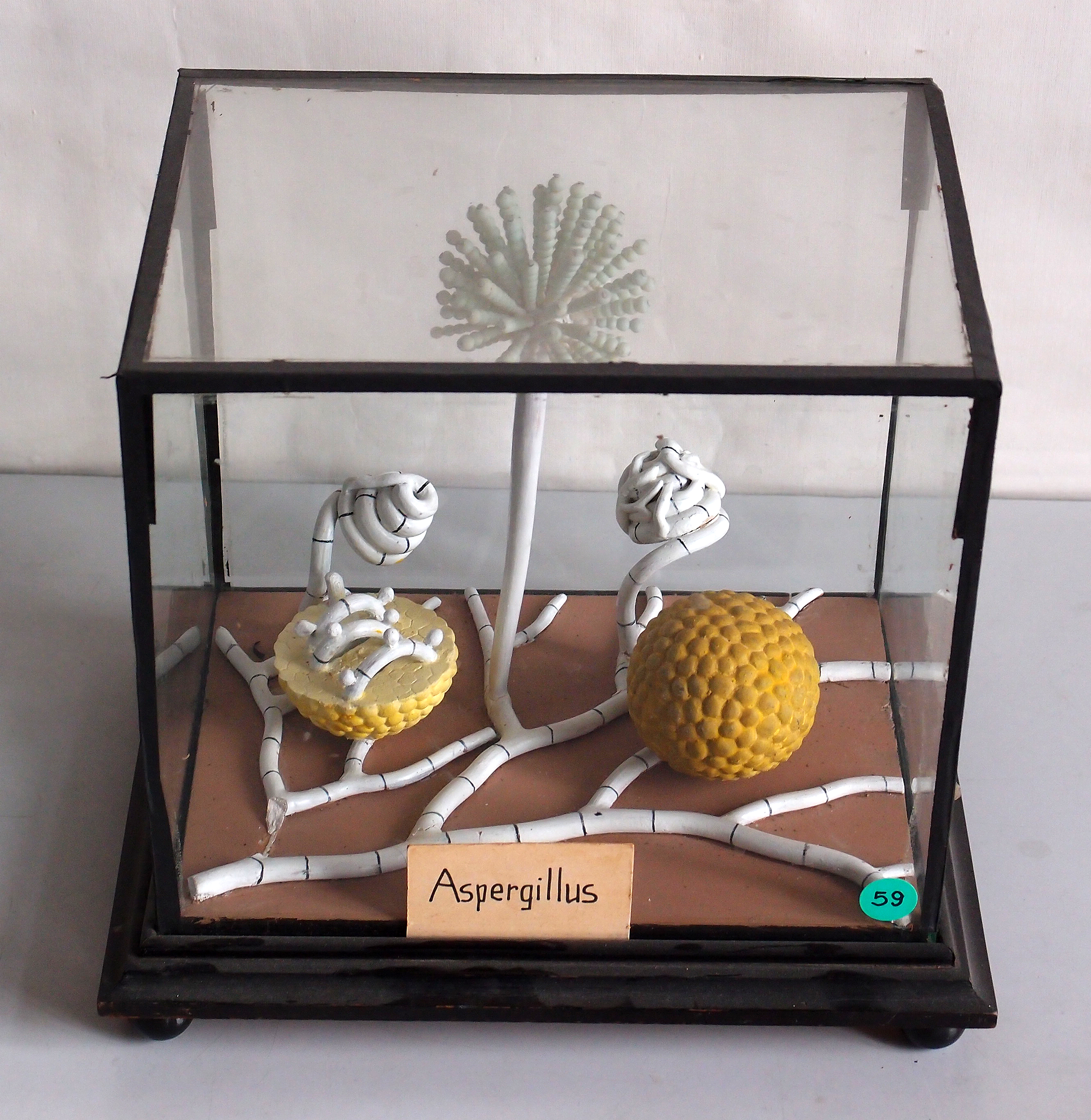
Historical model of Aspergillus, Botanical Museum Greifswald

Species of Aspergillus are important medically and commercially. Some species can cause infection in humans and other animals. Some infections found in animals have been studied for years, while other species found in animals have been described as new and specific to the investigated disease, and others have been known as names already in use for organisms such as saprophytes. More than 60 Aspergillus species are medically relevant pathogens. For humans, a range of diseases such as infection to the external ear, pulmonary disease, skin lesions, and ulcers classed as mycetomas are found.

Other species are important in commercial microbial fermentations. For example, alcoholic beverages such as Japanese sake are often made from rice or other starchy ingredients (like manioc), rather than from grapes or malted barley. Typical microorganisms used to make alcohol, such as yeasts of the genus Saccharomyces, cannot ferment these starches. Therefore, koji mold such as Aspergillus oryzae is used to first break down the starches into simpler sugars.

Members of the genus are also sources of natural products that can be used in the development of medications to treat human disease. Aspergillus spp. are known to produce anthraquinone which has commercial importance due to its antibacterial and antifungal properties.

Perhaps the largest application of Aspergillus niger is as the major source of citric acid; this organism accounts for over 90% of global citric acid production, equaling more than 2.54 million metric tonnes (2.8 million US tons) per year. A. niger is also commonly used for the production of native and foreign enzymes, including glucose oxidase, lysozyme, and lactase. In these instances, the culture is rarely grown on a solid substrate, although this is still common practice in Japan, but is more often grown as a submerged culture in a bioreactor. In this way, the most important parameters can be strictly controlled, and maximal productivity can be achieved. This process also makes it far easier to separate the chemical or enzyme of importance from the medium, and is therefore far more cost-effective.

== Research ==
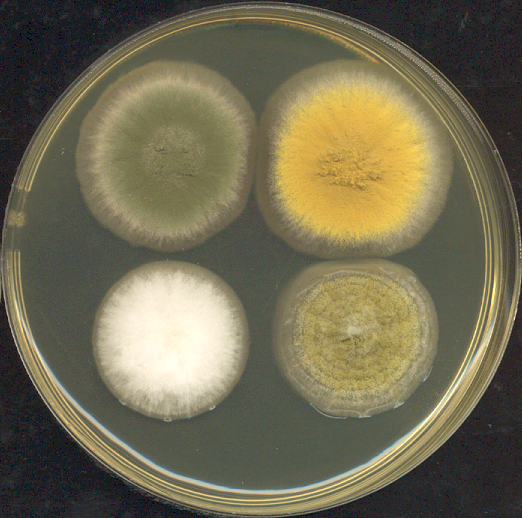
Four three-day-old Aspergillus colonies. Clockwise from top-left: an A. nidulans laboratory strain; a similar strain with a mutation in the yA marker gene involved in green pigmentation; an A. oryzae strain used in soy fermentation; A. oryzae RIB40

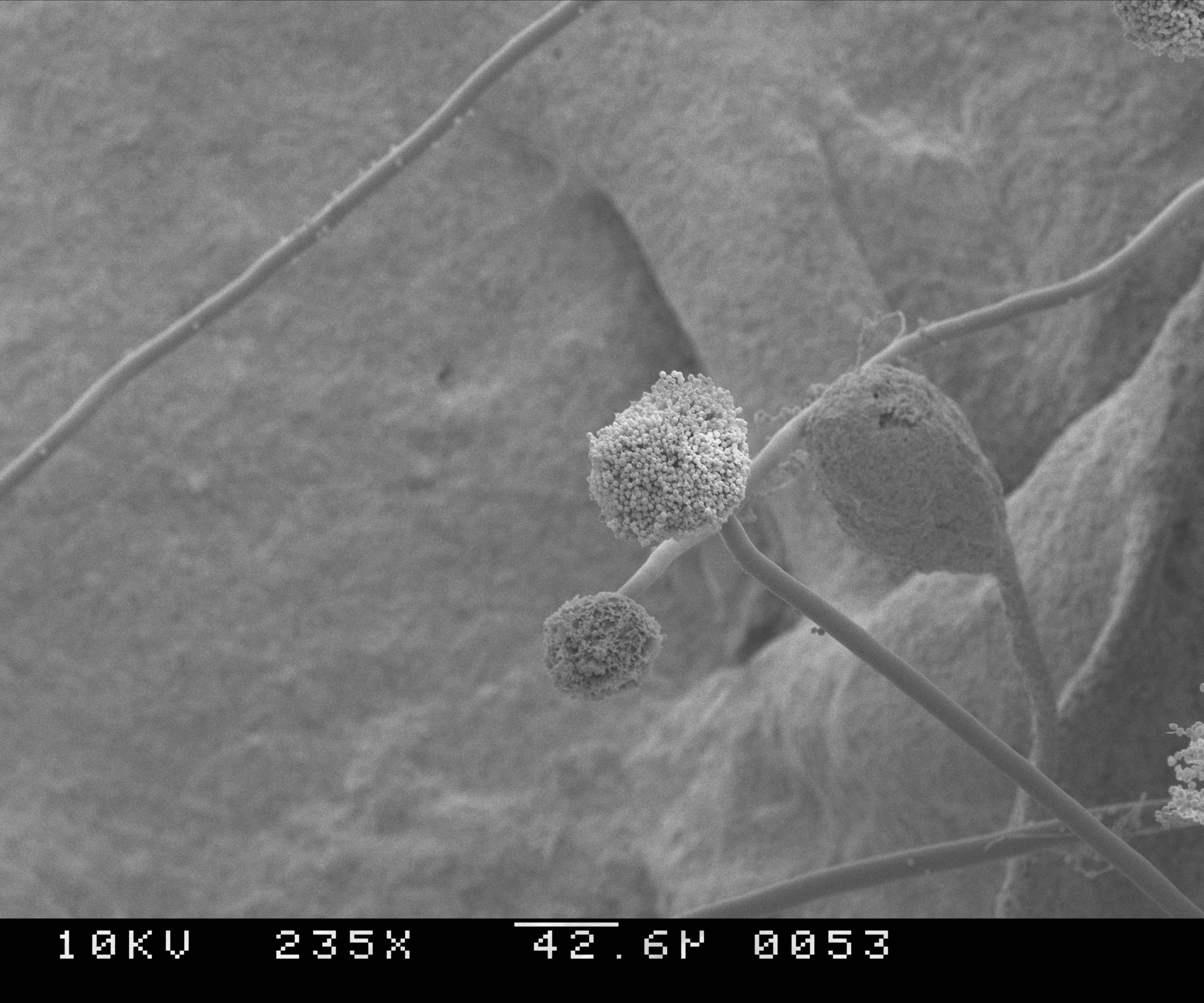
A scan of Aspergillus taken at 235 magnifications under a scanning electron microscope

A. nidulans (Emericella nidulans) has been used as a research organism for many years and was used by Guido Pontecorvo to demonstrate parasexuality in fungi. Recently, A. nidulans was one of the pioneering organisms to have its genome sequenced by researchers at the Broad Institute. As of 2008, a further seven Aspergillus species have had their genomes sequenced: the industrially useful A. niger (two strains), A. oryzae, and A. terreus, and the pathogens A. clavatus, A. fischerianus (Neosartorya fischeri), A. flavus, and A. fumigatus (two strains). A. fischerianus is hardly ever pathogenic, but is very closely related to the common pathogen A. fumigatus; it was sequenced in part to better understand A. fumigatus pathogenicity.

=== Sexual reproduction ===
Of the 250 species of aspergilli, about 64% have no known sexual state. However, many of these species likely have an as yet unidentified sexual stage. Sexual reproduction occurs in two fundamentally different ways in fungi. These are outcrossing (in heterothallic fungi) in which two different individuals contribute nuclei, and self-fertilization or selfing (in homothallic fungi) in which both nuclei are derived from the same individual. In recent years, sexual cycles have been discovered in numerous species previously thought to be asexual. These discoveries reflect recent experimental focus on species of particular relevance to humans.

A. fumigatus is the most common species to cause disease in immunodeficient humans. In 2009, A. fumigatus was shown to have a heterothallic, fully functional sexual cycle. Isolates of complementary mating types are required for sex to occur.

A. flavus is the major producer of carcinogenic aflatoxins in crops worldwide. It is also an opportunistic human and animal pathogen, causing aspergillosis in immunocompromised individuals. In 2009, a sexual state of this heterothallic fungus was found to arise when strains of opposite mating types were cultured together under appropriate conditions.

A. lentulus is an opportunistic human pathogen that causes invasive aspergillosis with high mortality rates. In 2013, A. lentulus was found to have a heterothallic functional sexual breeding system.

A. terreus is commonly used in industry to produce important organic acids and enzymes, and was the initial source for the cholesterol-lowering drug lovastatin. In 2013, A. terreus was found to be capable of sexual reproduction when strains of opposite mating types were crossed under appropriate culture conditions.

These findings with Aspergillus species are consistent with accumulating evidence, from studies of other eukaryotic species, that sex was likely present in the common ancestor of all eukaryotes.

A. nidulans, a homothallic fungus, is capable of self-fertilization. Selfing involves activation of the same mating pathways characteristic of sex in outcrossing species, i.e. self-fertilization does not bypass required pathways for outcrossing sex, but instead requires activation of these pathways within a single individual.

Among those Aspergillus species that exhibit a sexual cycle, the overwhelming majority in nature are homothallic (self-fertilizing). This observation suggests Aspergillus species can generally maintain sex though little genetic variability is produced by homothallic self-fertilization. A. fumigatus, a heterothallic (outcrossing) fungus that occurs in areas with widely different climates and environments, also displays little genetic variability either within geographic regions or on a global scale, again suggesting sex, in this case outcrossing sex, can be maintained even when little genetic variability is produced.

=== Genomics ===
The simultaneous publication of three Aspergillus genome manuscripts in Nature in December 2005 established the genus as the leading filamentous fungal genus for comparative genomic studies. Like most major genome projects, these efforts were collaborations between a large sequencing centre and the respective community of scientists. For example, the Institute for Genome Research (TIGR) worked with the A. fumigatus community. A. nidulans was sequenced at the Broad Institute. A. oryzae was sequenced in Japan at the National Institute of Advanced Industrial Science and Technology. The Joint Genome Institute of the Department of Energy has released sequence data for a citric acid-producing strain of A. niger. TIGR, now renamed the J. Craig Venter Institute, is currently spearheading a project on the A. flavus genome.

Aspergillus is characterized by high levels of genetic diversity and, using protostome divergence as a scale, is as diverse as the Vertebrates phylum although both inter and intra-specific genome structure is relatively plastic. The genomes of some Aspergillus species, such as A. flavus and A. oryzae, are more rich and around 20% larger than others, such as A. nidulans and A. fumigatus. Several mechanisms could explain this difference, although the combination of segmental duplication, genome duplication, and horizontal gene transfer acting in a piecemeal fashion is well-supported.

Genome sizes for sequenced species of Aspergillus range from about 29.3 Mb for A. fumigatus to 37.1 Mb for A. oryzae, while the numbers of predicted genes vary from about 9926 for A. fumigatus to about 12,071 for A. oryzae. The genome size of an enzyme-producing strain of A. niger is of intermediate size at 33.9 Mb.

== Pathogens ==
Some Aspergillus species cause serious disease in humans and animals. The most common pathogenic species are A. fumigatus and A. flavus, which produces aflatoxin which is both a toxin and a carcinogen, and which can contaminate foods such as nuts. The most common species causing allergic disease are A. fumigatus and A. clavatus. Other species are important as agricultural pathogens. Aspergillus spp. cause disease on many grain crops, especially maize, and some variants synthesize mycotoxins, including aflatoxin. Aspergillus can cause neonatal infections.

A. fumigatus (the most common species) infections are primary pulmonary infections and can potentially become a rapidly necrotizing pneumonia with a potential to disseminate. The organism can be differentiated from other common mold infections based on the fact that it takes on a mold form both in the environment and in the host (unlike Candida albicans which is a dimorphic mold in the environment and a yeast in the body).

== Aspergillosis ==
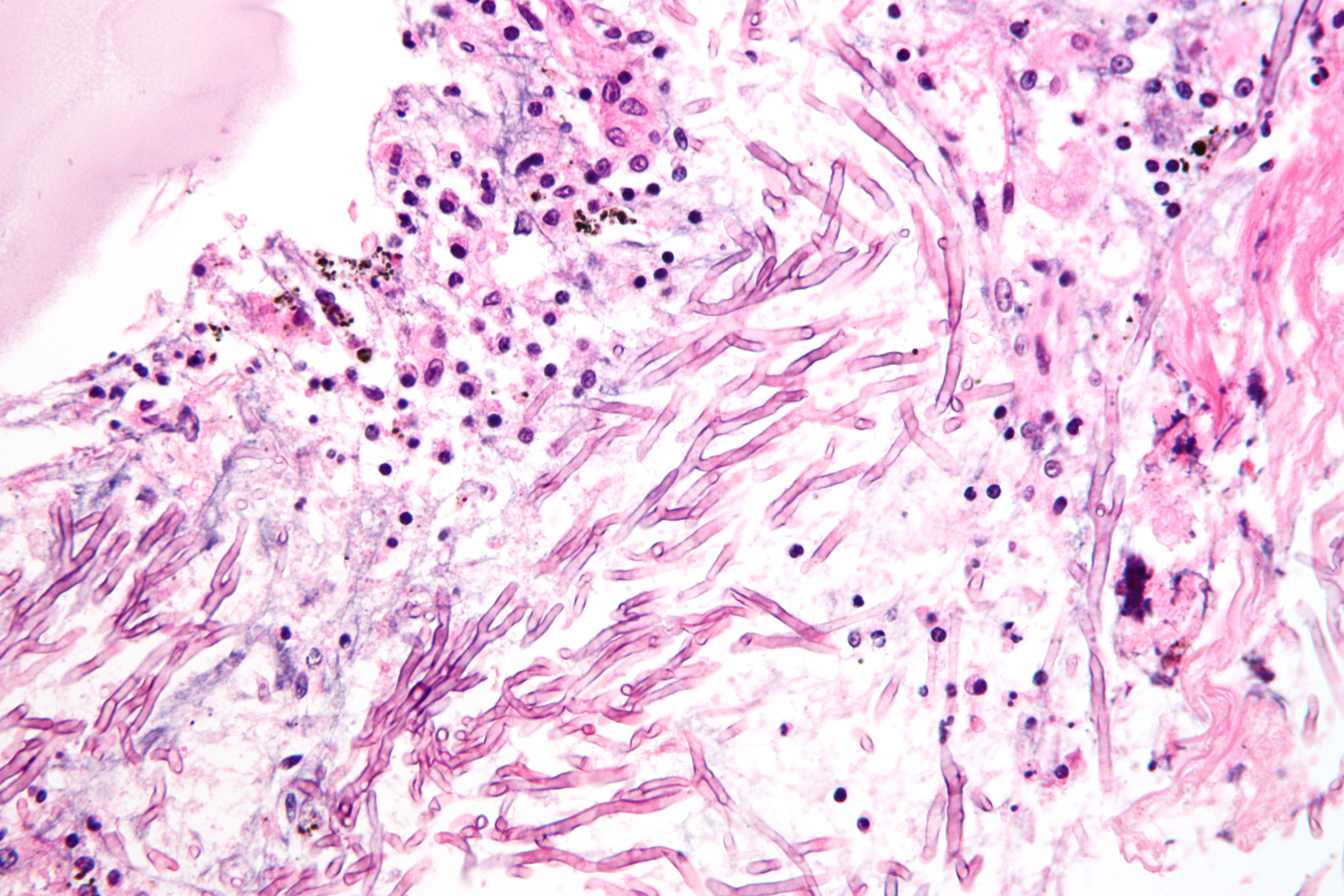
Pulmonary aspergillosis

Aspergillosis is the group of diseases caused by Aspergillus. The most common species among paranasal sinus infections associated with aspergillosis is A. fumigatus. The symptoms include fever, cough, chest pain, or breathlessness, which also occur in many other illnesses, so diagnosis can be difficult. Usually, only patients with already weakened immune systems or who suffer other lung conditions are susceptible.

In humans, the major forms of disease are:

- Acute invasive aspergillosis, a form that grows into surrounding tissue, more common in those with weakened immune systems such as AIDS or chemotherapy patients
- Allergic bronchopulmonary aspergillosis, which affects patients with respiratory diseases such as asthma, cystic fibrosis, and sinusitis
- Aspergilloma, a "fungus ball" that can form within cavities such as the lung
- Disseminated invasive aspergillosis, an infection spread widely through the body

Fungal infections from Aspergillus spores remain one theory of sickness and untimely death of some early Egyptologists and tomb explorers. Ancient spores which grew on the remains of food offerings and mummies sealed in tombs and chambers may have been blown around and inhaled by the excavators, ultimately linked to the notion of the curse of the pharaohs.

Aspergillosis of the air passages is also frequently reported in birds, and certain species of Aspergillus have been known to infect insects.

Most people inhale Aspergillus into their lungs everyday, but generally only the immuno-compromised become sick with aspergillosis.

== See also ==
- Mold health issues
- Sick building syndrome
- Cryptococcus
