= Delphinella abietis =

Scientific classification
- Domain: Eukaryota
- Kingdom: Fungi
- Division: Ascomycota
- Class: Dothideomycetes
- Order: Dothideales
- Family: Dothioraceae
- Genus: Delphinella
- Species: D. abietis

Binomial name
- Delphinella abietis (O.Rostr.) E.Müll.

Synonyms
- Mycosphaerella abietis (O.Rostr.) Lindau; Mycosphaerella bohemica (Bubák & Kabát) Sacc.; Mycosphaerella bohemica (Bubák & Kabát) Sacc. ex Trotter; Rehmiellopsis abietis (O.Rostr.) O.Rostr.; Rehmiellopsis bohemica Bubák & Kabát; Sphaerella abietis O.Rostr.

Species of fungi

Delphinella abietis is a species of fungus in the family Dothioraceae. It has been reported from western Norway where it infects needles and sometimes shoots of various fir species. These include subalpine fir, Nordmann fir including Turkish fir, Siberian fir and noble fir.
