= Aureobasidium melanogenum =

Scientific classification
- Kingdom: Fungi
- Division: Ascomycota
- Class: Dothideomycetes
- Order: Dothideales
- Family: Dothioraceae
- Genus: Aureobasidium
- Species: A. melanogenum

Binomial name
- Aureobasidium melanogenum Zalar, Gostincar, Gunde-Cimerman (2014)

Species of fungus

Aureobasidium melanogenum, formerly known as Aureobasidium pullulans var. melanogenum is a ubiquitous black, yeast-like fungus that is found mainly in freshwater habitats. The species also includes strains causing human infections, which were previously classified as A. pullulans. It was named due to abundant melanin production and accumulation in the cell walls, which leads to dark green, brown or black appearance of the cells and colonies The species was established when the genomes of the four former varieties of Aureobasidium pullulans were sequenced and the large differences between them were discovered.

The species tolerates up to 10% of NaCl and grows between 10 °C and 35 °C. Colonies on malt extract agar on average grow to 25 mm in 7 days (at 25 °C), appearing smooth and slimy due to abundant sporulation and EPS formation. In two weeks the colonies become green to black due to the production of melanin. Melanin is produced during the production of pullulan, a polysaccharide partly responsible of the biofilm formation. Aerial mycelium is generally absent (with exceptions). Frequently both mycelium and yeast-like cells are present.

The genome of A. melanogenum (as well as other closely related species) contains unusually high numbers of genes for extracellular enzymes for carbohydrate degradation (CAZy) and proteases, MFS membrane sugar transporters, and alkali metal cation transporters (or ion transporters). Genes presumably involved in the synthesis of the biotechnologically important polysaccharide pullulan and siderophores were found, but the gene for antibiotic Aureobasidin A could not be identified. Genes possibly associated with the degradation of plastic and aromatic compounds are also present.

Due to the relatively recent redefinition of the species, most published work does not yet distinguish between the new species belonging to the previously recognised A. pullulans species complex. It is therefore not clear to what extent this knowledge is valid for A. melanogenum.

== See also ==
- Aureobasidium namibiae
- Aureobasidium pullulans
- Aureobasidium subglaciale
- Yeast in winemaking
