= Aureobasidium namibiae =

Scientific classification
- Kingdom: Fungi
- Division: Ascomycota
- Class: Dothideomycetes
- Order: Dothideales
- Family: Dothioraceae
- Genus: Aureobasidium
- Species: A. namibiae

Binomial name
- Aureobasidium namibiae Zalar, Gostincar, Gunde-Cimerman (2014)

Species of fungus

Aureobasidium namibiae, formerly known as Aureobasidium pullulans var. namibiae is a ubiquitous black, yeast-like fungus. It was described on the basis of only one strain isolated from dolomitic marble in Namibia (hence its name namibiae). The species was established when the genomes of the four former varieties of Aureobasidium pullulans were sequenced and the large differences between them were discovered.

The species tolerates up to 10% of NaCl and grows between 10 °C and 30 °C. Colonies on malt extract agar on average grow to 25 mm in 7 days (at 25 °C), appearing smooth and shiny due to the leathery structure. The reverse is apricot. Aerial mycelium is absent. Frequently both mycelium and yeast-like cells are present.

The genome of A. namibiae (as well as other closely related species) contains unusually high numbers of genes for extracellular enzymes for carbohydrate degradation (CAZy) and proteases, MFS membrane sugar transporters, and alkali metal cation transporters (or ion transporters). Genes presumably involved in the synthesis of the biotechnologically important polysaccharide pullulan and siderophores were found, but the gene for antibiotic Aureobasidin A could not be identified. Genes possibly associated with the degradation of plastic and aromatic compounds are also present.

Due to the relatively recent redefinition of the species, most published work does not yet distinguish between the new species belonging to the previously recognised A. pullulans species complex. It is therefore not clear to what extent this knowledge is valid for A. namibiae.

== See also ==
- Aureobasidium melanogenum
- Aureobasidium pullulans
- Aureobasidium subglaciale
- Yeast in winemaking
