= Neopullulanase =

Class of enzymes

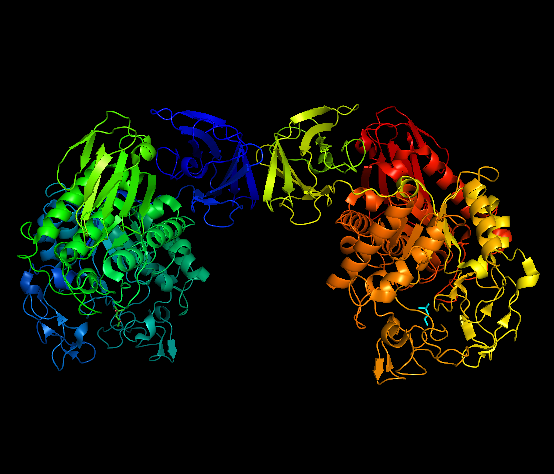
- View of Thermoactinomyces vulgaris neopulullanase showing dimeric structure.

Identifiers
- EC no.: 3.2.1.135
- CAS no.: 119632-58-5

Databases
- IntEnz: IntEnz view
- BRENDA: BRENDA entry
- ExPASy: NiceZyme view
- KEGG: KEGG entry
- MetaCyc: metabolic pathway
- PRIAM: profile
- PDB structures: RCSB PDB PDBe PDBsum
Search
- PMC: articles
- PubMed: articles
- NCBI: proteins

Neopullulanase (EC 3.2.1.135, pullulanase II) is an enzyme of the alpha-amylase family with systematic name pullulan 4-D-glucanohydrolase (panose-forming). This enzyme principally catalyses the following chemical reaction by cleaving pullulan's alpha-1,4-glucosidic bonds:

Hydrolysis of pullulan to panose (6-alpha-D-glucosylmaltose)

The breakdown of the alpha-1,4- and alpha-1,6-glucosidic bonds of intermediates produced in addition to panose generates further quantities of panose along with some maltose and glucose.

== Structure ==
Neopullulanase is a dimer of identical monomer subunits, each with four domains (N,A,B,C) that are highly conserved with other starch hydrolases, namely alpha-amylase, pullulanase, cyclomaltodextrin glucanotransferase, and 1,4-alpha-D-glucan branching enzyme (also known as glycogen branching enzyme). Like these enzymes, each monomer contains an active site at the carboxyl-terminus within a TIM barrel (also known as an alpha/beta barrel), an alpha/beta protein fold structure consisting of eight parallel beta-strands connected by eight external alpha-helices.

This conserved structural domain is estimated to occur in roughly 10% of all proteins and may evolutionarily link neopullulanase and the similar starch hydrolases to a much larger family of enzymes, though the domain's common ancestry is debated due to a lack of conclusive sequence homology. In neopullulanase the barrel is located within domain A with its active site straddling domain A of one monomer with domain N of the other monomer. This results in narrower active site than the other alpha-amylase enzymes, which do not dimerize, and likely contributes to its ability of hydrolyzing both alpha-1,4- and alpha-1,6-glucosidic linkages.

== Mechanism ==
The hydrolysis of pullulan to panose is catalyzed by three amino acid residues within neopullulanase's active site that cleave a glycosidic bond: one glutamate and two aspartates. A glycosidic oxygen is first protonated by the carboxyl group of a glutamate residue (TAA Glu-230) through generic acid catalysis. The C1 carbon of pullulan is then attacked by a nucleophilic aspartate residue (TAA Asp-206). The carboxylate group of a second aspartate residue (TAA Asp-297) deprotonates an adjacent water molecule to form a hydroxide ion which hydroxylates at the C1 carbon. Alternatively it is possible that this reaction is concerted with the departed glycosidic oxygen being protonated to cause the hydroxylation.

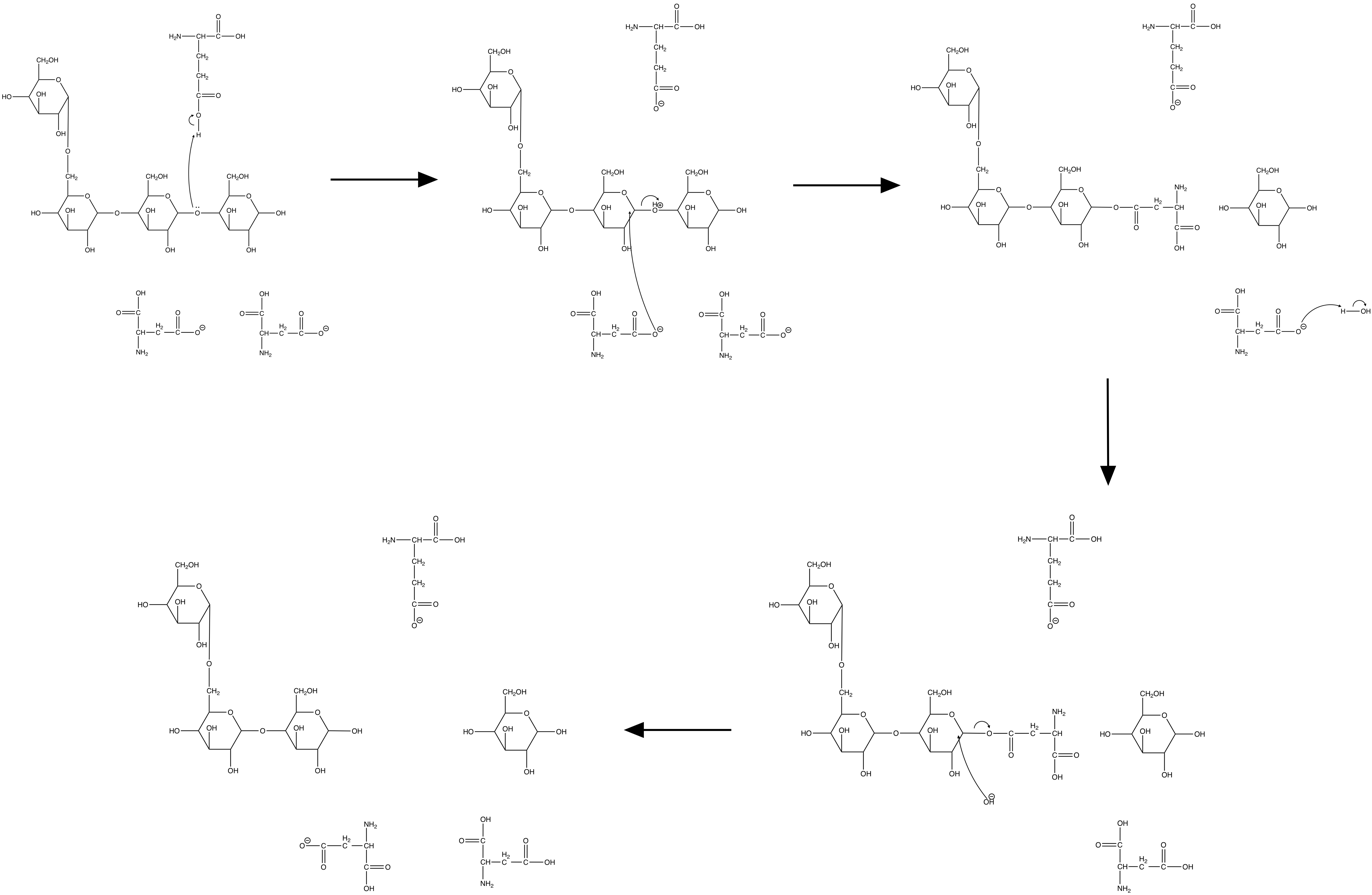
Mechanism of neopullulanase catalyzing hydrolysis of pullulan decomposition intermediate into panose and maltose.

The three residues responsible for neopullulanase catalysis are invariably present in enzymes of the alpha-amylase family. Mutation of these residues in neopullulanase results in a complete loss of enzymatic activity.

While most alpha-amylase enzymes only cleave alpha-1,4-linkages in their substrates, neopullulanase additionally cleaves alpha-1,6-linkages. In addition to the narrowness of the actives site resulting from the enzyme's dimeric structure, this additional functionality is thought to be facilitated by two histidine residues (TAA His-122 and TAA His-296) that interact with the glycan bond to be cleaved. As these histidines are present in the other alpha-amylase enzymes it is thought the functional difference arises from a difference in transition state stabilization energy contributions from the side chains of adjacent residues which vary from enzyme to enzyme.

This allows for neopullulanase's multistep breakdown of pullulan. The enzyme first selectively hydrolyzes alpha-1,4-glucosidic bonds on the nonreducing side of pullulan's alpha-1,6-glucosidic bonds, producing panose and panose-containing intermediates. These intermediates then have their alpha-1,4- and alpha-1,6-glucosidic bonds hydrolyzed to form additional panose along with smaller quantities of maltose and glucose.

== Biological function ==
Pullulan, which is produced from starch, is a polysaccharide polymer consisting of repeating maltotriose units. It provides a protective effect against cellular desiccation in low-moisture environments.

The presence of neopullulanase allows cells to recycle unneeded or excess pullulan by breaking it down into panose, maltose, and glucose which can then be formed back into starch or consumed for energy production.

== Industrial relevance ==
While not currently employed in any industrial processes, a method of producing isomaltooligosaccharide syrup using Bacillus stearothermophilus neopullulase has been proposed, taking advantage of neopullulase's ability to catalyze hydrolysis of branched oligosaccharides' alpha-1-6-glucosidic linkages. While primarily used as a source for dietary fiber, isomaltooligosaccharide syrup is also used as a low-calorie sweetener that can reduce the buildup of dental plaque when present in place of sucrose.

This process is simpler than the currently prevalent industrial process which relies upon multiple steps featuring four enzymes (alpha-amylase, pullulanase, beta-amylase, and alpha-D-glucosidase) and only achieves a 40% yield of isomaltooligosaccharides from starch. When immobilized neopullulanase is immersed in a buffered starch solution and incubated, a solution of isomaltooligosaccharides results at slightly over 40% yield. To further raise the yield to approximately 60%, which is thought to be so low since neopullulanase hydrolyzes starch less efficiently than pullunan and other oligosaccharides, saccharifying alpha-amylase sourced from Bacillus subtilis may be added to the solution.

== See also ==
- EC 3.2.1.41, pullulanase
- EC 3.2.1.57, isopullulanase
