= Delphinella balsameae =

Scientific classification
- Domain: Eukaryota
- Kingdom: Fungi
- Division: Ascomycota
- Class: Dothideomycetes
- Order: Dothideales
- Family: Dothioraceae
- Genus: Delphinella
- Species: D. balsameae

Binomial name
- Delphinella balsameae (Waterman) E.Müll.

Synonyms
- Rehmiellopsis balsameae Waterman

Species of fungi

Delphinella balsameae is a species of fungus in the family Dothioraceae. It is a known plant pathogen, reported to cause blight in Siberian fir in Russia, balsam fir, white fir and subalpine fir in North-America.
