= Pullulan bioconjugate =

Pullulan bioconjugates are systems that use pullulan as a scaffold to attach biological materials to, such as drugs. These systems can be used to enhance the delivery of drugs to specific environments or the mechanism of delivery. These systems can be used in order to deliver drugs in response to stimuli, create a more controlled and sustained release, and provide a more targeted delivery of certain drugs.

== Pullulan formulation ==
Pullulan is generated by the microbial A. pullulans through the processing mainly of glucose, but can also be produced from maltose, fructose, galactose, sucrose, and mannose. In a commercial setting, pullulan is obtained from a strain of A. pullulans that is non-toxic, non-pathogenic, and unmodified genetically that is given a liquid form of starch in a set environment. The pullulan produced can be modified by different conditions such as the nutrients provided, temperature, pH, oxygen content, and other supplements. The microbial needs to be provided with a source of carbon and nitrogen in order to produce pullulan and the ratio of carbon to nitrogen needs to be precise in order to maximize pullulan production. Higher levels of nitrogen than carbon are required as excess carbon can decrease the efficiency of the enzymes and excess nitrogen can increase the production of biomass, but does not affect the pullulan production. Oxygen is also important for the proliferation of the A. pullulans cells and the production of pullulan. Further supplements can be used in order to increase the level of pullulan production, such as olive oil and tween 80.

While the manufacturing conditions of pullulan can be altered in order to increase yield, chemical modifications of pullulan can also be used to alter the properties of the pullulan. The unmodified structure of pullulan contains nine hydroxyl groups attached to the backbone of the molecule, and these hydroxyl groups can be replaced with other functional groups. Some examples of processes that can modify the functional groups of pullulan include sulfation, esterification, oxidation, etherification, copolymerization, amidification, and others. Pullulan can be given a negative charge through creating an ester linkage that attaches a carboxylate group to the hydroxyl, which yields a carboxymethyl pullulan. Pullulan is hydrophilic and can be modified to have hydrophobic functionality by adding a cholesterol group. The main benefit of the added hydrophobic functionality is that it makes it so the pullulan can form self assembling micelles. Another notable modification to pullulan is the acetylation of pullulan in order to create pullulan acetate (PA), which also has a hydrophobic functionality. PA has the benefit of forming self-assembled nanoparticles, which can simplify manufacturing of certain pullulan bioconjugates. Pullulan and pullulan derivatives can also be folated in order to improve cancer cell targeting as the nanoparticle can be endocytosed into the cancer cells through folate-mediated endocytosis.

== Stimuli responsive systems ==
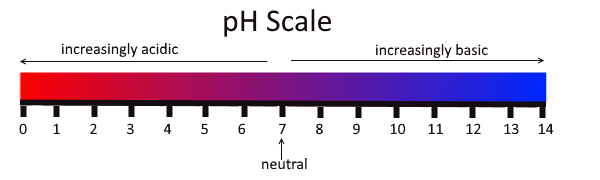
A pH scale that indicates that a pH of 1 to 6 are acidic, a pH of 7 is neutral and a pH of 8 to 14 is neutral.

Pullulan bioconjugate systems can be formed to respond to many different stimuli to enhance the release of the drug to the target tissue. These stimuli include pH, temperature, photothermal, electrical, ultrasonic, magnetic, and enzymatic. The pH is often used to target tumor tissues, as the extracellular pH of tumors is more acidic than the normal cells.

A pullulan and polydopamine hydrogel loaded with crystal violet demonstrated pH responsive behavior due to the protonation of the polydopamine, which increased the release of the crystal violet in the acidic environment. The study showed that at a pH of a normal cell's extracellular environment, 7.4, about 60% of the crystal violet was released compared to the 87% release when in a pH of 5.0. The use of pH responsive systems for the treatment of cancer may aid in the ability to overcome resistance of the drug as well as prevent excess damage to healthy tissue.

Another pH responsive pullulan system was formed with pullulan and doxorubicin where the doxorubicin is attached to the pullulan by hydrazone bonds. The drug release of the doxorubicin was tested at two pHs, 7.4 and 5, where the hydrazine is stable at 7.4 and cleaves in acidic environments. The results from this study supported the results from the pullulan and polydopamine study, as doxorubicin was released faster in the acidic environment than the pH that reflected a normal cell's extracellular environment.

Temperature can also be used as a trigger to control the drug release from pullulan systems. Thermal responsive pullulan systems can be used in conjunction with thermal generating treatments for cancer in order to improve the treatment. Nanoparticles composed of periodate oxidized carboxymethyl pullulan crosslinked with two Jeffamines were synthesized and demonstrated that the nanoparticle size could be decreased with increased temperature. The nanoparticles decrease in size with increasing temperature due to the increased temperature promoting the hydrophobic interactions of the structure. Altering the temperature can induce heating or cooling dynamics that are reversible, which allows for unique properties in terms of drug release. Pullulan can be altered with photosensitizers in order to provide a controlled thermal reaction in a target area. Spiropyrane can be added to pullulan in order to act as a photosensitizer.

Electrical stimuli can be used to alter the delivery of drugs through pullulan constructs. A copolymer polyacrylamide-graft-pullulan was synthesized and used for transdermal delivery of rivastigmine tartarate. In this study, the use of electric stimuli demonstrated the ability to increase the diffusion rate and in a way acted as a controllable switch to control diffusion rate. Pullulan systems can be used to enhance ultrasound imaging, as pullulan-graft-poly(carboxybetaine methacrylate) demonstrated the ability to generate carbon dioxide in response to ultrasound, which enhanced the contrast. Superparamagnetic iron oxide nanoparticles (SPIONs) have been generated which have magnetic properties, which showed to improve uptake and also decrease the cytotoxicity. Enzymes can also be used to trigger drug release mechanisms, such as how esterase has been used to cleave photosensitizers from pullulan in order to increase the photodynamic reaction.

As demonstrated in the last example, these stimuli response mechanisms do not have to be independent. They can be used in combinations in order to improve the efficacy of the drug delivery.

== Self-assembled pullulan mechanism ==
A demonstration of a micelle structure with a hydrophobic core and hydrophilic surface.

When pullulan is modified with a hydrophobic functionality, such as cholesterol, the pullulan derivative forms self-assembled vesicles that can encapsulate a hydrophobic drug. With the hydrophobic functional group, the pullulan derivative is an amphiphilic molecule, which when in an aqueous environment forms a micelle. This micelle has a hydrophilic exterior with the pullulan backbone and a hydrophobic core due to the functional group added to the pullulan. The nanoparticles formed are spherical, have an average size of 20-30 nanometers according to dynamic light scattering measurements, and are able to be maintained in physiological conditions. Cholesteryl-pullulan (CHP) is an example of a pullulan derivative that is capable of forming self-assembled mechanisms and has been used to anticancer drugs. The size of the self-assembled nanoparticle can be adjusted by changing the amount of cholesterol attached to the pullulan. The higher the number of cholesterol substitutions, the smaller the nanoparticle created. PA and folated PA (FPA) have been created and form self-assembled nanoparticles, which have been used to deliver epirubicin. Pullulan derivatives have been combined with gold to form self-assembled nanoparticles that were capable of loading doxorubicin. Pullulan-dexamethasone bioconjugates have been created which also exhibit self-assembling nanoparticles that have an approximate size of 400 nanometers and have shown to extend the release of the dexamethasone.

== Anticancer ==
Pullulan is used as a bioconjugate platform in order to enhance the delivery of chemotherapeutics. Pullulan derivatives can be created in order to specifically target cancer cells. In terms of cancer therapeutics, pullulan can be used to encapsulate hydrophobic cancer therapeutics through self assembled micelles, can be linked to drugs in the form of a bioconjugate, and can be utilized for its pH responsive nature. Cancer drugs that have been used with pullulan include doxorubicin, paclitaxel, epirubicin, mitoxantrone, and 10-hydroxycamptothecin.

Pullulan derivatives can be folated in order to take advantage of the higher density of folate receptors on cancer cells. Doxorubicin has been loaded into pullulan micelles and folated micelles for targeted delivery to cancer cells through folate mediated endocytosis. The use of folated pullulan nanoparticles shows lower toxicity and higher levels of drug accumulation within the cancer cells. The pH sensitivity of pullulan also makes pullulan a good candidate for chemotherapeutic delivery, as the pullulan can be altered by the acidic environment of the tumor to provide targeted release.

Pullulan nanoparticles have also been used to deliver paclitaxel and proved to be stable under different environmental conditions. Curcumin pullulan derivatives have a great effect in targeting hepatocarcinoma cells, as the pullulan increases the ability of curcumin to solubilize, and therefore allows for the cells to properly uptake the curcumin. Pullulan micelles can also be used to deliver genes, such as p53, in order to suppress tumor development. The pullulan protects the RNA or DNA from degradation from enzymes within the body, which enables the ability of gene therapy for treatment of cancer. The addition of ascorbic acid to pullulan bioconjugates has demonstrated antimetastic properties, which can improve cation modified pullulan derivatives. There are many factors that make pullulan a suitable drug delivery platform for cancer therapeutics. Some of these factors include the chemical modifications, the pH responsiveness, as well as the ability for the pullulan to form self-assembled micelles that can protect the therapeutics from the immune system.

In vitro research has been conducted that synthesized pullulan acetate nanoparticles altered with folate and then loaded with epirubicin. This study showed that the use of folate modification to pullulan increased the cytotoxicity of the drug as well as released the drug at a faster rate than unfolated pullulan acetate. Another pullulan folated system was researched, where pullulan gold nanoparticles were folated and encapsulated doxorubicin. The pullulan gold nanoparticle provided pH controlled release of the doxorubicin and demonstrated lower toxicity to non cancer cells than doxorubicin without a carrier platform. CHP systems have been developed to deliver protein vaccines and have shown success in generating different degrees of immune responses mostly with CD4 T cells. Biotinylated pullulan acetate (BPA) have been created as they have vitamin H functionality, which helps increase the level of interaction with cancer cells. The drawback with vitamin H is that increasing the vitamin H increases the interaction of the nanoparticles with cancer cells, but also lowers the concentration of the drug in the nanoparticle due to the altered hydrophobicity. Modifications to pullulan can be made to enhance the controlled release of drugs, such as pullulan-g-poly(L-lactide) due to the water insoluble nature of the polymeric component. Doxorubicin has been conjugated to pullulan through hydrazone bonds, but was shown to have lower cytotoxic activity than doxorubicin without a delivery platform.

== Intravitreal applications ==
The ocular space is a difficult area to deliver drugs into and therefore special drug delivery considerations need to be taken into account. Intravitreal injections are a common method of delivery drugs to the eye. Pullulan systems can be utilized in intravitreal injections in order to develop drugs that are long lasting and therefore require less frequent injections. One study looked at different chemical linkers to pullulan to test efficacy of said linkers in extending the release of rhodamine B (RhB). This study used ether (Pull-Et-RhB), hydrazone (Pull-Hy-RhB), and ester (Pull-Es-RhB) linkers to generate pullulan bioconjugates. Ex vivo modeling of the drug release indicated that the drug diffuses slower in the vitreous humor than in water. The ether bond was stable at differing pH, while the hydrazone and ester bond released the drug faster in more acidic pH, that reflected the pH of endosomes. The Pull-Hy-RhB demonstrated that this drug delivery system was capable of delivering the drug to the retina through testing of the blood in the vessels of the retina.

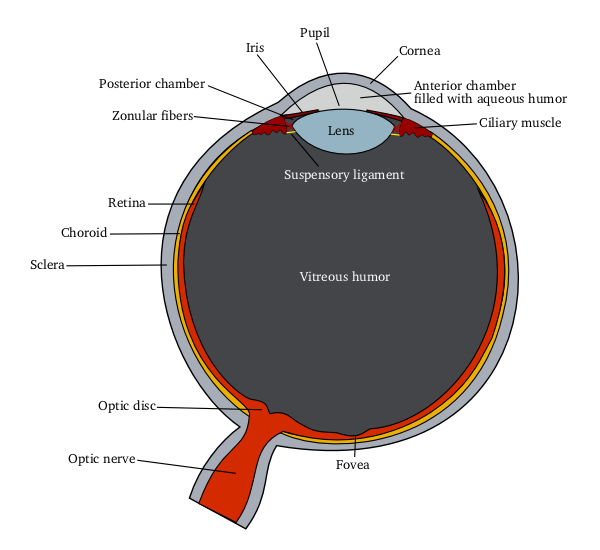
The anatomy of the human eye, including the vitreous body that contains the vitreous humor.

Further studies have investigated the creation and efficacy of pullulan-dexamethasone bioconjugates for intravitreal injections. The study synthesized self-assembling pullulan nanoparticles with dexamethasone attached through hydrazone bonds. This study reiterated that the drug release was fast in acidic pH that mimicked the pH of lysosomes. The variation in drug release was that at the pH of the vitreous humor the drug took two weeks to release half of the drug, while took only two days, when in a lysosomal pH. Pharmacokinetic analysis was performed on this bioconjugate system and revealed that dexamethasone was released in the vitreous humor and that it remained for sixteen days and that a substantial amount of the bioconjugate left the vitreous humor intact. Overall the studies regarding pullulan bioconjugates for the application in intravitreal injections demonstrate that pullulan can provide sustained release as well as allow the drug to reach the retina.

== Other applications ==
Pullulan has many other applications. Pullulan can be used as a scaffold material for stem cells, such as mesenchymal stem cells. Pullulan can be conjugated with photosensitive molecules in order to be used with photodynamic therapy. Pullulan can be modified to be a contrast agent for MRI in multiple ways such as oxidation, iron-oxide conjugates, and cation conjugates. Pullulan has been thiolated in order to generate mucoadhesive properties. This mucoadhesive system has been further modified by polyaminating pullulan to provide sustained drug release. A study developed a transdermal pullulan system that is capable of delivering rivastigmine tartarate in response to external electrical stimuli. Pullulan systems can be loaded with a plethora of different drugs including anti-inflammatory, antilipidemic, and antiglycemic drugs. Pullulan systems can be used to treat heart conditions through the delivery of beta blockers and inhibitors of angiotensin-converting enzyme. Pullulan can also be utilized in regards to bone disease as they can be used to deliver bisphosphonates and can help to image bone regeneration through MRI.
