= Kabatia periclymeni =

Scientific classification
- Domain: Eukaryota
- Kingdom: Fungi
- Division: Ascomycota
- Class: Dothideomycetes
- Order: Dothideales
- Family: Dothioraceae
- Genus: Kabatia
- Species: K. periclymeni

Binomial name
- Kabatia periclymeni (Desm.) M.Morelet

Species of fungus

Kabatia periclymeni is a species of fungus belonging to the family Dothioraceae.

It is native to Europe and Northern America.
