= R-enzyme =

R-enzyme may refer to one of two enzymes:

- Pullulanase
- Limit dextrinase
