= Kabatia =

Scientific classification
- Domain: Eukaryota
- Kingdom: Fungi
- Division: Ascomycota
- Class: Dothideomycetes
- Order: Dothideales
- Family: Dothioraceae
- Genus: Kabatia; Bubák (1904)

Type species
- Kabatia latemarensis Bubák (1904)

Genus of fungi

Kabatia is a genus of fungi belonging to the family Dothioraceae.

The genus was first described by František Bubák.

The generic name Kabatia honours Josef Emanuel Kabát (1849–1925) Czech botanist (Lichenology and Mycology).

The species of this genus are found in Europe and Northern America.

== Species ==
- Kabatia cucubali Buchalo (1961)
- Kabatia fragariae Solheim (1950)
- Kabatia latemarensis Bubák (1904);
- Kabatia lonicerae (Harkn.) Höhn. (1927)
- Kabatia mirabilis Bubák (1905)
- Kabatia naviculispora T.M.Achundov & Melnik (1990)
- Kabatia periclymeni (Desm.) M.Morelet (1975)
- Kabatia persica (Petr.) B.Sutton (1980)
- Kabatia silenes Lobik (1928)
- Kabatia valpellinensis (Traverso) J.C.Krug (1977)
