= Delphinella strobiligena =

Scientific classification
- Domain: Eukaryota
- Kingdom: Fungi
- Division: Ascomycota
- Class: Dothideomycetes
- Order: Dothideales
- Family: Dothioraceae
- Genus: Delphinella
- Species: D. strobiligena

Binomial name
- Delphinella strobiligena (Desm.) Sacc. ex E.Müll. & Arx

Synonyms
- Delphinella strobiligena (Desm.) Sacc.; Didymella strobiligena (Desm.) Sacc.; Glonium strobiligenum (Desm.) Mouton; Hariotia strobiligena (Desm.) P.Karst.; Pleoglonis strobiligena (Desm.) Clem.; Sphaeria strobiligena Desm.

Species of fungi

Delphinella strobiligena is a species of fungus in the family Dothioraceae.
