= Aureobasidium subglaciale =

Scientific classification
- Kingdom: Fungi
- Division: Ascomycota
- Class: Dothideomycetes
- Order: Dothideales
- Family: Dothioraceae
- Genus: Aureobasidium
- Species: A. subglaciale

Binomial name
- Aureobasidium subglaciale Zalar, Gostincar, Gunde-Cimerman (2014)

Species of fungus

Previously classified under the species complex Aureobasidium pullulans, Aureobasidium subglaciale is a black yeast-like, extremophile, ascomycete fungus that is found in extreme cold habitats. The species was originally isolated from subglacial ice of arctic glaciers. The first isolate of this species was obtained from subglacial ice of the Norwegian island Spitsbergen, one of the coldest places inhabited by humans. of Genomic data collected from specimens in the Aureobasidium pullulans complex justified distinction of four different species.

Aureobasidium subglaciale is specifically known for its capability to grow and reproduce at low temperatures. The species could potentially be economically valuable, as recent research has shown promise for the use of A. subglaciale as a biocontrol agent for various post-harvest rot pathogens. The survival of the species at low temperatures is favorable for refrigerated conditions, making this particular species of Aureobasidium of prominent interest. Due to the somewhat recent distinction of A. subglaciale from the A. pullulans species complex, much of the current research does not make the distinction between A. pullulans strains, and thus there is limited information on this species.

== Taxonomy ==
Aureobasidium subglaciale is a member of the Ascomycota division of the kingdom Fungi. It belongs to the class Dothideomycetes, the largest and most diverse class in Ascomycota. The species falls under the order Dothideales and family Dothioraceae. The name subglaciale refers to the fungus being primarily found in subglacial ice. The Aureobasidium genus was first classified in 1891 in Revue Générale de Botanique by Viala, P. and Boyer, G. The genomic differences observed between the four varieties of the A. pullulans species complex are larger than S. cerevisiae and three of its closest relatives. Phylogenetic analyses place the genus Aureobasidium closely related to Kabatiella, a genus known for causing eyespot on leaves.

== Morphology ==
When viewed under a microscope, A. subglaciale has been observed to have hyaline, smooth, thin-walled hyphae that are 2-10 μm wide. The hyphae are sometimes developed in conidiophore-like clusters. Hyaline to dark brown conidia are produced from small denticles in dense groups. Conidia are extremely variable in size, and often have an indistinct hilum. Conidia budding can be seen abundantly. In culture, A. subglaciale is able to 10% NaCl concentrations in culture and grows well between 4°C and 25°C. Colonies on MEA/PDA media at 25°C attained 20 mm diameter after seven days and exhibited abundant sporulation.

== Ecology ==
So far, A. subglaciale specimens have only been isolated from a small number of cold environments, including refrigeration, as well as in radiation polluted soils. A. subglaciale strains are primarily found in subglacial ice or in moss during colder parts of the year.The species tolerates high salinity, radiation contamination, high heavy metal concentrations, and high UV radiation. Most of studied isolates, including the first discovered, were sourced from glaciers of the Norwegian island Spitsbergen. Little is known of the nutritional strategies of A. subglaciale, however genomic analyses show evidence of high metabolic versatility, with high concentrations proteins associated with plant and fungal cell wall degradation.

Heavy metal and radiation tolerance allows A. subglaciale to colonize habitats typically thought to be unwelcoming for life. A strain of A. subglaciale was collected from radiation and heavy-metal polluted soil in the Xinjiang province in China. The radioactive resistance of the strain was found to be associated with the presence of the stress-protecting disaccharide trehalose. Trehalose is primarily produced through the OtsA-OtsB pathway, found in all prokaryotes and eukaryotes. Two highly involved enzymes in this process are trehalose-6-phosphate synthase (TPS) and vacuolar acidic trehalase (ATH), the prior accelerates trehalose production while the latter inhibits it. Mutant strains can be created to overproduce TPS and underproduce ATH, leading to enhanced trehalose production. Mutant strains that overproduced trehalose displayed significantly enhanced resistance characteristics, especially to radiation.

Stress-test experiments have shown that increased salinity triggers intracellular glycerol accumulation in A. subglaciale cultures. Intracellular glycerol accumulation is known to be one of the primary fungal adaptations to salinity and cold stress. Glycerol helps to maintain intracellular osmotic pressure and prevents plasmolysis in high salinity environments; thus, the accumulation of this compound is common in salinity-adapted fungi. Much of what contributes to halotolerance in fungi is still poorly understood, as there are many cell processes that are put under extreme stress under hypersaline conditions, and little is known about how this stress is managed.

== Human Significance ==
There have been several studies conducted that show potential for commercial uses of A. subglaciale as a biocontrol agent and as a bifunctional biocatalyst. At low temperatures, A. subglaciale efficiently transforms acetophenone to phenol via Baeyer-Villiger oxidation. Increasing reaction temperatures allow for changing the chemoselectivity of A. subglaciale F134, and this strain accepts several different aldehydes and ketones as substrates for these reactions. Such microbial processes provide sustainable and energy-effective alternatives to the common ways in which chemicals are synthesized for commercial and medical use. Research has been conducted on the potential for the use of A. subglaciale as a biocontrol agent for post-harvest rot of fruits and vegetables. The ability of A. subglaciale to grow in refrigerated climates makes the species particularly appealing for this use. A. subglaciale strains out-performed other Aureobasidium strains in reducing Botrytis cinerea (grey mold) growth on tomatoes. Another of the studied strains, Aureobasidium melanogeneum, was the least effective at limiting B. cinerea growth. This strain is also a human pathogen, so it is not acceptable for use as a biocontrol agent. A. pullulans produces very similar secondary metabolites and volatile organic compounds. Moreover, A. pullulans has comparable efficacy against B. cinerea as A. subglaciale, however it does not grow nearly as well in refrigerated conditions.

An important concern with regard for the biocontrol potential for A. subglaciale is how it attains iron, an essential growth and development compound, oxygen carrier, and enzyme cofactor. A. subglaciale is able to access bioavailable iron in the environment through the production of siderophores. Siderophores are compounds with high affinity to bind iron. Strains of fungi that produce abundant siderophores have high potential for outcompeting plant pathogens, as iron is a severely limiting resource. All studied A. subglaciale strains in Zajc et al. 2022 produced siderophores, but produced different amounts and different types including the yellow hydroxamate, and the pink catechol siderophores. The only other known producer of catecholate siderophores is Penicillium bilaii. This finding warrants additional study into the properties of these compounds and their chemical importance to the fungus. A. subglaciale visibly performed exceptionally against fungal pathogens B. cinerea and P. expansum on apples, further showing promise for the use of the species as a rot-prevention measure on various crops. On average A. subglaciale reduced necrosis on apples from C. acutatum and B. Cinerea by 74.4% and 71.6% respectively at 10 °C. Aureobasidium pullulans is known to produce several important biotechnological compounds, such as the linear glucosic polysaccharide Pullulan, which has been used for food additive as well as environmental remediation agents. Since A. subglaciale is so closely related to A. pullulans, it is likely to produce similar compounds. However, isolates of A. subglaciale are rare, and little research has been done on the various compounds produced by the strain that could be of economic use.

Little research has evaluated the potential of A. subglaciale as a human pathogen, but there is little evidence to support that potential. The previous grouping of A. subglaciale within the A. pullulans species complex raises concerns as to how much of the current research is valid for A. subglaciale specifically. Since cultures of A. subglaciale are rare and the fungus is extremely difficult to obtain from the environment, knowledge of this species is growing slowly.

== See also ==
- Aureobasidium melanogenum
- Aureobasidium namibiae
- Aureobasidium pullulans
- Yeast in winemaking
