= Delphinella deviata =

Scientific classification
- Domain: Eukaryota
- Kingdom: Fungi
- Division: Ascomycota
- Class: Dothideomycetes
- Order: Dothideales
- Family: Dothioraceae
- Genus: Delphinella
- Species: D. deviata

Binomial name
- Delphinella deviata (Petr.) E.Müll.

Synonyms
- Rehmiellopsis deviata Petr.

Species of fungi

Delphinella deviata is a species of fungus in the family Dothioraceae.
