= Delphinella polyspora =

Scientific classification
- Domain: Eukaryota
- Kingdom: Fungi
- Division: Ascomycota
- Class: Dothideomycetes
- Order: Dothideales
- Family: Dothioraceae
- Genus: Delphinella
- Species: D. polyspora

Binomial name
- Delphinella polyspora (Johanson) E.Müll.

Species of fungi

Delphinella polyspora is a species of fungus in the family Dothioraceae. It is known to grow on the pedicels and fruit of Kalmia procumbens and on Rhododendron indicum.
