= Sydowia polyspora =

Scientific classification
- Domain: Eukaryota
- Kingdom: Fungi
- Division: Ascomycota
- Class: Dothideomycetes
- Order: Dothideales
- Family: Dothioraceae
- Genus: Sydowia
- Species: S. polyspora

Binomial name
- Sydowia polyspora (Bref. & Tavel) E. Müll., (1953)

Synonyms
- Dothichiza ferruginosa Sacc., (1884); Dothichiza pityophila (Corda) Petr., (1923); Dothidea polyspora Bref. Hormonema dematioides Lagerb. & Melin, (1927); Phoma acicola (Moug. & Lév.) Sacc., (1881); Phoma pinicola (Zopf) Sacc., (1884); Phoma pityophila (Corda) Sacc., (1884); Phoma strobiligena Desm., (1849); Pleodothis polyspora (Bref.) Clem. Plowrightia polyspora (Bref.) Sacc., (1895); Pullularia fermentans var. melinii E.S. Wynne & Gott, (1956); Pycnis pinicola Zopf, (1881); Pyrenochaeta acicola (Moug. & Lév.) Sacc., (1884); Sclerophoma pityophila (Corda) Höhn., (1909); Sclerotiopsis pityophila (Corda) Oudem., (1904); Sphaeronaema pithyophilum Corda, (1840); Sphaeropsis acicola Lév., (1848); Sphaeropsis acicola Pass., (1890)

Species of fungus

Sydowia polyspora is a plant pathogen infecting Douglas firs. In Iceland, it has been reported to infect Larix russica, Pinus contorta and Pinus mugo. and on Rhododendron indicum.
