= Delphinella peckii =

Scientific classification
- Domain: Eukaryota
- Kingdom: Fungi
- Division: Ascomycota
- Class: Dothideomycetes
- Order: Dothideales
- Family: Dothioraceae
- Genus: Delphinella
- Species: D. peckii

Binomial name
- Delphinella peckii (Lindau) M.E.Barr (1986)

Synonyms
- Cucurbitaria conigena (Peck) Kuntze; Delphinella tsugae (House) M.E.Barr; Diplosphaerella conigena (Bubák) Tomilin; Mycosphaerella conigena (Bubák) Sacc.; Mycosphaerella conigena (Peck) House; Mycosphaerella peckii Lindau (1897); Mycosphaerella tsugae (House) House; Rehmiellopsis conigena Bubák; Scirrhia conigena (Peck) M.E.Barr; Sphaerella conicola Peck; Sphaerella conigena Peck; Sphaerella peckii Sacc.; Sphaerella tsugae House

Species of fungus

Delphinella peckii is a species of fungus in the family Dothioraceae. It was transferred to the genus Delphinella from the genus Mycosphaerella in 1986.
