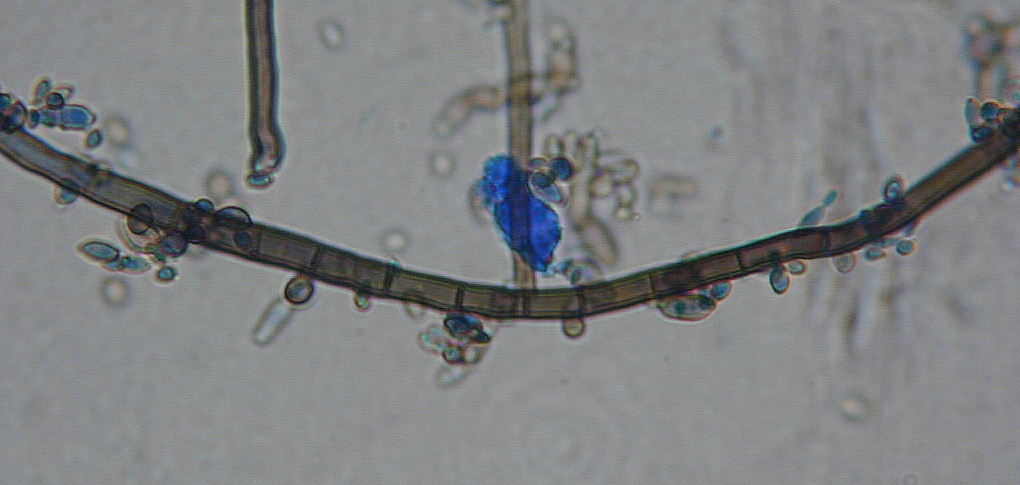
- Aureobasidium pullulans

Scientific classification
- Domain: Eukaryota
- Kingdom: Fungi
- Division: Ascomycota
- Class: Dothideomycetes
- Order: Dothideales
- Family: Dothioraceae
- Genus: Aureobasidium; Viala & G.Boyer (1891)

Type species
- Aureobasidium vitis Viala & G.Boyer (1891)

Synonyms
- Aureobasis Clem. & Shear (1931); Chrysobasidium Clem. (1909)

= Aureobasidium =

Genus of fungi

Aureobasidium is a genus of fungi belonging to the family Dothioraceae.

The genus was first described by Pierre Viala and Gaston Boyer in 1891.

== Species ==
The genus contains 26 species:

- Aureobasidium aleuritis (Vassiljevsky) Herm.-Nijh.
- Aureobasidium apocryptum (Ellis & Everh.) Herm.-Nijh.
- Aureobasidium dalgeri (M.Morelet) Herm.-Nijh.
- Aureobasidium harposporum (Bres. & Sacc.) Herm.-Nijh.
- Aureobasidium indicum A.Pande & Ghate
- Aureobasidium iranianum Arzanlou & Khodaei
- Aureobasidium khasianum J.Pratibha & Prabhug.
- Aureobasidium leucospermi Crous
- Aureobasidium lilii Crişan & Hodişan
- Aureobasidium mangrovei S.Nasr
- Aureobasidium melanogenum (Herm.-Nijh.) Zalar, Gostinčar & Gunde-Cim.
- Aureobasidium microstictum (Bubák) W.B.Cooke
- Aureobasidium namibiae (Zalar, de Hoog & Gunde-Cim.) Zalar, Gostinčar & Gunde-Cim.
- Aureobasidium nigrum (Marpmann) Cif. & Dalla Torre
- Aureobasidium pini C.M.Tian & N.Jiang
- Aureobasidium proteae (Joanne E.Taylor & Crous) Joanne E.Taylor & Crous
- Aureobasidium prunicola (Ellis & Everh.) Herm.-Nijh.
- Aureobasidium pullulans (de Bary & Löwenthal) G.Arnaud
- Aureobasidium ribis (Vassiljevsky) Herm.-Nijh.
- Aureobasidium sanguinariae (Ellis & Everh.) Herm.-Nijh.
- Aureobasidium subglaciale (Zalar, de Hoog & Gunde-Cim.) Zalar, de Hoog & Gunde-Cim.
- Aureobasidium thailandense S.W.Peterson, Manitch. & Leathers
- Aureobasidium thujae-plicatae M.Morelet
- Aureobasidium tremulum Inamdar, Roh.Sharma & Adhapure
- Aureobasidium umbellulariae (J.M.Harv.) Herm.-Nijh.
- Aureobasidium vaccinii Richiţ. & Teodoru
