= Delphinella =

Scientific classification
- Domain: Eukaryota
- Kingdom: Fungi
- Division: Ascomycota
- Class: Dothideomycetes
- Order: Dothideales
- Family: Dothioraceae
- Genus: Delphinella (Sacc.) Kuntze

Genus of fungi

Delphinella is a genus of fungi belonging to the family Dothioraceae.

== Species ==
The genus has 7 accepted species:

- Delphinella abietis (O.Rostr.) E.Müll.
- Delphinella balsameae (Waterman) E.Müll.
- Delphinella deviata (Petr.) E.Müll.
- Delphinella peckii (Lindau) M.E.Barr
- Delphinella polyspora (Johanson) E.Müll.
- Delphinella strobiligena (Desm.) Sacc. ex E.Müll. & Arx
