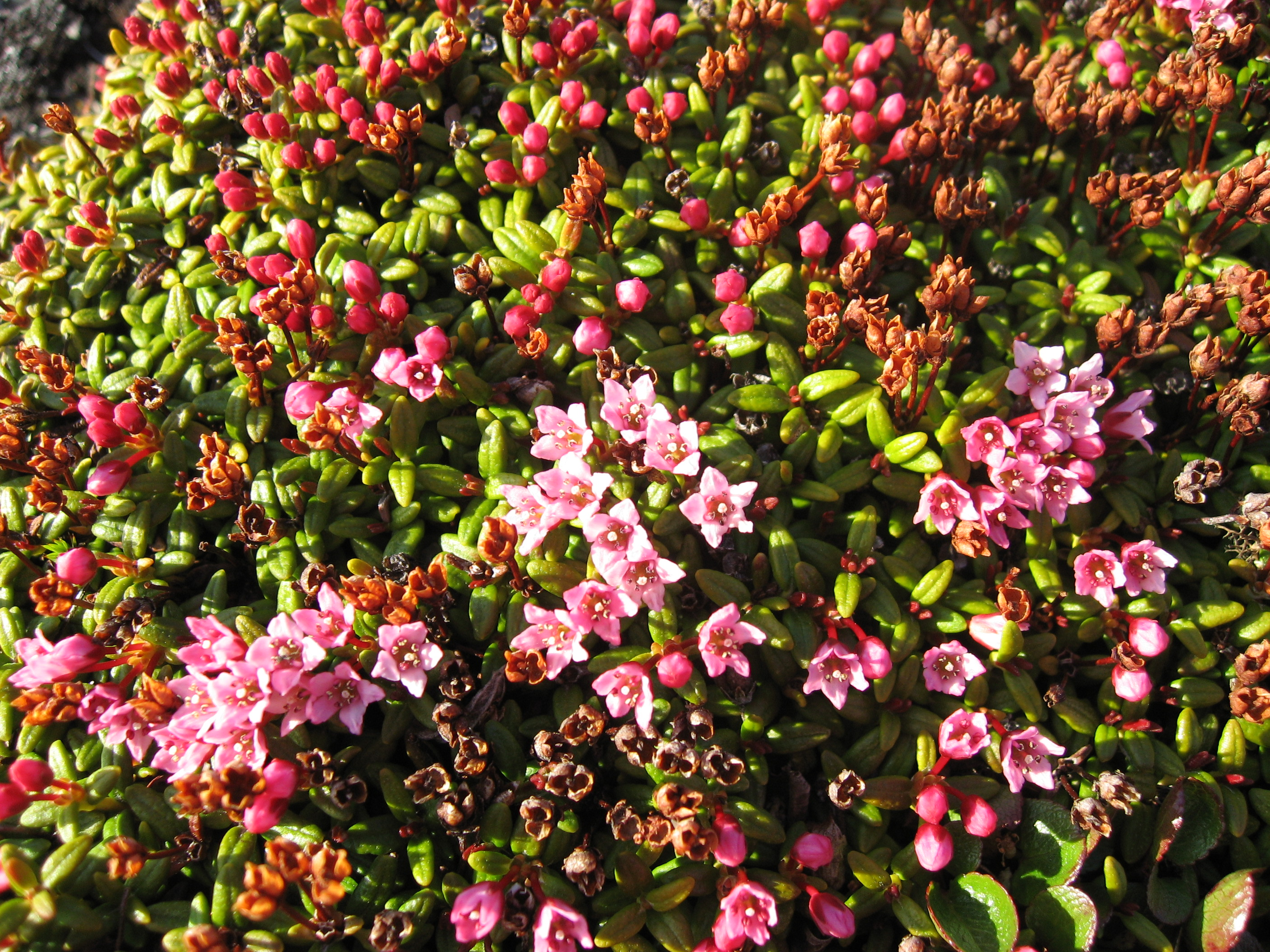

Scientific classification
- Kingdom: Plantae
- Clade: Tracheophytes
- Clade: Angiosperms
- Clade: Eudicots
- Clade: Asterids
- Order: Ericales
- Family: Ericaceae
- Genus: Kalmia
- Species: K. procumbens

Binomial name
- Kalmia procumbens (L.) Gift & Kron & P.F.Stevens ex Galasso, Banfi & F.Conti

Synonyms
- Azalea procumbens L. Chamaecistus procumbens (L.) Kuntze; Loiseleuria procumbens (L.) Desv.

= Kalmia procumbens =

Species of shrub

Kalmia procumbens, commonly known as alpine azalea or trailing azalea, is a dwarf shrub of high mountain regions of the Northern Hemisphere that usually grows no more than 10 centimeters (4 in) tall. Originally named by Linnaeus as Azalea procumbens, it is also named after French botanist L.L.A. Loiseleur-Deslongchamps - Loiseleuria procumbens.

== Distribution ==
Kalmia procumbens is not well known though it is widely distributed. These plants are common in the subarctic regions and high mountains of the northern hemisphere. In North America it reaches the southern limit of its range in the mountains of Maine, New Hampshire, New York, and Washington. It is easy to propagate.

== Habitat and ecology ==
Kalmia procumbens prefers alpine or subalpine, rocky exposed habitat. It grows above treeline with mountain heathers and at lower elevations in bogs.

It is a known host to the microfungus Delphinella polyspora, which grows on its pedicels and fruit.

== Morphology ==
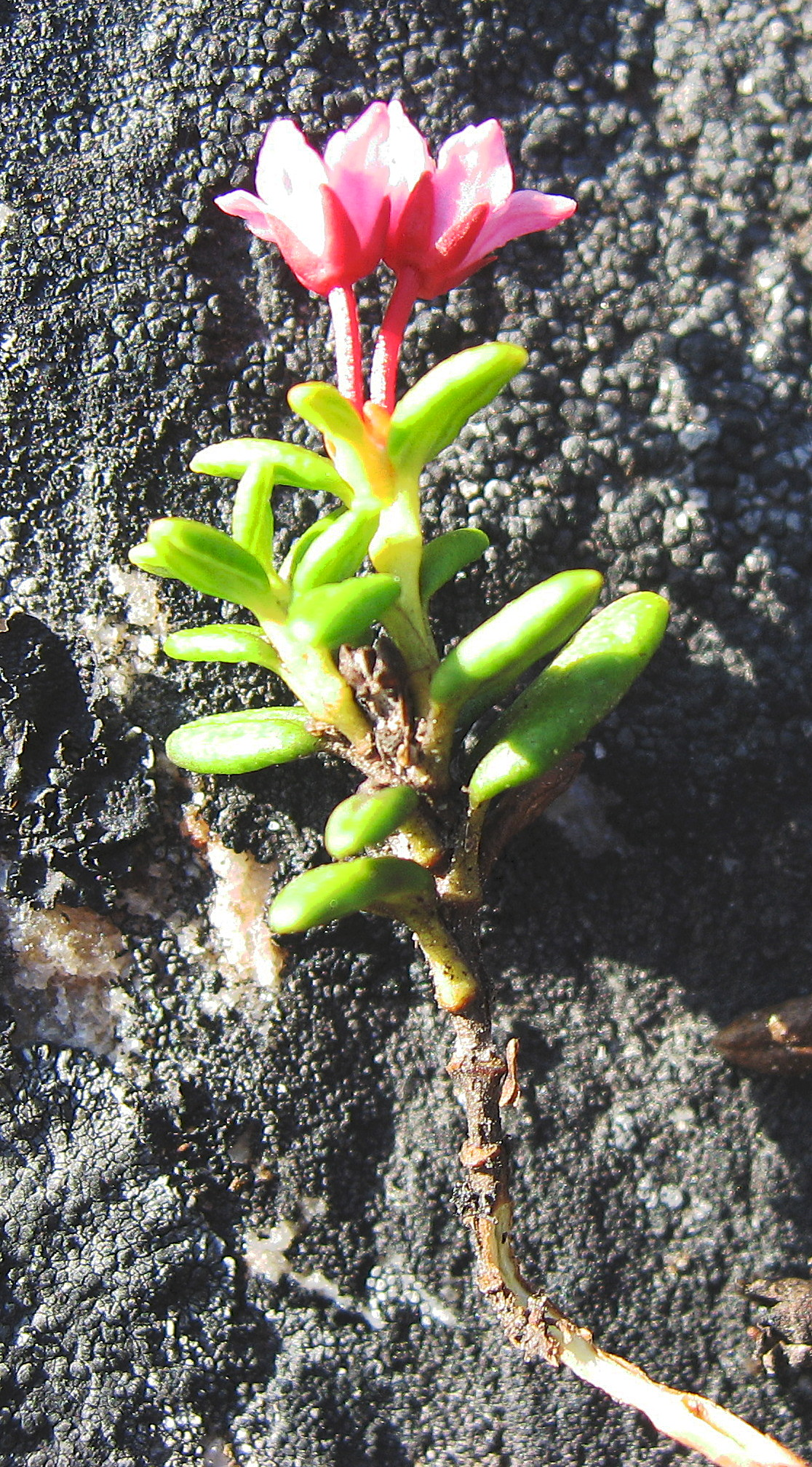
Kalmia procumbens flowers

Individuals of this species are shrubs grown for two to five rose-pink flowers. Its leaves are opposite and its evergreen leaves are leathery blades to 8mm long and have incised margin. Edges are rolled under green on the top and white with dense short hairs underneath.

== Flowers and fruit ==
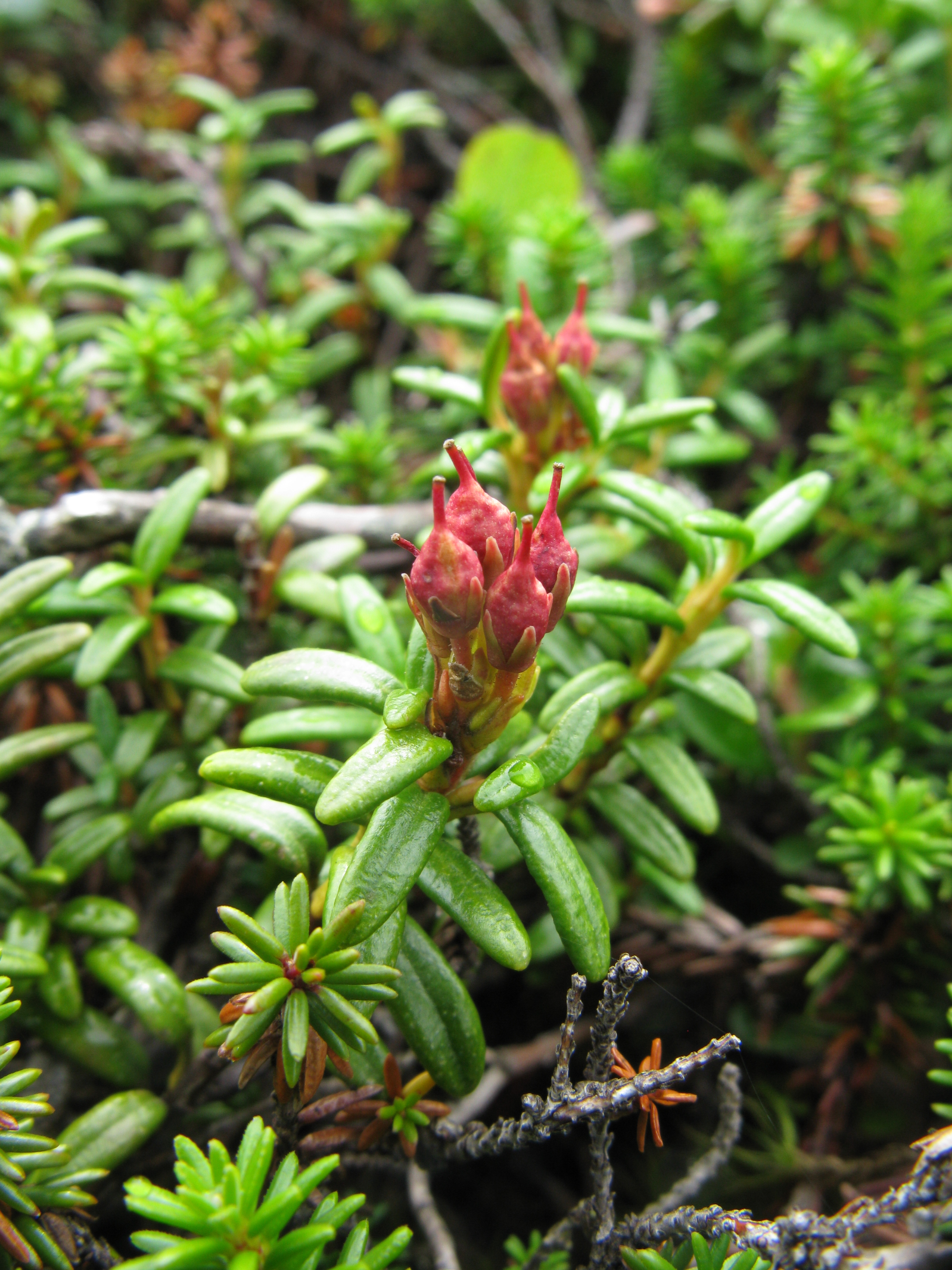
Kalmia procumbens fruits

Flowers of Kalmia procumbens are bell shaped and five lobed, and have five stamens. The flowering time is late spring and summer.

== Notes ==
1. Maine Department of Conservation Natural Areas Program: Loiseleuria procumbens (Alpine Azalea) (2004)
2. Wiley, L. 1969. Rare wild flowers of North America. pp 308–313.
