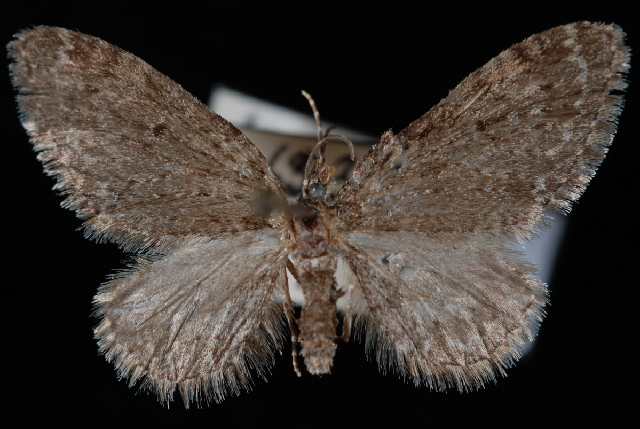

Scientific classification
- Domain: Eukaryota
- Kingdom: Animalia
- Phylum: Arthropoda
- Class: Insecta
- Order: Lepidoptera
- Family: Geometridae
- Genus: Eupithecia
- Species: E. annulata

Binomial name
- Eupithecia annulata (Hulst, 1896)

Synonyms
- Tephroclystia annulata Hulst, 1896; Eupithecia filmata Pearsall, 1908; Eupithecia limnata Pearsall, 1909; Eupithecia orfordata Cassino, 1927; Eupithecia usurpata Pearsall, 1909; Eupithecia vinsullata MacKay, 1951

= Eupithecia annulata =

Larch pug moth

Species of moth

Eupithecia annulata, the larch pug moth, is a moth in the family Geometridae. The species was first described by George Duryea Hulst in 1896. It is found in North America from British Columbia north to the Yukon, east to Newfoundland and Labrador and south to California and Colorado.

The wingspan is about 19 mm. Adults are on wing from April to June.

The larvae feed on Pseudotsuga menziesii, Picea mariana, Picea engelmannii, Picea glauca, Picea engelmannii, Pseudotsuga menziesii var. glauca, Tsuga mertensiana, Tsuga heterophylla, Abies amabilis, Abies grandis, Abies lasiocarpa, Abies lasiocarpa, Quercus garryana, Pinus monticola, Pinus contorta var. latifolia, Larix occidentalis and Thuja plicata. Full-grown larvae reach a length of about 22 mm.
