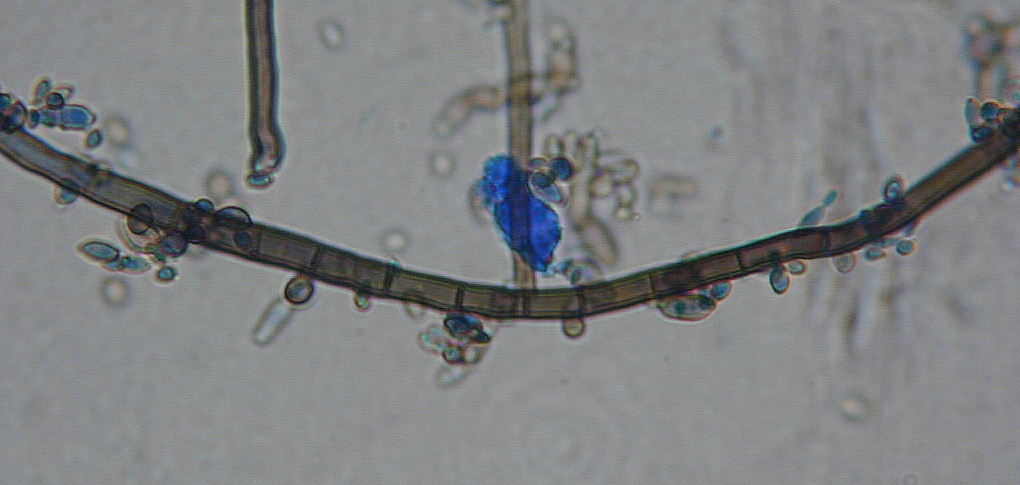

Scientific classification
- Kingdom: Fungi
- Division: Ascomycota
- Class: Dothideomycetes
- Order: Dothideales
- Family: Dothioraceae
- Genus: Aureobasidium
- Species: A. pullulans

Binomial name
- Aureobasidium pullulans (de Bary) G. Arnaud (1918)

Synonyms
- Anthostomella pullulans Aureobasidium oleae Aureobasidium pullulans Azymocandida malicola Candida malicola Cladosporium pullulans Dematium pullulans Exobasidium vitis Hormonema oleae Hormonema pullulans Pullularia fermentans Pullularia fermentans var. schoenii Pullularia pullulans Torula oleae Torula schoenii

= Aureobasidium pullulans =

Species of fungus

Aureobasidium pullulans is a ubiquitous and generalistic black, yeast-like fungus that can be found in different environments (e.g. soil, water, air and limestone). It is well known as a naturally occurring epiphyte or endophyte of a wide range of plant species (e.g. apple, grape, cucumber, green beans, cabbage) without causing any symptoms of disease. A. pullulans has a high importance in biotechnology for the production of different enzymes, siderophores and pullulan. Furthermore, A. pullulans is used in biological control of plant diseases, especially storage diseases.

Chronic human exposure to A. pullulans via humidifiers or air conditioners can lead to hypersensitivity pneumonitis (extrinsic allergic alveolitis) or "humidifier lung". This condition is characterized acutely by dyspnea, cough, fever, chest infiltrates, and acute inflammatory reaction. The condition can also be chronic, and lymphocyte-mediated. The chronic condition is characterized radiographically by reticulonodular infiltrates in the lung, with apical sparing. The strains causing infections in humans were reclassified to A. melanogenum.

A. pullulans can be cultivated on potato dextrose agar, where it produces smooth, faint pink, yeast-like colonies covered with a slimy mass of spores. Older colonies change to black due to chlamydospore production. Primary conidia are hyaline, smooth, ellipsoidal, one-celled, and variable in shape and size; secondary conidia are smaller. Conidiophores are undifferentiated, intercalary or terminal, or arising as short lateral branches. Endoconidia are produced in an intercalary cell and released into a neighboring empty cell. Hyphae are hyaline, smooth, and thinwalled, with transverse septa. The fungus grows at 10–35 °C with optimum growth at 30 °C.

A. pullulans is notable for its phenotypic plasticity. Colony morphology may be affected by carbon source, colony age, temperature, light and substrate, with colonies ranging from homogeneous to sectored, yeast-like to filamentous growth, and from small to large. These changes, potentially influenced by epigenetic factors, and the particular developmental sequences that the colonies proceed through may be observed with the naked eye. Besides these morphological plasticity A. pullulans is also adaptable to various stressful conditions: hypersaline, acidic and alkaline, cold, and oligotrophic. Therefore, it is considered to be polyextremotolerant.

The morphology-based taxonomy of the species is complicated by the large morphological variability between strains and even within a single strain. Based on molecular analyses, four varieties of the species A. pullulans were recognised: var. pullulans from substrates with low water activity and the phyllosphere and a variety of other habitats; var. melanogenum from aquatic habitats; var. subglaciale from glacial habitats; and var. namibiae, which was described on the basis of only one strain isolated from dolomitic marble in Namibia. However, when the genome sequences of these varieties became available, the differences between them were considered as too large to be accommodated in a single species. Therefore, the varieties were reclassified as new species: A. pullulans, A. melanogenum, A. subglaciale, and A. namibiae.

The genome of A. pullulans s. str. contains large numbers of genes of gene families that can be linked to the nutritional versatility of the species and its stress tolerance. The genome also contains a homothallic mating-type locus. Further genome sequencing of fifty A. pullulans s. str. strains showed that the population of the species is homogeneous, with high levels of recombination and good dispersal. The species A. pullulans was thus recognised as a true generalist, able to inhabit a wide variety of habitats with no specialization to any of these habitats at the genomic level. Despite the presence in the genome of a putative mating locus, and the observation of high recombination rates, no sexual cycle has yet been reported in this organism.

Due to the relatively recent redefinition of the species, most published work does not yet distinguish between the new species belonging to the previously recognised A. pullulans species complex. It is therefore not clear to what extent this knowledge is valid for A. pullulans s. str. and what should be attributed to the three new species.

== See also ==
- Aureobasidium melanogenum
- Aureobasidium namibiae
- Aureobasidium subglaciale
- Yeast in winemaking
