= Sydowia =

Scientific classification
- Kingdom: Fungi
- Division: Ascomycota
- Class: Dothideomycetes
- Order: Dothideales
- Family: Dothioraceae
- Genus: Sydowia; Bres. (1895)

Type species
- Sydowia gregaria Bres. (1895)

Species
- See text

Genus of fungi

Sydowia is a genus of fungi in the family Dothioraceae described by Giacomo Bresadola in 1895. The name honours German mycologist, Paul Sydow.

== Species ==
As accepted by Species Fungorum;

- Sydowia agharkarii T.S. Viswan. (1960)
- Sydowia ceanothi M.E. Barr (2001)
- Sydowia gregaria Bres. (1895)
- Sydowia japonica (Kasai) Hirooka & Masuya (2012)
- Sydowia polyspora (Bref. & Tavel) E. Müll. (1953)
- Sydowia prosopidis R. Rao (1972)
- Sydowia randiae R. Rao & Modak (1974)
- Sydowia semenospora A. Funk & Finck (1988)
- Sydowia slippii (M.E. Barr) M.E. Barr (2001)
- Sydowia solitaria Lungescu & Morariu (1973)
- Sydowia wolfii (M.E. Barr) M.E. Barr (2001)

Former species;

- Sydowia dothideoides Dearn. & Barthol. (1926) = Dothiora dothideoides, Botryosphaeriaceae
- Sydowia eucalypti (Verwoerd & du Plessis) Crous (2003) = Pseudosydowia eucalypti, Saccotheciaceae
- Sydowia lepargyrea Dearn. ex M.E. Barr (1972) = Dothiora lepargyrea, Botryosphaeriaceae
- Sydowia pruni M.E. Barr (1972) = Dothiora pruni, Botryosphaeriaceae
- Sydowia taxicola (Peck) M.E. Barr (2001) = Dothiora taxicola, Botryosphaeriaceae
- Sydowia versiformis M.E. Barr (1972) = Dothiora versiformis, Botryosphaeriaceae
