= Dothiora =

Scientific classification
- Domain: Eukaryota
- Kingdom: Fungi
- Division: Ascomycota
- Class: Dothideomycetes
- Order: Dothideales
- Family: Dothioraceae
- Genus: Dothiora; Fr.

Synonyms
- Coleonaema Höhn.; Cylindroseptoria Quaedvlieg, Verkley & Crous; Jaapia Kirschstein, 1938; Keisslerina Petrak, 1920; Metadothis (Sacc.) Sacc.; Stigmea Bonorden, 1864

Genus of fungi

Dothiora is a genus of fungi belonging to the family Dothioraceae.

The genus has almost cosmopolitan distribution.

== Species ==
The genus Dothiora contains 54 species.

- Dothiora agapanthi Crous
- Dothiora amelanchieris M.E.Barr
- Dothiora bupleuricola Crous
- Dothiora buxi Jayasiri, Camporesi & K.D.Hyde
- Dothiora cactacearum Crous
- Dothiora cannabinae Froid.
- Dothiora ceratoniae (Quaedvl., Verkley & Crous) Crous
- Dothiora coronillae Dissan., Camporesi & K.D.Hyde
- Dothiora corymbiae Crous
- Dothiora cytisi (Wanas., Camporesi, E.B.G.Jones & K.D.Hyde) Crous
- Dothiora dothideoides (Dearn. & Barthol.) M.E.Barr
- Dothiora elliptica Fuckel
- Dothiora ellisii (M.E.Barr) Shoemaker & C.E.Babc.
- Dothiora europaea Froid.
- Dothiora harknessii (Ellis & Everh.) M.E.Barr
- Dothiora hederae Froid.
- Dothiora infuscans Rodr.-Andr., Stchigel, Guarro & Cano
- Dothiora laureolae Froid.
- Dothiora lepargyrea (Dearn. ex M.E.Barr) M.E.Barr
- Dothiora maculans (Ellis & Everh.) Crous
- Dothiora mahoniae (A.W.Ramaley) Crous
- Dothiora meynae R.Rao
- Dothiora moravia (Petr.) Froidevaux
- Dothiora moravica (Petr.) Froid.
- Dothiora oleae (DC.) Crous
- Dothiora petrakiana (Rehm) Petr.
- Dothiora phaeosperma Froid.
- Dothiora phillyreae Crous
- Dothiora pinacea Velen.
- Dothiora pistaciae (Quaedvl., Verkley & Crous) Crous
- Dothiora polyspora Shear & R.W.Davidson
- Dothiora pruni (M.E.Barr) M.E.Barr
- Dothiora pruni-padi Froid.
- Dothiora prunorum (C.Dennis & Buhagiar) Crous
- Dothiora rhamni-alpinae Froid.
- Dothiora ribesia (Pers.) M.E.Barr
- Dothiora rimincola (Schwein.) M.E.Barr
- Dothiora salicis Vleugel
- Dothiora sambucina (Peck) M.E.Barr
- Dothiora schizospora Luttr.
- Dothiora sorbi (Wahlenb.) Fuckel
- Dothiora spartii Dissan., Camporesi & K.D.Hyde
- Dothiora sphaerioides (Pers.) Fr.
- Dothiora sphaeroides (Pers.) Fr.
- Dothiora staphyleae Allesch.
- Dothiora staphylina (Peck) M.E.Barr
- Dothiora stictoides (Berk. & M.A.Curtis) Y.M.Ahn & Shearer
- Dothiora symploci Petch
- Dothiora tamaricis Dennis & Spooner
- Dothiora taxicola (Peck) M.E.Barr
- Dothiora thujae (Grove) M.E.Barr
- Dothiora valdiviana Butin
- Dothiora versiformis (M.E.Barr) M.E.Barr
- Dothiora viburnicola Crous
