= Limit dextrinase =

Identifiers
- EC no.: 3.2.1.142

Databases
- IntEnz: IntEnz view
- BRENDA: BRENDA entry
- ExPASy: NiceZyme view
- KEGG: KEGG entry
- MetaCyc: metabolic pathway
- PRIAM: profile
- PDB structures: RCSB PDB PDBe PDBsum
Search
- PMC: articles
- PubMed: articles
- NCBI: proteins

Limit dextrinase (EC 3.2.1.142, R-enzyme, amylopectin-1,6-glucosidase, dextrin alpha-1,6-glucanohydrolase) is an enzyme with systematic name dextrin 6-alpha-glucanohydrolase. This enzyme catalyses the hydrolysis of (1->6)-alpha-D-glucosidic linkages in alpha- and beta-limits dextrins of amylopectin and glycogen, in amylopectin and pullulan.

== See also ==
- Sucrase-isomaltase, an enzyme
- Pullulanase, an enzyme
