= Isopullulanase =

Identifiers
- EC no.: 3.2.1.57
- CAS no.: 37288-43-0

Databases
- IntEnz: IntEnz view
- BRENDA: BRENDA entry
- ExPASy: NiceZyme view
- KEGG: KEGG entry
- MetaCyc: metabolic pathway
- PRIAM: profile
- PDB structures: RCSB PDB PDBe PDBsum
Search
- PMC: articles
- PubMed: articles
- NCBI: proteins

The enzyme isopullulanase (EC 3.2.1.57) has systematic name pullulan 4-glucanohydrolase (isopanose-forming), and catalyses the hydrolysis of pullulan to isopanose (6-α-maltosylglucose). It has no activity on starch.
