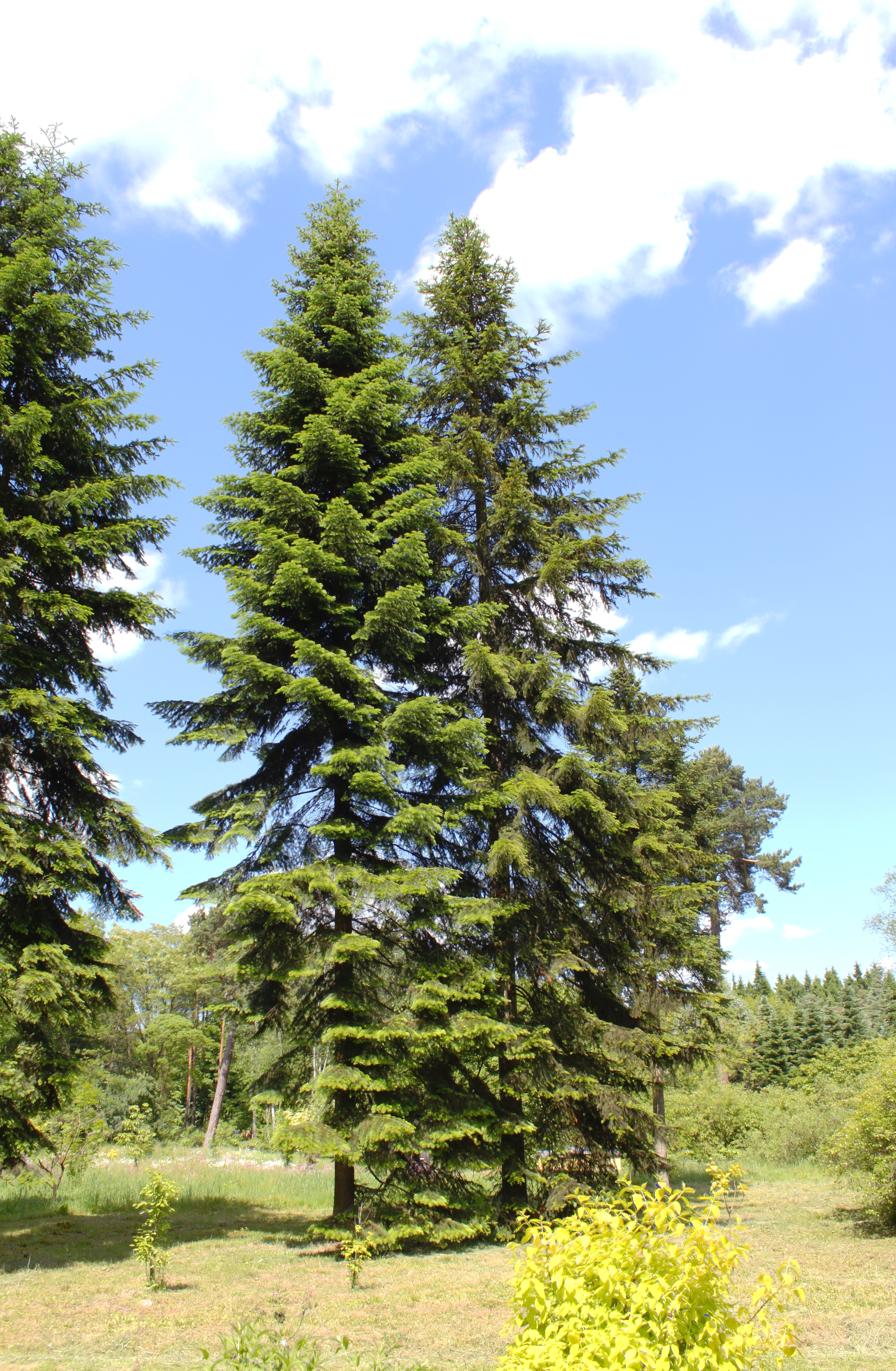

Conservation status
- Least Concern (IUCN 3.1)

Scientific classification
- Kingdom: Plantae
- Clade: Tracheophytes
- Clade: Gymnospermae
- Division: Pinophyta
- Class: Pinopsida
- Order: Pinales
- Family: Pinaceae
- Genus: Abies
- Species: A. sibirica

Binomial name
- Abies sibirica Ledeb.

= Abies sibirica =

Abies sibirica Siberian fir

Species of conifer

Abies sibirica, the Siberian fir, is a coniferous evergreen tree native to the taiga east of the Volga River and south of 67°40' North latitude in Siberia through Turkestan, northeast Xinjiang, Mongolia and Heilongjiang.

== Distribution ==
The tree lives in the cold boreal climate on moist soils in mountains or river basins at elevations of 1,900–2,400 metres (6,200–7,900 ft). It is very shade-tolerant, frost-resistant, and hardy, surviving temperatures down to −50 °C (−58 °F). It rarely lives over 200 years due to the susceptibility to fungal decay in the wood.

== Description ==
Siberian fir, Abies sibirica, grows 30–35 metres (98–115 ft) tall with a trunk diameter of 0.5–1 metre (1 ft 8 in – 3 ft 3 in) at breast height and a conical crown. The bark is grey-green to grey-brown and smooth with resin blisters typical of most firs. Shoots are yellow-grey, resinous, and slightly pubescent. The leaves are needle-like, 2–3 centimetres (0.79–1.18 in) long and 1.5 millimetres (0.059 in) broad on average. They are light green above with two grey-white stomatal bands underneath, and are directed upwards along the stem. They are soft, flattened, and strongly aromatic. The cones are cylindrical, 5–9.5 centimetres (2.0–3.7 in) long and 2.5–3.5 centimetres (0.98–1.38 in) broad, with small bracts hidden by the scales. They ripen from bluish to brown or dark brown in mid-autumn. The seeds, 7 millimetres (0.28 in) long with a triangular wing 0.7–1.3 centimetres (0.28–0.51 in) long, are released when the cone disintegrates after maturity.

=== Varieties ===
There are two varieties:

- Abies sibirica var. sibirica. Described above.
- Abies sibirica var. semenovii (B. Fedtschenko) Farjon. Endemic in Kyrgyzstan. Branchlets noticeably ridged and grooved. Resin canals marginal. Cones yellow-brown, with broader bracts than those of var. sibirica.

== Ecology ==
Abies sibirica is subject to infection from the fungus Delphinella balsameae which was reported from Russia for the first time in 2003.

== Uses ==
Essential oils extracted from the leaves are used in aromatherapy and perfumes. The wood is soft, lightweight, and weak. It is used in construction, furniture, and wood pulp.
