= Kathleen Anne Kron =

American botanist

- Born: 1956 (age 69–70)
- Occupation: Professor

Academic background
- Education: Michigan State University
- Alma mater: University of Florida
- Thesis: A taxonomic revision of Rhododendron L. section Pentanthera g. don (Ericaceae) (1987)

Academic work
- Discipline: Biology
- Sub-discipline: Botany
- Institutions: Wake Forest University
- Main interests: Large-scale relationships between flowering plants

Kathleen Anne Kron (born 1956) is a retired biology professor from Wake Forest University. She is known for her research on Ericaceae, a family of flowering plants.

== Education ==
Kron received her bachelor's degree and her master's degree from Michigan State University in 1979 and 1982 respectively. She received her doctorate from the University of Florida in 1987. In 2020, she retired as full professor from Wake Forest University.

Kron ran a lab concerned with the large-scale relationships between flowering plants using Ericaceae as a model organism. In 2011, Rhododendron kroniae Craven, was named in honor of Kron and her work defining the evolutionary relationships within Ericaceae. Rhododendron groenlandicum (Oeder) Kron & Judd is named after Georg Christian Oeder, whose work was amended by Kron and Walter Stephen Judd.

The standard author abbreviation Kron is used to indicate this person as the author when citing a botanical name.

== Selected publications ==
- Kron, K. A.; Judd, W. S.; Stevens, P. F.; Crayn, D. M.; Anderberg, A. A.; Gadek, P. A.; Quinn, C. J.; Luteyn, J. L. (2002). "Phylogenetic Classification of Ericaceae: Molecular and Morphological Evidence". The Botanical Review. 68 (3): 335–423. doi:10.1663/0006-8101(2002)068[0335:PCOEMA]2.0.CO;2. ISSN 0006-8101. S2CID 35699816.
- Chase, Mark W.; Soltis, Douglas E.; Olmstead, Richard G.; Morgan, David; Les, Donald H.; Mishler, Brent D.; Duvall, Melvin R.; Price, Robert A.; Hills, Harold G.; Qiu, Yin-Long; Kron, Kathleen A. (1993). "Phylogenetics of Seed Plants: An Analysis of Nucleotide Sequences from the Plastid Gene rbcL" (PDF). Annals of the Missouri Botanical Garden. 80 (3): 528. doi:10.2307/2399846. JSTOR 2399846.
- Kron, Kathleen A.; Chase, Mark W. (1993). "Systematics of the Ericaceae, Empetraceae, Epacridaceae and Related Taxa Based Upon rbcL Sequence Data". Annals of the Missouri Botanical Garden. 80 (3): 735. doi:10.2307/2399857. JSTOR 2399857.
