= Endoconidium =

Scientific classification
- Kingdom: Fungi
- Division: Ascomycota
- Class: Leotiomycetes
- Order: Helotiales
- Genus: Endoconidium; Prill. & Delacr.

Genus of fungi

Endoconidium is a genus of fungi. The species Endoconidium temulentum grows on the grass Lolium temulentum or darnel grass and is possibly responsible for the grass's toxic effects.
