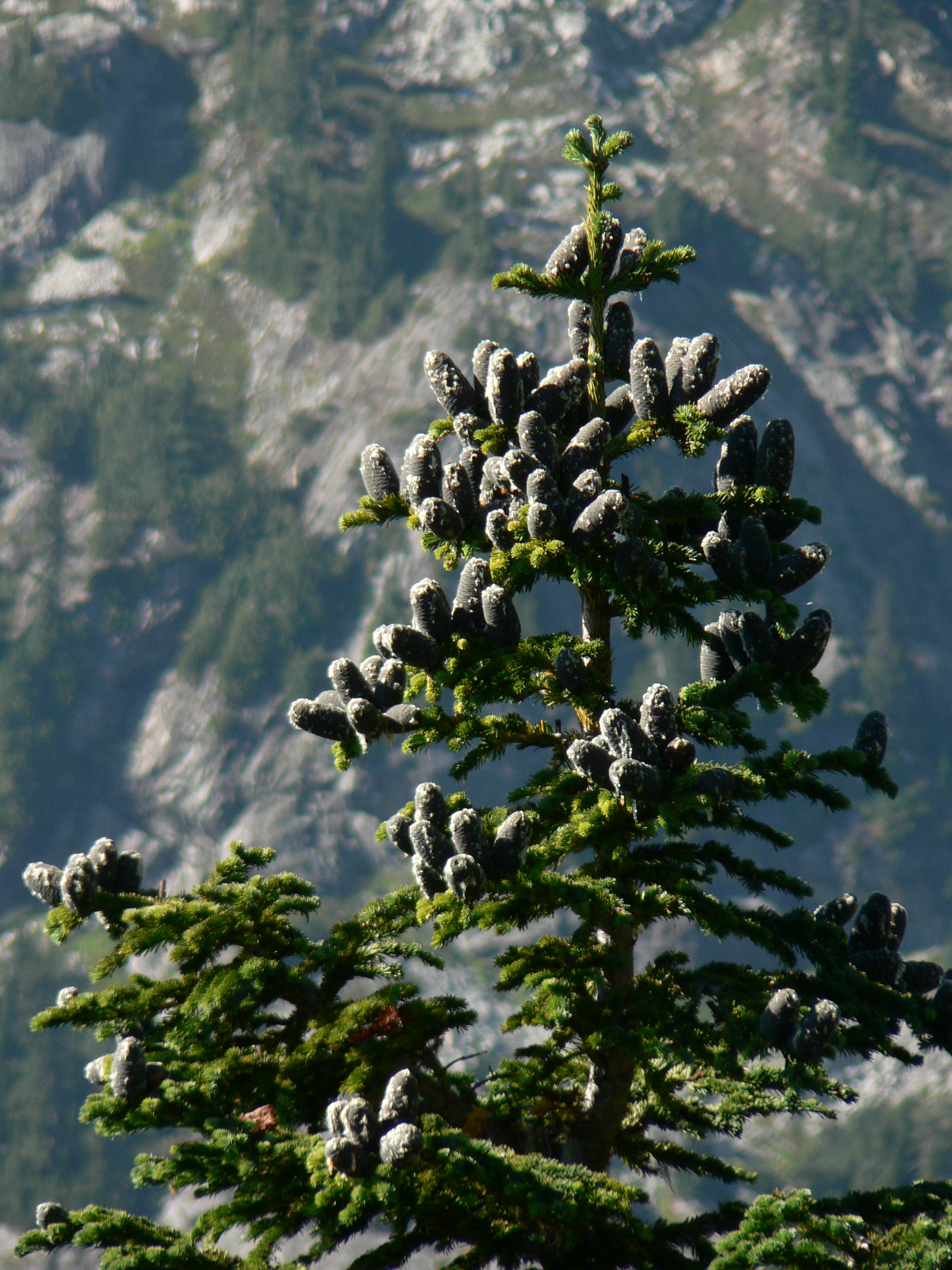
- Specimen in North Cascades National Park

Conservation status
- Least Concern (IUCN 3.1)

- Secure (NatureServe)

Scientific classification
- Kingdom: Plantae
- Clade: Tracheophytes
- Clade: Gymnospermae
- Division: Pinophyta
- Class: Pinopsida
- Order: Pinales
- Family: Pinaceae
- Genus: Abies
- Species: A. lasiocarpa

Binomial name
- Abies lasiocarpa (Hook.) Nutt.
- Abies lasiocarpa var. arizonica (Merriam) Lemmon; Abies lasiocarpa var. lasiocarpa
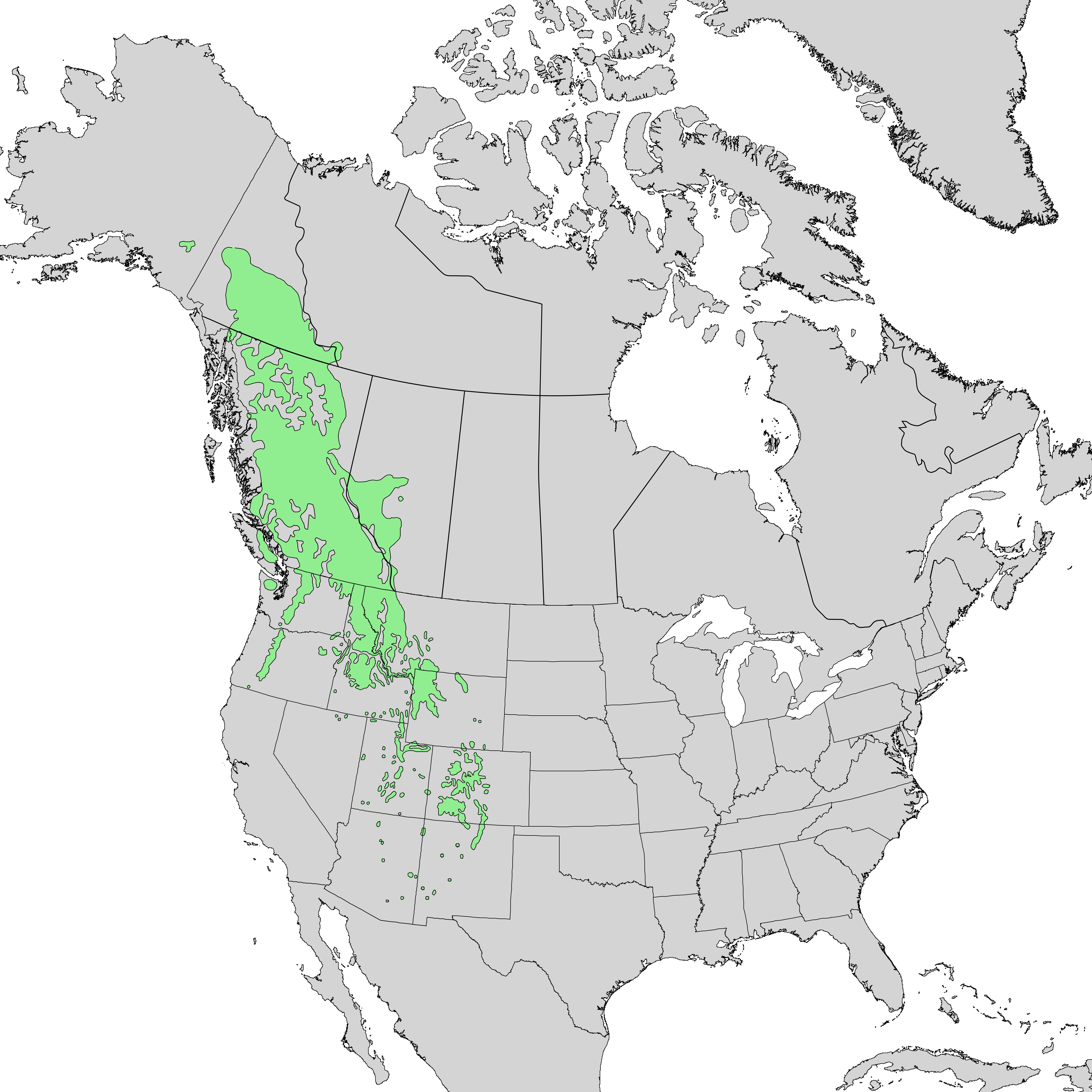
- Natural range

Synonyms
- List: Abies balsamea subsp. lasiocarpa (Hook.) B.Boivin (1959); Abies grandis var. lasiocarpa (Hook.) Lavallée (1877); Picea lasiocarpa (Hook.) A.Murray (1875); Pinus lasiocarpa Hook. (1838)

= Abies lasiocarpa =

North American fir tree species

Abies lasiocarpa, the subalpine fir or Rocky Mountain fir, is a western North American fir tree.

== Description ==
Abies lasiocarpa is a medium-sized evergreen conifer with a very narrow conic crown, growing to 20 metres (66 ft) tall, exceptionally 40–50 m (130–160 ft), with a trunk up to 1 m (3 ft 3 in) thick, exceptionally 2.1 m (6 ft 11 in). The bark on young trees is smooth, gray, and with resin blisters, becoming rough and fissured or scaly on old trees. The lowest branches can be observed growing 1 m (3 ft 3 in) above ground level. The leaves are flat and needle-like, 1.5–3 centimetres (5/8–1 1/8 in) long, glaucous green above with a broad stripe of stomata, and two blue-white stomatal bands below; the fresh leaf scars are reddish (tan on the inland variety). They are arranged spirally on the shoot, but with the leaf bases twisted to be arranged to the sides of and above the shoot, with few or none below the shoot. The cones are erect, 6–12 cm (2 1/4–4 3/4 in) long, dark purple with fine yellow-brown pubescence, ripening brown and disintegrating to release the winged seeds in early fall.

== Taxonomy ==
There are two or three taxa in subalpine fir, treated very differently by different authors:

- The Coast Range subalpine fir (Abies lasiocarpa) in the narrow sense, is the typical form of the species, occurring in the Pacific Coast Ranges, the Olympic Mountains and the Cascade Range from Southeast Alaska (Panhandle mountains) south to California.
- The Rocky Mountains subalpine fir is very closely related and of disputed status, being variously treated as a distinct species Abies bifolia, as a variety of Coast Range subalpine fir Abies lasiocarpa var. bifolia, or not distinguished from typical A. lasiocarpa at all. It occurs in the Rocky Mountains from Southeast Alaska (eastern Alaska Range) south to Colorado. It differs primarily in the chemical composition of its resin, microscopic features, and in the fresh leaf scars being yellow-brown, not reddish. The Flora of North America treats it as a distinct species, while the United States Department of Agriculture (USDA) includes it within A. lasiocarpa without distinction.
- The corkbark fir Abies lasiocarpa var. arizonica occurs in Arizona and New Mexico. It differs in thicker, corky bark and more strongly glaucous foliage. In resin composition it is closer to A. bifolia than to typical A. lasiocarpa, though the combination "Abies bifolia var. arizonica" has not been formally published. The Flora of North America includes it within A. bifolia without distinction; the USDA treats it as a distinct variety of A. lasiocarpa.

== Distribution ==
The species is native to the mountains of Yukon, British Columbia and western Alberta in Western Canada; and to Southeast Alaska, Washington, Oregon, Idaho, Western Montana, Wyoming, Utah, Colorado, New Mexico, Arizona, northeastern Nevada, and the Trinity Alps of the Klamath Mountains in northwestern California in the Western United States.

It occurs at high altitudes, commonly found at and immediately below the tree line. It can be found at elevations of 300–900 m (980–2,950 ft) in the north of the range (rarely down to sea level in the far north), to 2,400–3,650 m (7,870–11,980 ft) in the south of the range. West of the Cascade ridge, it can be found at elevations of 1,200–2,000 m (3,900–6,600 ft), while further east (particularly in Western Montana) it can be found from 1,500 to 2,700 m (4,900 to 8,900 ft).

== Ecology ==
Annual precipitation ranges from 380 cm (150 in) in coastal mountain sites to only 65 cm (26 in) inland. Snow gathered on the branches helps protect them from wind and heat. Firs in general act as a snow fence, leading to the creation of meadows through extra moisture accumulation.

The tree is highly shade tolerant, but very vulnerable to fire, short-lived, and slow-growing. Despite having weaker wood than some of its timberline associates, it can survive by its ability to adapt (growing in a krummholz form) and reproduce via layering in clusters at high elevations. At timberline, a single tree can leave behind a ring of trees (an 'atoll') via layering. The species has benefited from wildfire suppression in more recent years.

Various animals, including mountain goats, take shelter in subalpine fir clusters and krummholz. The bark is browsed by game animals and its leaves are eaten by grouse. Songbirds, Richardson's grouse, Cascade pine squirrels, and other mammals consume the seeds. It is host to pathogenic fungi such as the species Delphinella balsameae.

== Uses ==
Native Americans used the leaves as deodorant and burned them as incense or medicinal vapor. Powdered bark and other components were used in solutions to treat colds. Resin was used to dress wounds or chewed as gum. The tree boughs were used for bedding. Some Plateau Indian tribes drank or washed in a subalpine fir boil for purification or to make their hair grow.

The light wood is considered poor quality, but sometimes used for wood pulp, general structural purposes and paper manufacture. It is also a popular Christmas tree. It is a popular ornamental tree for parks and large gardens, grown for its strongly glaucous-blue foliage. It can also function as a bonsai. The cultivar Abies lasiocarpa var. arizonica 'Compacta' is suitable for smaller gardens, growing as a shrub to 4 m (13 ft) tall by 1.5 m (4 ft 11 in) broad. In the UK It has gained the Royal Horticultural Society's Award of Garden Merit.

The largest-known specimen, measuring 2.1 m (6 ft 11 in) thick and 39 m (129 ft) tall, had a small door in its trunk and a storage space, which the film crew of the Disney-produced documentary The Olympic Elk (1952) used to store equipment.

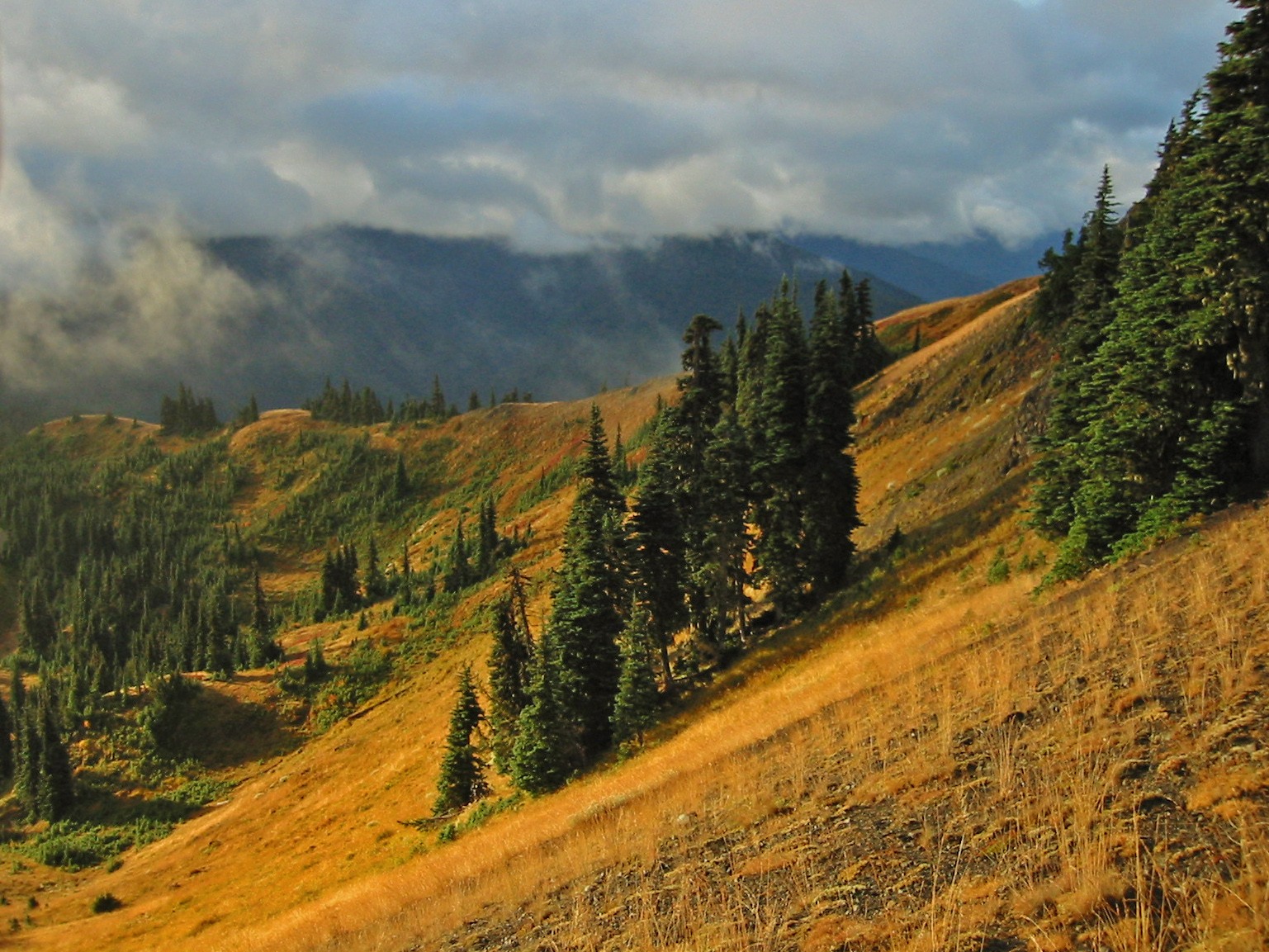
Specimen in Olympic National Park in mid-September

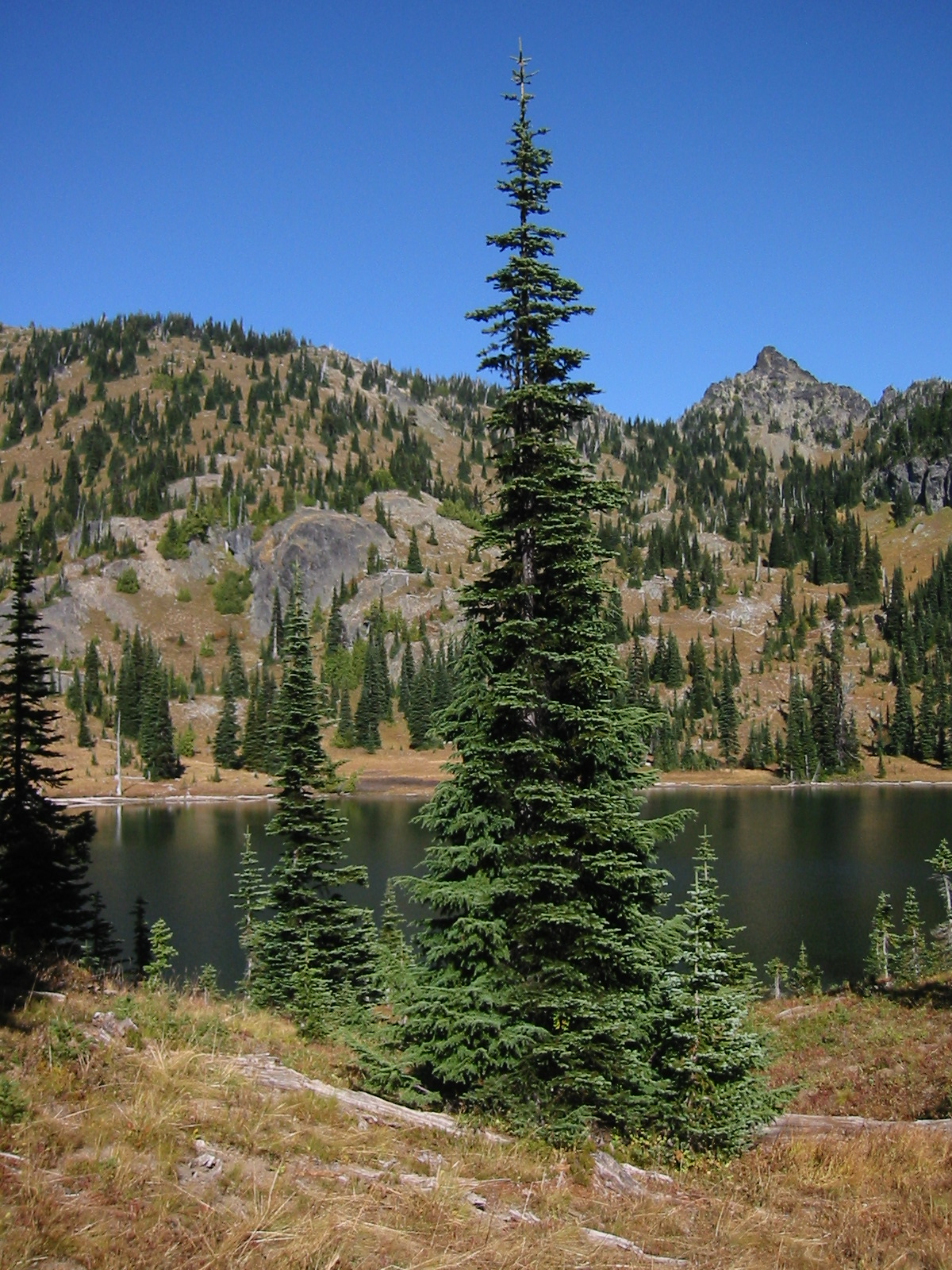
Specimen in Mount Rainier National Park in late September
