= Pullulanase =

Enzyme

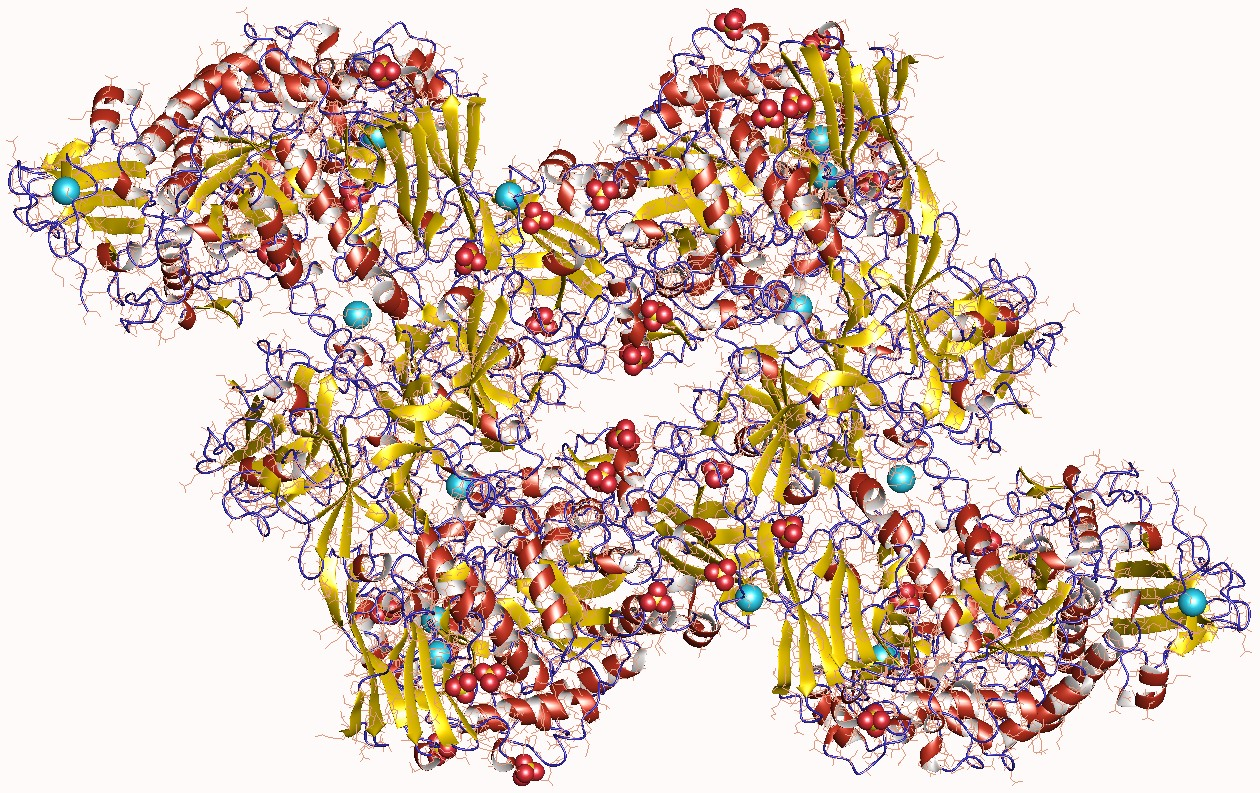
- Debranching enzyme homotetramer, Klebsiella oxytoca

Identifiers
- EC no.: 3.2.1.41
- CAS no.: 9075-68-7

Databases
- IntEnz: IntEnz view
- BRENDA: BRENDA entry
- ExPASy: NiceZyme view
- KEGG: KEGG entry
- MetaCyc: metabolic pathway
- PRIAM: profile
- PDB structures: RCSB PDB PDBe PDBsum
Search
- PMC: articles
- PubMed: articles
- NCBI: proteins

Pullulanase (EC 3.2.1.41, limit dextrinase, amylopectin 6-glucanohydrolase, bacterial debranching enzyme, debranching enzyme, α-dextrin endo-1,6-α-glucosidase, R-enzyme, pullulan α-1,6-glucanohydrolase) is a specific kind of glucanase, an amylolytic exoenzyme, that degrades pullulan. It is produced as an extracellular, cell surface-anchored lipoprotein by Gram-negative bacteria of the genus Klebsiella. Type I pullulanases specifically attack α-1,6 linkages, while type II pullulanases are also able to hydrolyse α-1,4 linkages. It is also produced by some other bacteria and archaea. Pullulanase is used as a processing aid in grain processing biotechnology (production of ethanol and sweeteners).

Pullulanase is also known as pullulan-6-glucanohydrolase (Debranching enzyme). Its substrate, pullulan, is regarded as a chain of maltotriose units linked by α-1,6-glycosidic bonds. Pullulanase will hydrolytically cleave pullulan (α-glucan polysaccharides).

== Pullulanase enzyme in the food industry ==
In the food industry, pullulanase works well as an ingredient. Pullulan can be applied directly to foods as a protective glaze or edible film due to its ability to form films. It can be used as a spice and flavoring agent for micro-encapsulation. It is used in mayonnaise to maintain consistency and quality. It is additionally used in low-calorie food formulations as a starch replacement.

Pullulanase can be used to convert starches in grains into fermentable sugars, which yeast can use to produce alcohol during fermentation.
