= Pullulan =

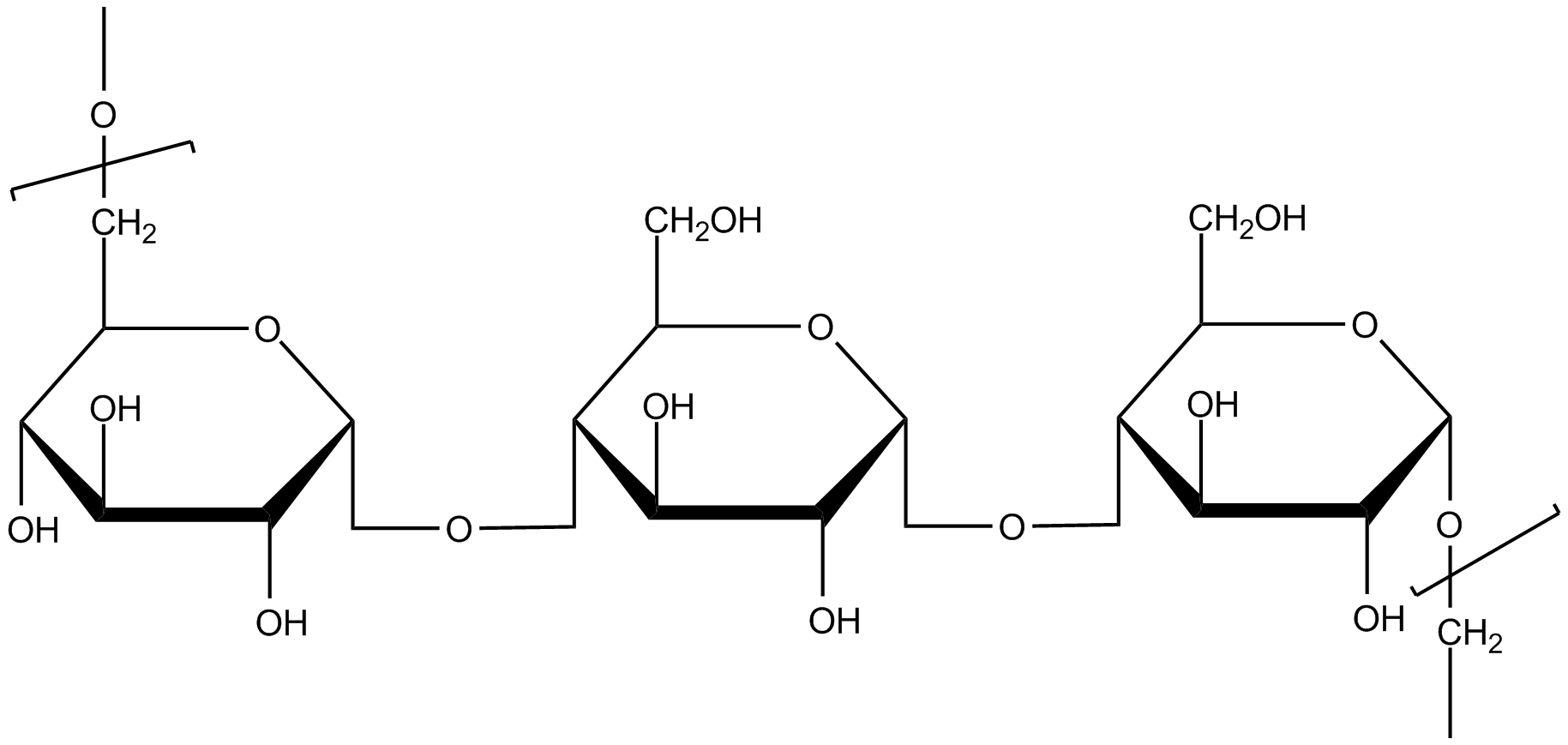

Names
- Other names E1204

Identifiers
CAS Number	9057-02-7
ChemSpider	none
ECHA InfoCard	100.029.938
EC Number	232-945-1
E number	E1204 (additional chemicals)
UNII	8ZQ0AYU1TT
CompTox Dashboard (EPA)	DTXSID301010857

Properties
Chemical formula	(C_{6}H_{10}O_{5})_{n}
Appearance	White powder
Solubility in water	Soluble
- Except where otherwise noted, data are given for materials in their standard state (at 25 °C [77 °F], 100 kPa). verify (what is ?) Infobox references

Pullulan is a polysaccharide consisting of maltotriose units, also known as α-1,4- ;α-1,6-glucan'. Three glucose units in maltotriose are connected by an α-1,4 glycosidic bond, whereas consecutive maltotriose units are connected to each other by an α-1,6 glycosidic bond. Pullulan is produced from starch by the fungus Aureobasidium pullulans. Pullulan is mainly used by the cell to resist desiccation and predation. The presence of this polysaccharide also facilitates diffusion of molecules both into and out of the cell.

As an edible, mostly tasteless polymer, the chief commercial use of pullulan is in the manufacture of edible films that are used in various breath freshener or oral hygiene products such as Listerine Cool Mint of Johnson and Johnson (USA) and Meltz Super Thin Mints of Avery Bio-Tech Private Ltd. (India). Pullulan and HPMC can also be used as a vegetarian substitute for drug capsules, rather than gelatine. As a food additive, it is known by the E number E1204.

Pullulan has also been explored as a natural polymeric biomaterial used to fabricate injectable scaffolding for bone tissue engineering, cartilage tissue engineering, and intervertebral disc regeneration.

== See also ==
- Pullulanase
- Desiccation
