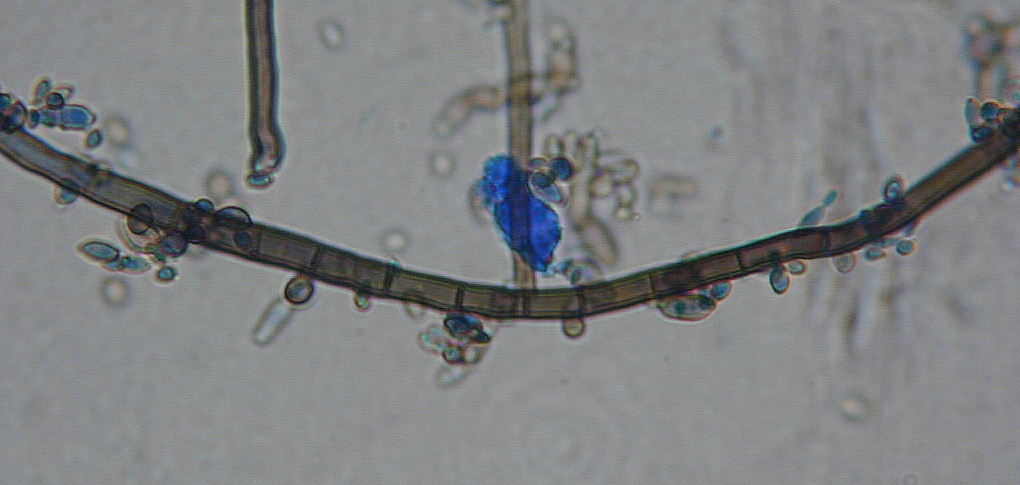
- Aureobasidium pullulans

Scientific classification
- Kingdom: Fungi
- Division: Ascomycota
- Class: Dothideomycetes
- Order: Dothideales
- Family: Dothioraceae; Theiss. & Syd. (1917)

= Dothioraceae =

Family of fungi

The Dothioraceae are a family of fungi in the order Dothideales. Species in this family have a widespread distribution, and are biotrophic or necrotrophic, usually associated with woody plants.

== Genera ==
- Aureobasidium
- Botryochora
- Delphinella
- Dothiora
- Endodothiora
- Jaffuela
- Pleosphaerulina Pass.
- Plowrightia
- Saccothecium
- Sydowia Bres. 1895 - 11 spp.
- Yoshinagaia
