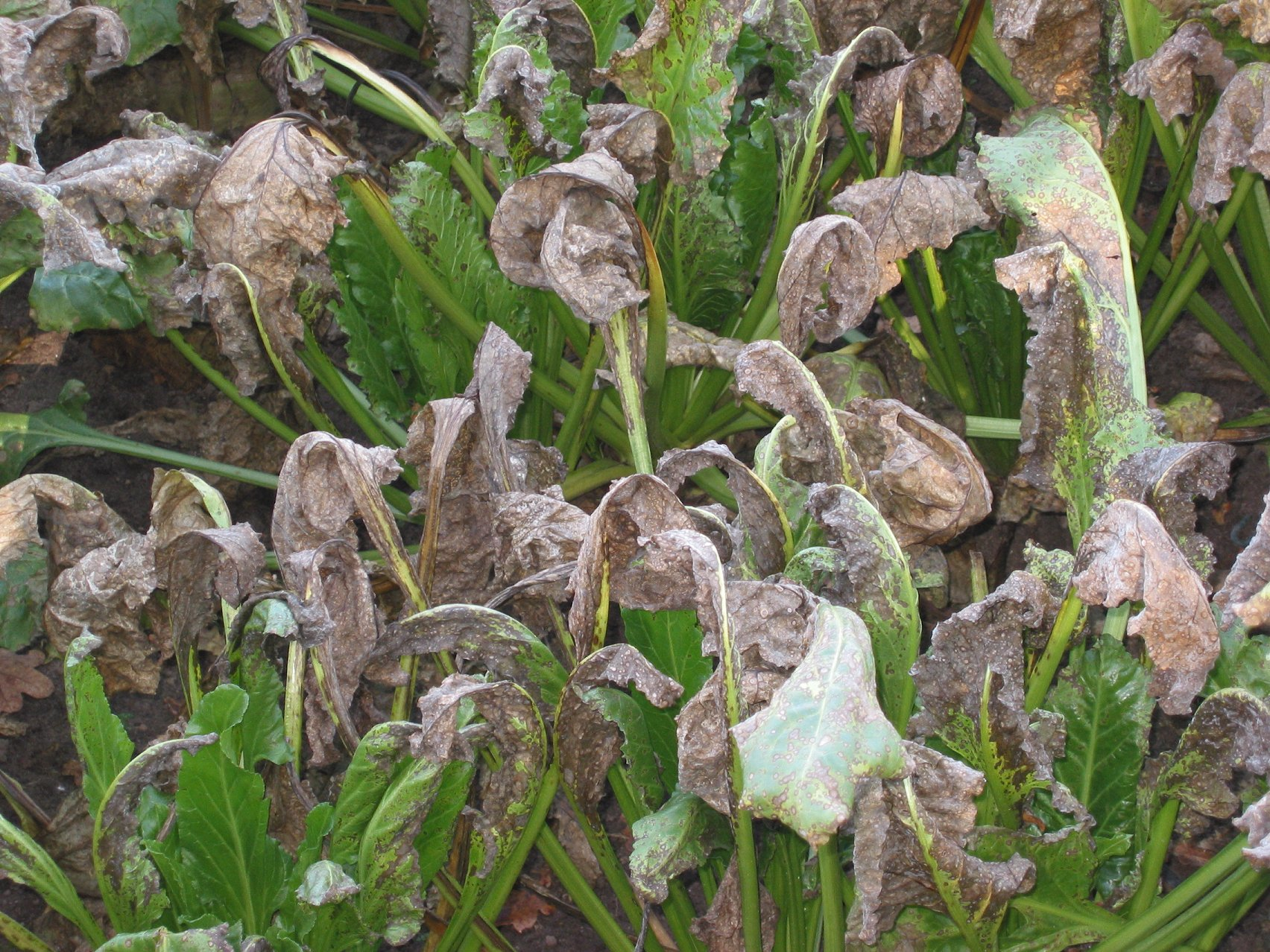
- Cercospora beticola damage

Scientific classification
- Kingdom: Fungi
- Division: Ascomycota
- Class: Dothideomycetes
- Subclass: Dothideomycetidae
- Order: Dothideales; Lindau (1897)

Families
- Dothideaceae (14); Neocelosporiaceae (3); Saccotheciaceae (8); Zalariaceae (1)

= Dothideales =

Order of fungi

Dothideales are an order of bitunicate fungi consisting mainly of saprobic or plant parasitic species.

== Description ==
Taxa in this order are characterized by the absence of a hamathecium (defined as hyphae or other tissues between asci) in a locule, and formation of ovoid to cylindrical fisstunicate asci (asci that have two wall layers that split at maturity in a Jack-in-the-box-like fashion), usually in bundles or cluster called fascicles. During development, the asci push through the stromatic tissue, creating the locules.

== Classification ==
Until 2001, this order was thought to contain five families: Botryosphaeriaceae, Coccoidiaceae, Doditheaceae, Dothioraceae, and the Planistromellaceae. Several molecular phylogenetic studies since that time have resulted in an organization restructuring of classification. In the December 31, 2007 revision of Ascomycota classification the Dothideales contains two families, the Dothidiaceae and the Dothioraceae. The Botryosphaeriaceae (order Botryosphaeriales) and the Planistromellaceae have been moved to order and family incertae sedis, respectively, pending the acquisition and analysis of additional molecular data.

In 2022, Dothioraceae was classed as a synonym of Dothidiaceae. Also families (with number of genera); Neocelosporiaceae (3), Saccotheciaceae (8) and Zalariaceae (1) were added to the order.
