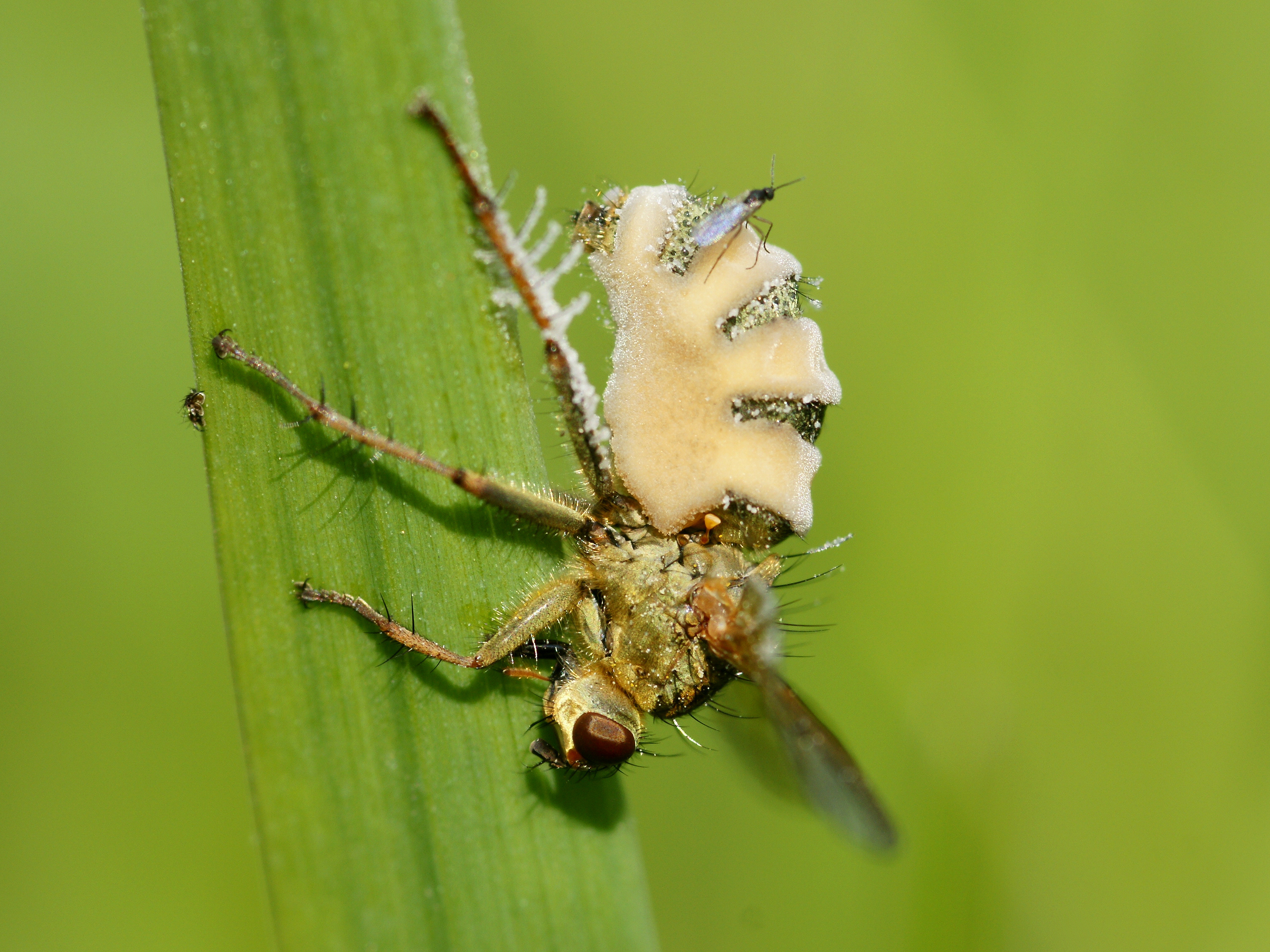
- Entomophthora muscae infesting the yellow dung fly Scathophaga stercoraria

Scientific classification
- Kingdom: Fungi
- Division: Entomophthoromycota
- Class: Entomophthoromycetes
- Order: Entomophthorales
- Family: Entomophthoraceae
- Genus: Entomophthora; Fresen. (1856)

Type species
- Entomophthora muscae (Cohn) Fresen. (1856)

Synonyms
- Empusa Cohn (1855); Myiophyton Lebert (1857); Lamia Nowak. (1884); Empusa subgen. Triplosporium Thaxt. (1888); Culicicola Nieuwl. (1916); Entomophthora Krenner (1961); Triplosporium (Thaxt.) A.Batko (1964)

= Entomophthora =

Genus of fungi

Entomophthora is a fungal genus in the family Entomophthoraceae. Species in this genus are parasitic on flies and other two-winged insects. The genus was circumscribed by German physician Johann Baptist Georg Wolfgang Fresenius (1808–1866) in 1856.

This fungus is parasitic and undergoes a number of stages within its life cycle, these include: infection, incubation, sporulation and mummification. Within each stage, this pathogen invades the host's body cells, utilising the insect's nutrients allowing it to take control over the brain just before the host's death.

Entomophthora reproduces asexually through both budding and spores. When in the host's body, the pathogen utilises budding as a form of growth. This is done through a fungus cell developing a bud (daughter cell) on the parent cell. The parent cell then replicates its DNA and provides the daughter cell with this DNA. The daughter cell is then able to detach itself from the parent cell resulting in multiplication of the fungus. Spores are another mechanism that is utilised as a method of reproduction; the spores act like seeds in that they will flourish when environmental conditions are appropriate and begin to grow hyphae – root like filaments. These hyphae then develop into the body of the fungus where the spores can be created once again and released into the environment to ensure further reproduction occurs again.

Similarly, spores are a method of transmission of this parasitic disease, when spores come in contact with the insect either through consumption or direct contact, the pathogen is able to infect the insect resulting in the beginning on the life cycle. The insect however has immune responses that fight against these parasites in order to defend themselves from infection.

== Physical characteristics ==
=== Description ===
Entomophthora is a type of fungal pathogen that is parasitic towards flies and other two-winged insects. When entered into a host's body, the fungal pathogen begins to invade the body cells and take control of the hosts, which in turn results in death. This relationship between a host and an organism is called parasitism. the parasite lives off or within another organism, in this case the fly (host) and causes harm or even death to the host. Entomophthora outbreaks commonly occur in temperate regions often during spring and autumn. Spores are the cause infection of a host, this usually occurs in cool and humid conditions commonly in areas where flies rest.

=== Life cycle ===
Infection occurs when an insect comes in contact with the Entomophthora pathogen. Once the insect has been infected, the fungal disease begins its transmission and development throughout the body, causing harm and soon death to the host. The stages this pathogen undergoes to impact the host and cause harm are referred to its life cycle.

The first stage of the life cycle is infection, referring to the invasion of micro-organisms into a genome. These micro-organisms are foreign to the body. Within this stage, the host come in contact with a conidia – a type of reproductive spore through touch or ingestion. When the conidia is within the host's body, it begins to germinate. Germination refers to the process in which an organism grows from a spore. Here, the conidia present within the body begins to produce hyphae, which act like the roots of the fungi as they grow and branch out within the body of the host, ultimately initiating the spread of the pathogen throughout the insect.

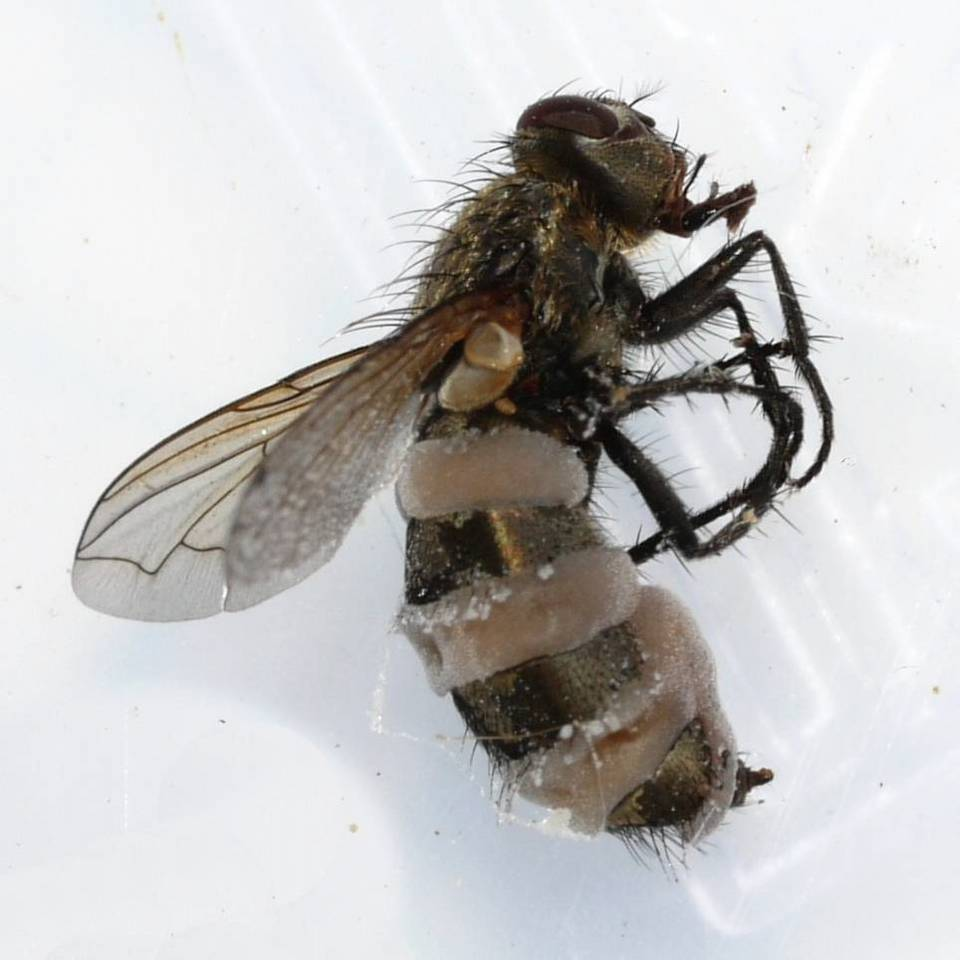
Death of a fly due to the invasion of Entomophthora

The next stage of the pathogen's life cycle is incubation; this is the period of time between the insect's first exposure to the pathogen and the occurrence of the first symptom. Within this period the internal hyphae combine digestive enzymes and utilise pressure to penetrate through a number of cuticle layers of the host. This allows for the spread of the pathogen throughout the whole body of the host, infecting the insects blood and tissue. The fungal cells are able to absorb water and nutrients from the host's body, ensuring the pathogen's survival.

This initiates the third stage of the life cycle: sporulation. Within this stage, the fungal pathogen begins to reproduce, this is done through the formation of spores from vegetative cells and budding. These spores are then released within the insect and infect the membrane areas within the host's abdominal cuticle. The disturbance of blood flow, tissue and abdominal cuticle causes the pathogen to enter its last stage of its life cycle. In the host, the appearance of this stage is apparent due to abdominal swelling creating a striped pattern that remains even after death.

The last stage of the Entomophthora life cycle is mummification of the cadaver, in which this stage causes death to the host. The pathogen has interrupted and overtaken the host's main vital mechanisms for survival, so the host's body is no longer able to function normally and defend itself against the pathogen or any other threats. The mycelium – a group of hyphae- is then able to grow within the brain, controlling the behavioural aspects of the fly. The infection of the fly's brain allows the pathogen to gain control over the fly's movements. The pathogen commonly forces the host to locate itself on a high point of a surface, straighten out its back legs and open its wings. This allows for the hyphae to maximise growth within the body of the host causing death. Once death has occurred, the pathogen then releases its spores out into the environment to allow for transmission and reproduction once again. The position in which the fly remains ensures that the release of spores is dispersed as widely as possible to ensure transmission to another insect.

== Reproduction ==
Fungi reproduce asexually through the release of diploid spores. Spores are micro-unicellular cells that are released and dispersed into the environment in a mass of numbers to increase the likelihood of further development and growth of the fungus. As spores are very small in size, they are easily moved via environmental conditions, that being wind, water, or even on an animal's fur. These spores will find favourable conditions and successfully flourish, develop and grow into the structure and body of the fungi.

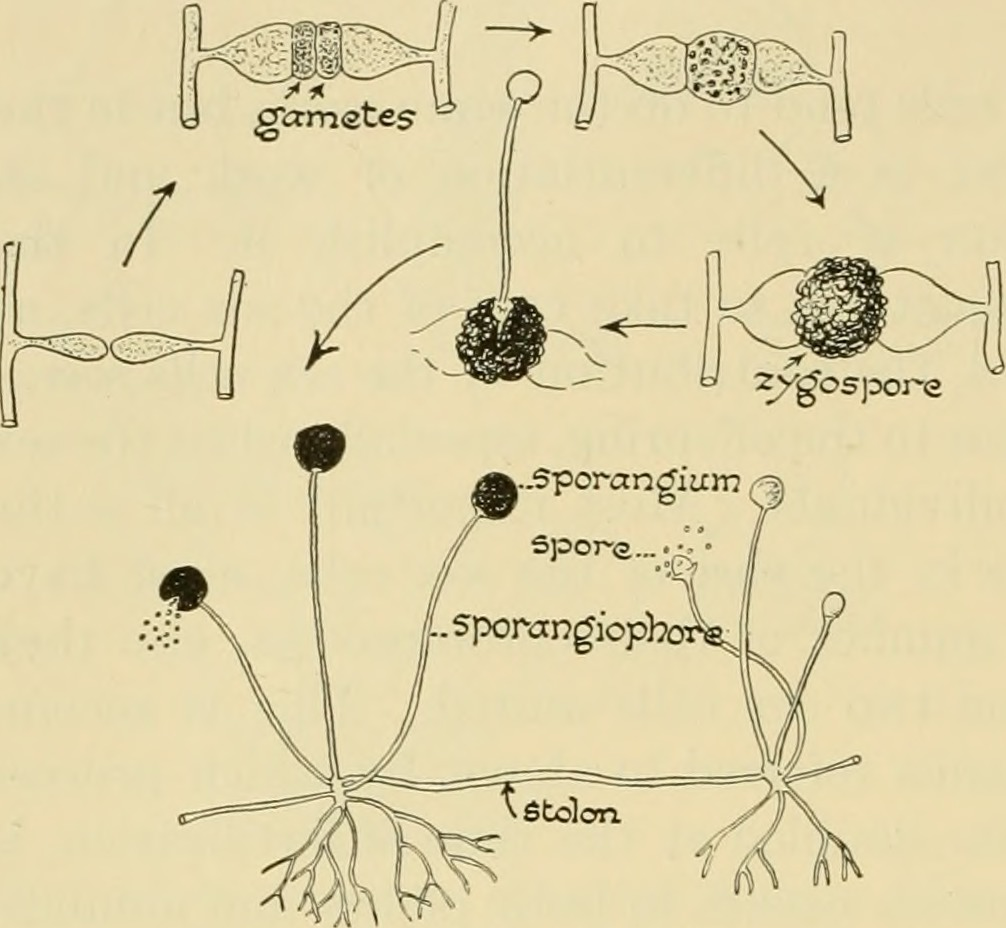
The process of Fungal Reproduction

Development of the fungus via spores is initiated through germination; this marks the beginning of fungal development. Spores will begin to develop filaments called hyphae; these are root like structures of the fungi as they branch out into the environment absorbing any available water and other nutrients required for survival. Groups of hyphae will interconnect, forming the main fungal body, the mycelium. The fungi will soon develop a sporangiophore, the stalk or stem of the fungus. The sporangiophore is an elongated structure that provides support to the body of the fungus and creates spores. This is done through a process in which the haploid nucleus – a nucleus with half the number of chromosomes for that species – is encased in an outer membrane with a cytoplasm. The haploid nucleus within the sporangiophore fuses with the cytoplasm to create diploid nuclei (spores) – a nucleus with the normal number of chromosomes for a specific species. These spores then travel through the sporangiophore where they reach the sporangium. The sporangium is the structure within the fungi that is reliant on storing spores. The rupturing of the sporangium releases a large mass of spores into the environment, this enable the fungi to reproduce rapidly.

Fungal species are also able to reproduce asexually via budding. Budding refers to the process in which an offspring is formed from a parent cell. This occurs for Entomophthora cells already within a host. When environmental conditions are favourable, a fungus cell develops a small growth on the cell body, this is referred to as the bud. The bud will enlarge over time, utilising the nutrients from the parent cell, which in turn ultimately causes growth. The parent cell replicates its DNA through the process of DNA replication – a process in which DNA undergoes a number of steps to formulate a copy of itself during cell division, creating genetically identical DNA to the parent cell. Once the DNA is replicated within the nucleus, the nucleus then divides. One copy of the nucleus moves into the bud, and the other nucleus remains in the parent cell. When the daughter cell (bud) reaches a certain size, it detaches from the parent cell via cytokinesis. Cytokinesis refers to a process in which the cytoplasm within a cell splits, separating two cells. During budding cytokinesis occurs to separate the daughter cell from the parent cell. Once the daughter cell is detached from the parent cell, it will grow and mature into a large cell and will be able to develop its own bud and hence reproduce.

== Transmission ==
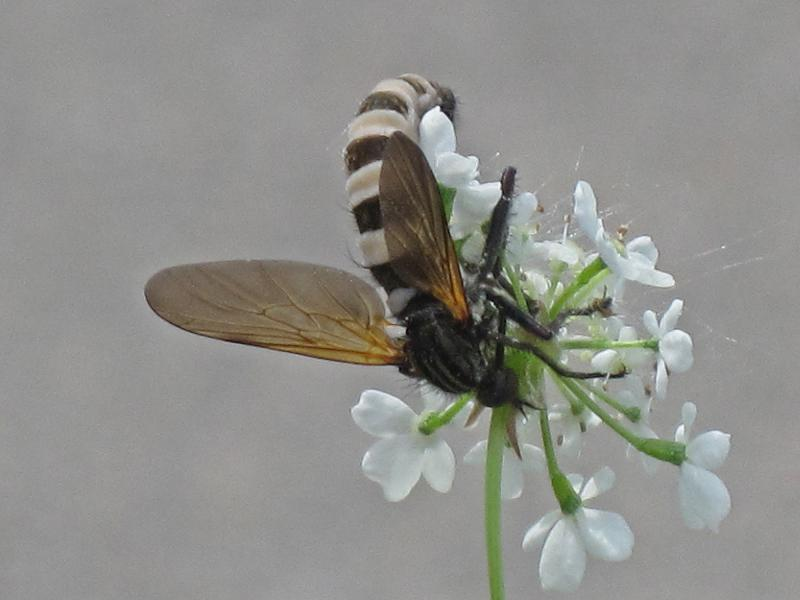

Entomophthora is a fungal pathogenic disease. In order for this species to infect other organisms the pathogen must come in contact with the insect's body. Fungal transmission occurs through the movement of microscopic reproductive spores through the environment. These spores are released out into the environment via the rupturing of a sporangium. Once the spores are released, their movement is dependent on environmental conditions, more specifically being blown through wind, passing through water streams, etc. Spores will continue to travel through the environment until they come in contact with an insect where the organism will become infected, and the pathogen's life cycle will begin. Contact occurs through the ingestion of spores or interaction between the pathogen and the external body of the insect. This is indirect transmission as the pathogen is airborne, travelling through the air until it comes in contact with an organism. Fungi can also be transmitted directly through contact between insects, ultimately transferring spores from an infected insect to a non-infected insect. Entomophthora has been looked into by humans as a form of biological control against flies that are pest insects; however, the transmission occurs through direct transmission between flies and attempts to artificially culture the fungus failed.

Once an insect is infected with the Entomophthora pathogen, it soon begins its life cycle. If successful the pathogen will invade the bodily cells of the host, germinate and reproduce within the host's body until the pathogen reaches the last stage of its life cycle. This stage is where the insect dies, the pathogen remains within the host's body producing and releasing spores into the environment. Further allowing the transmission of the pathogen to other organisms, to ultimately maximise infection of the Entomophthora disease throughout the two-winged insect population.

== Insect immunity ==
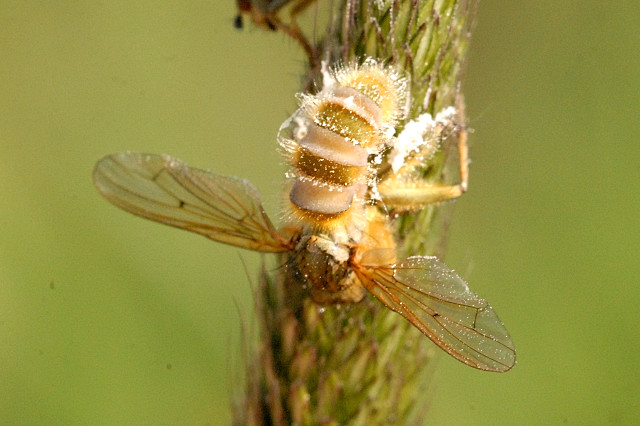

The immune system refers to the organs and tissues that are utilised within the body in order to provide resistance and protection against infection. While insects do not have an adaptive immune system like that found in mammals; they do exhibit limited adaptive immunity following previous exposure.

Immunity in insects is primarily dependent on innate immunity, which refers to genetically encoded immunity that does not require previous exposure. Innate immunity is commonly composed of humoral and cellular components. Humoral immunity refers to antimicrobial peptides and other molecules that confer immunity on insects. Cellular immunity is accomplished with phagocytic hemocytes.

Entomophthora is a parasitic disease, when entered into the body, the immune response is initiated when hemocyte receptors interact with foreign molecules. The recognition of a pathogen within the body triggers the immune response to occur within the area of the infected site. Hemocytes are cells within the immune system of invertebrates found within the hemolymph. These cells travel to the infected site when the immune response is triggered and begin to form a barrier like structure around the foreign parasite. Lamellocytes – effector cells – bind to the pathogen and create many cell layers until a capsule is formed around the fungus. Cytotoxic products are released into the capsule in order to kill the invading fungus. However, if the fungal pathogen is able to withstand this stress, it has the ability to continue its life cycle, causing death to the host.

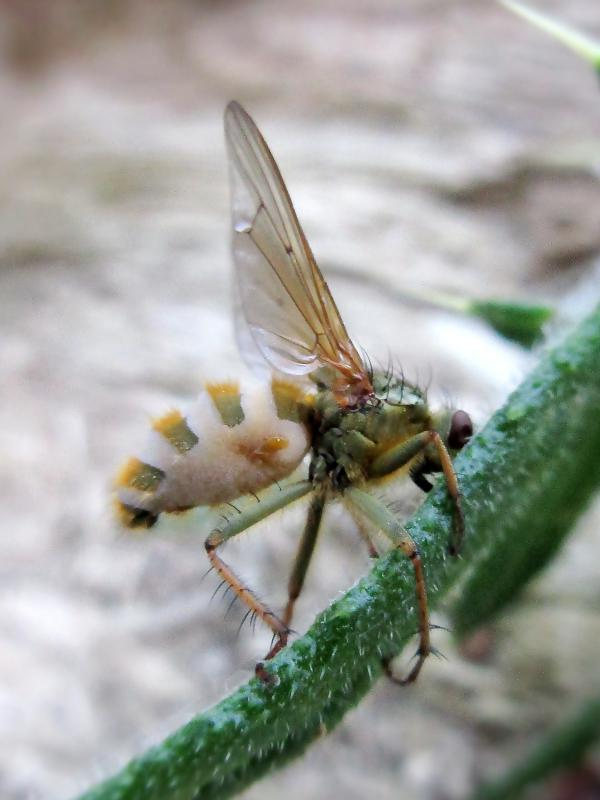
Entomophthora cf. muscae

== Taxonomy ==
The genus name of Entomophthora is derived from 2 words in the Greek, entomon meaning 'insect' and phthora which means 'destroyer'. The word entomon also means 'cut up into sections' which also describes the segments seen in insects.

== Species ==
As accepted by Species Fungorum:

- Entomophthora arrenoctona Giard (1888)
- Entomophthora bereshkovaeana (Lavrov & N.V. Smirnova) D.M. MacLeod & Müll.-Kög. (1970)
- Entomophthora blissi (G. Lakon) D.M. MacLeod & Müll.-Kög. (1973)
- Entomophthora brevinucleata S. Keller & Wilding (1985)
- Entomophthora bullata Thaxt. (1935)
- Entomophthora byfordii S. Keller (2004)
- Entomophthora calliphorae Giard (1879)
- Entomophthora chromaphidis O.F. Burger & Swain (1918)
- Entomophthora cimbicis Bubák (1906)
- Entomophthora cleoni (Wize) Bubák (1916)
- Entomophthora coleopterorum Petch (1932)
- Entomophthora colorata Sorokīn (1881)
- Entomophthora culicis (A. Braun) Fresen. (1858)
- Entomophthora destruens (J. Weiser & A. Batko) A. Batko (1966)
- Entomophthora dissolvens Vosseler (1902)
- Entomophthora egressa D.M. MacLeod & Tyrrell (1973)
- Entomophthora erupta (Dustan) I.M. Hall (1959)
- Entomophthora exitialis I.M. Hall & P.H. Dunn (1957)
- Entomophthora ferdinandii S. Keller (2004)
- Entomophthora grandis S. Keller (2002)
- Entomophthora helvetica S. Keller & Ben Ze'ev (1985)
- Entomophthora hylemyiae (G. Lakon) D.M. MacLeod & Müll.-Kög. (1970)
- Entomophthora inexpectata (Jacz. & P.A. Jacz.) D.M. MacLeod & Müll.-Kög. (1970)
- Entomophthora israelensis Ben Ze'ev & Zelig (1984)
- Entomophthora jassi (Cohn) G. Winter (1880)
- Entomophthora lauxaniae Bubák (1903)
- Entomophthora leyteensis Villac. & S. Keller ex S. Keller (2004)
- Entomophthora muscae (Cohn) Fresen. (1856)
- Entomophthora oehrensiana (Aruta, Carrillo & Monteal.) O. Martínez & E. Valenz. (2003)
- Entomophthora pelliculosa Sorokīn (1881)
- Entomophthora philippinensis Villac. & Wilding (1994)
- Entomophthora phryganeae Sorokīn (1881)
- Entomophthora planchoniana Cornu (1873)
- Entomophthora plusiae Giard (1889)
- Entomophthora pooreana A.L. Sm. (1900)
- Entomophthora pseudococci Speare (1912)
- Entomophthora punctata Garb. (1927)
- Entomophthora pustulata (J. Weiser) D.M. MacLeod & Müll.-Kög. (1970)
- Entomophthora pyralidarum Petch (1937)
- Entomophthora reticulata Petch (1939)
- Entomophthora richteri (Bres. & Staritz) Bubák (1906)
- Entomophthora rivularis S. Keller, Niell & Santam. ex S. Keller (2004)
- Entomophthora scatophaga Giard (1888)
- Entomophthora schizophorae S. Keller & Wilding (1988)
- Entomophthora schroeteri Brumpt (1940)
- Entomophthora simulii S. Keller (2004)
- Entomophthora sphaerosperma Fresen. (1856)
- Entomophthora staritzii (Bres.) Bubák (1916)
- Entomophthora syrphi Giard (1888)
- Entomophthora thripidum Samson, Ramakers & T. Oswald (1979)
- Entomophthora trinucleata S. Keller (1988)
- Entomophthora weberi G. Lakon ex Samson (1979)

== Former species ==
Almost are all family Entomophthoraceae, unless noted;

- E. acaricida (Petch) Krejzová (1976) = Apterivorax acaricida, Neozygitaceae
- E. adjarica Tsints. & Vartap. (1976) = Neozygites adjaricus, Neozygitaceae
- E. americana (Thaxt.) Sacc. & Traverso (1910) = Furia americana
- E. anglica Petch (1944) = Zoophthora anglica
- E. anisopliae Metschn. (1879) = Metarhizium anisopliae, Clavicipitaceae
- E. aphidis H. Hoffm. (1858) = Zoophthora aphidis
- E. aphrophorae Rostr. (1896) = Zoophthora aphrophorae
- E. apiculata (Thaxt.) M.A. Gust. (1965) = Batkoa apiculata
- E. aquatica J.F. Anderson & Ringo ex J.F. Anderson & Anagnost. (1980) = Erynia aquatica
- E. atrosperma Petch (1932) = Tarichium atrospermum
- E. aulicae (E. Reichardt) G. Winter (1876) = Entomophaga aulicae
- E. batkoi Bałazy (1978) = Entomophaga batkoi
- E. blunckii G. Lakon ex G. Zimm. (1978) = Pandora blunckii
- E. brahminae S.K. Bose & P.R. Mehta (1953) = Pandora brahminae
- E. calopteni Bessey (1883) = Entomophaga calopteni
- E. canadensis D.M. MacLeod, Tyrrell & R.S. Soper (1979) = Zoophthora canadensis
- E. caroliniana (Thaxt.) S. Keller (1979) = Eryniopsis caroliniana
- E. carpentieri Giard (1888) = Conidiobolus carpentieri, Ancylistaceae
- E. cicadina (Peck) Bubák (1916) = Massospora cicadina
- E. conglomerata Sorokīn (1877) = Entomophaga conglomerata
- E. conica Nowak. (1883) = Erynia conica
- E. coronata (Costantin) Kevorkian (1937) = Conidiobolus coronatus, Ancylistaceae
- E. creatonoti D.F. Yen (1962) = Furia creatonoti
- E. crustosa D.M. MacLeod & Tyrrell (1979) = Furia gastropachae
- E. curvispora Nowak. (1877) = Erynia curvispora
- E. cyrtoneurae Giard (1888) = Tarichium cyrtoneurae
- E. delphacis Hori (1906) = Pandora delphacis
- E. delpiniana Cavara (1899) = Erynia delpiniana
- E. dipterigena (Thaxt.) Sacc. & Traverso (1891) = Pandora dipterigena
- E. dysderci (Viégas) D.M. MacLeod & Müll.-Kög. (1973) = Batkoa dysderci
- E. echinospora (Thaxt.) Sacc. & Traverso (1891) = Pandora echinospora
- E. elateridiphaga Turian (1978) = Zoophthora elateridiphaga
- E. floridana J. Weiser & Muma (1966) = Neozygites floridanus, Neozygitaceae
- E. forficulae Giard (1889) = Zoophthora forficulae
- E. fresenii (Nowak.) M.A. Gust. (1965) = Neozygites fresenii Neozygitaceae
- E. geometralis (Thaxt.) Sacc. & Traverso (1891) = Zoophthora geometralis
- E. gigantea S. Keller (1979) = Batkoa gigantea
- E. gloeospora Vuill. (1886) = Pandora gloeospora
- E. gracilis (Thaxt.) Sacc. & Traverso (1891) = Erynia gracilis
- E. grylli Fresen. (1856) = Entomophaga grylli
- E. henrici Molliard (1918) = Erynia henrici
- E. ignobilis I.M. Hall & P.H. Dunn (1957) = Conidiobolus obscurus, Ancylistaceae
- E. jaapiana Bubák (1916) = Tarichium jaapianum
- E. jaczewskii (Zaprom.) D.M. MacLeod & Müll.-Kög. (1970) = Erynia jaczewskii
- E. kansana J.A. Hutchison (1962) = Entomophaga kansana
- E. lageniformis (Thaxt.) D.M. MacLeod & Müll.-Kög. (1973) = Neozygites lageniformis, Neozygitaceae
- E. lampyridarum (Thaxt.) Sacc. & Traverso (1891) = Eryniopsis lampyridarum
- E. lecanii (Zimm.) D.M. MacLeod & Müll.-Kög. (1973) = Neozygites lecanii, Neozygitaceae
- E. longispora Bałazy (1982) = Eryniopsis longispora
- E. major (Thaxt.) M.A. Gust. (1965) = Batkoa major
- E. megasperma (Cohn) Sacc. (1888) = Tarichium megaspermum
- E. montana (Thaxt.) Sacc. & Traverso (1891) = Furia montana
- E. muscivora J. Schröt. (1886) = Pandora muscivora
- E. nebriae Raunk. (1893) = Erynia nebriae
- E. neri M.A. Gust. (1969) = Neozygites fresenii, Neozygitaceae
- E. obscura I.M. Hall & P.H. Dunn (1957) = Conidiobolus obscurus, Ancylistaceae
- E. occidentalis (Thaxt.) Sacc. & Traverso (1891) = Zoophthora occidentalis
- E. ovispora Nowak. (1877) = Erynia ovispora
- E. papillata (Thaxt.) Sacc. & Traverso (1910) = Batkoa papillata
- E. parvispora D.M. MacLeod & K.P. Carl (1976) = Neozygites parvisporus, Neozygitaceae
- E. phalangicida Lagerh. (1898) = Pandora phalangicida
- E. phytonomi Arthur (1887) = Zoophthora phytonomi
- E. porteri R.S. Soper (1974) = Zoophthora porteri
- E. radicans (Bref.) Nowak. (1877) = Zoophthora radicans
- E. rhizospora (Thaxt.) Sacc. & Traverso (1888) = Erynia rhizospora
- E. rimosa Sorokīn ex J. Schröt. (1886) = Entomophthora schroeteri
- E. saccharina Giard (1888) = Entomophaga saccharina
- E. sepulchralis (Thaxt.) Sacc. & Traverso (1910) = Erynia sepulchralis
- E. tabanivora J.F. Anderson & Magnar. (1979) = Entomophaga tabanivora
- E. tenthredinis Fresen. (1858) = Entomophaga tenthredinis
- E. terrestris Gres & Koval (1982) = Pandora terrestris
- E. tetranychi (J. Weiser) D.M. MacLeod & Müll.-Kög. (1973) = Neozygites tetranychi', Neozygitaceae
- E. thaxteriana I.M. Hall & J. Bell (1963) = Conidiobolus obscurus, Ancylistaceae
- E. tipulae Fresen. (1858) = Entomophaga tipulae
- E. turbinata R.G. Kenneth (1977) = Neozygites turbinatus, Neozygitaceae
- E. variabilis (Thaxt.) Sacc. & Traverso (1891) = Erynia variabilis
- E. vermicola J.S. McCulloch (1977) = Neoconidiobolus vermicola, Ancylistaceae
- E. virescens (Thaxt.) Sacc. & Traverso (1910) = Furia virescens
- E. virulenta I.M. Hall & P.H. Dunn (1957) = Neoconidiobolus thromboides, Ancylistaceae
