= Neozygites slavi =

Scientific classification
- Kingdom: Fungi
- Division: Entomophthoromycota
- Class: Entomophthoromycetes
- Order: Entomophthorales
- Family: Neozygitaceae
- Genus: Neozygites
- Species: N. slavi

Binomial name
- Neozygites slavi Keller

Species of fungus

Neozygites slavi is a microscopic fungus in the order Entomophthorales, which affects aphids, particularly Slavum esfandiarii.
