= Batkoa major =

Scientific classification
- Kingdom: Fungi
- Division: Entomophthoromycota
- Class: Entomophthoromycetes
- Order: Entomophthorales
- Family: Entomophthoraceae
- Genus: Batkoa
- Species: B. major

Binomial name
- Batkoa major (Thaxt.) Humber, 1989

Species of fungus

Batkoa major is a naturally occurring fungus that infects insects.

Little is known about the pathogen. Found in the soil and belonging to the entomopathogenic fungi, the fungus spores attach to the insects' bodies upon contact. The fungus then enters the insect's body through weak spots in the outer cuticle or exoskeleton. The fungus then forms rhizoids to anchor its dying host to a tree, as spores start to develop on the insect's outer body and short-lived infective spores are ejected. The host insect dies between 4 – 7 days after being infected. Traces of the infective spores are hard to find in the environment.

The fungus has been studied as an environmentally-friendly insecticide to control pests such as the invasive spotted lanternfly (Lycorma delicatula) in north-eastern North America. Other known targets include the pine beauty moth and the potato leafhopper.

== See also ==
- Beauveria bassiana

== Bibliography ==
- Collection of Entomopathogenic Fungal Cultures : Catalog of Strains - (Humber, Richard A. United States. Agricultural Research Service)
