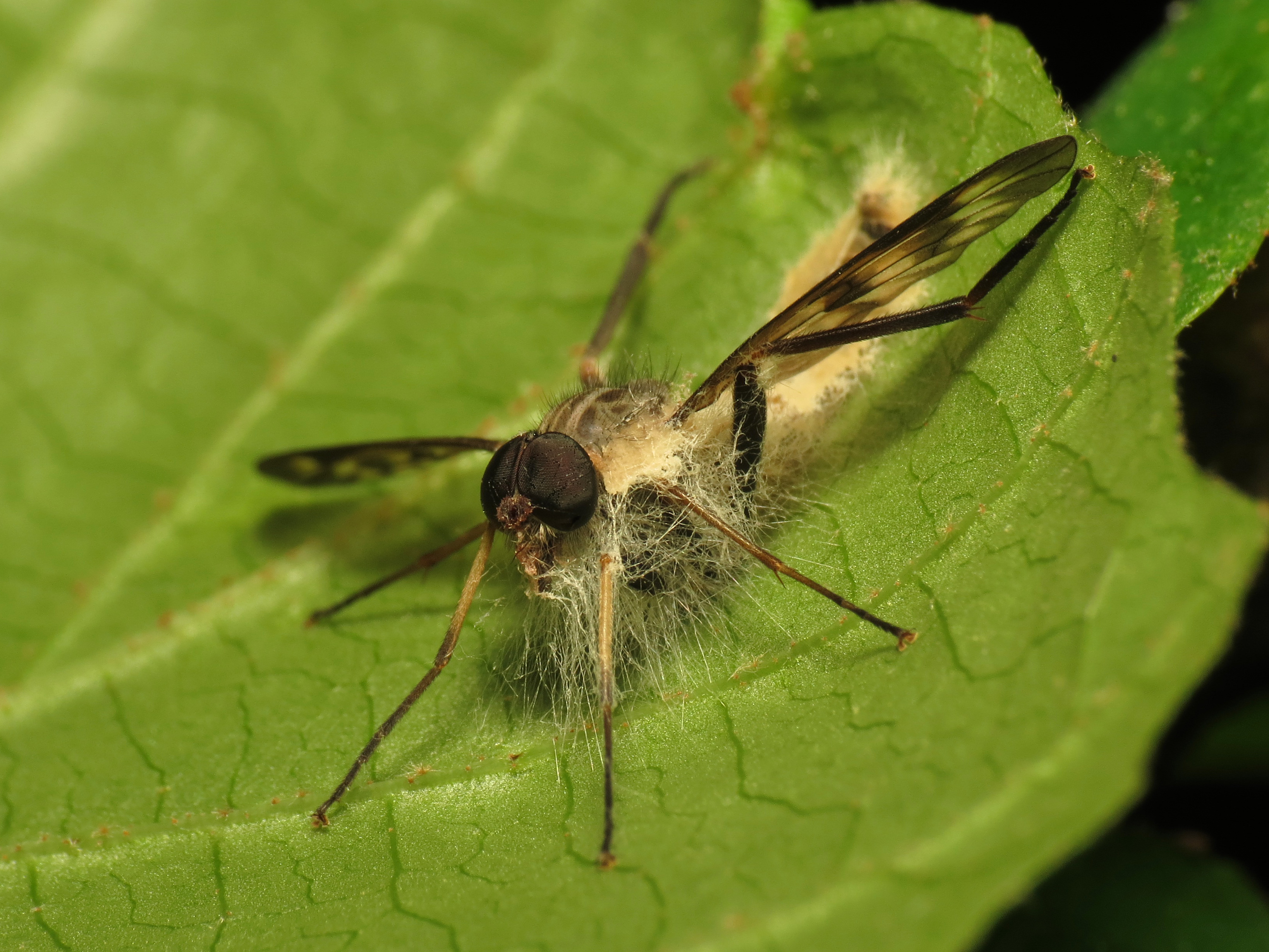
- Furia ithacensis on a Rhagio mystaceus male. Rock Creek Park, Washington, DC, USA.

Scientific classification
- Kingdom: Fungi
- Division: Entomophthoromycota
- Class: Entomophthoromycetes
- Order: Entomophthorales
- Family: Entomophthoraceae
- Genus: Furia; R. A. Humber, 1989

Synonyms
- Zoophthora subgen. Furia, A. Batko, 1966

= Furia (fungus) =

Genus of fungi

Furia is a genus of fungi within the family Entomophthoraceae. This has been supported by molecular phylogenetic analysis (Gryganskyi et al. 2012).

Furia was originally described in 1966 by Polish mycologist Andrzej Batko (1933–1997), as a subgenus of Zoophthora. The name Furia refers to the Roman and Greek goddesses of vengeance, reflecting the destructive impacts caused by these fungi on their insect hosts. American mycologist Richard A. Humber raised Furia to the generic level.

== Distribution ==
Furia species have been recorded mainly in the North America and Europe (especially in Great Britain) also Spain, with a few sparse discoveries worldwide, including in Mexico, and Brazil. In Poland and Austria, and a few other parts of Europe, the presence of the fungus Furia shandongensi W.M. Wang, W.H. Lu & Z.Z. Li (1994) has been found on earwigs.

== Species notes ==
Furia ithacensis is a species of the pathogenic fungus in U.S.A. that causes a fatal disease in snipe flies (Rhagio spp.). The infected snipe fly host typically dies on the underside of a leaf, most often during the evening hours. By morning, the fly will already have been dead for hours. Its fungus-ridden cadaver will be perched on the leaf with its wings spread as though ready to take flight. Its dead body is bound to the leaf by specialized hyphae with sucker-like holdfasts. The cadaver attracts new victims, especially searching males looking to mate. During the night, the fungus produces and forcibly discharges asexual spores, which can infect new snipe flies

The forest tent caterpillar (FTC), Malacosoma disstria Hubner (Lepidoptera: Lasiocampidae), is a cyclic defoliator (leaf eater) of North American forests, including Florida, and from Maryland and New York (state). Furia crustosa is now considered a synonym of Furia gastropachae. The fungus Furia gastropachae (Racib.) S. Keller has long been associated with FTC population decline. The species of fungus rarely infects species outside the genus Malacosoma. In 2002, resting spores were observed even within the cadavers infected by other resting spores, a phenomenon not previously observed among the Entomophthorales. This allows the fungus to initiate cycles of secondary infection via conidia'. Also, host infection by resting spores was highest at intermediate levels of soil moisture. Infection of fourth instar larvae by resting spores and conidia was maximized at cooler temperatures (of 10 to 20 °C).

Furia vomitoriae affects bluebottle flies (Diptera: Calliphoridae). It forms masses of conidiophores erupting through the intersegmental zones (or clear bands) on the abdominal dorsum of flies in Mexico.

Furia virescens (Thaxt.) Humber infects moth species of Agrotis, causing black, shrivelled larva and Furia montana infects adult two-winged flies of the species Dipters.

== Species ==
As accepted by Species Fungorum;

- Furia americana (Thaxt.) Humber (1989)
- Furia creatonoti (D.F. Yen ex Humber) Humber (1989)
- Furia ellisiana (Ben Ze'ev) Humber (1989)
- Furia fujiana Y.J. Huang & Z.Z. Li (1993)
- Furia fumimontana (Bałazy) S. Keller (2005)
- Furia gastropachae (Racib.) S. Keller (2005)
- Furia ithacensis (J.P. Kramer) Humber (1989)
- Furia montana (Thaxt.) Humber (1989)
- Furia neopyralidarum (Ben Ze'ev) Humber (1989)
- Furia pieris (Z.Z. Li & Humber) Humber (1989)
- Furia shandongensis W.M. Wang, W.H. Lu & Z.Z. Li (1994)
- Furia virescens (Thaxt.) Humber (1989)
- Furia vomitoriae (Rozsypal) Humber (1989)
- Furia zabri (Rozsypal ex Ben Ze'ev & R.G. Kenneth) Humber (1989)

Former species; (all family Entomophthoraceae)

- F. crustosa (D.M. MacLeod & Tyrrell) Humber (1989) = Furia gastropachae
- F. gloeospora (Vuill.) Z.Z. Li, B. Huang & M.Z. Fan (1997) = Pandora gloeospora
- F. triangularis (Villac. & Wilding) Z.Z. Li, M.Z. Fan & B. Huang (1998) = Erynia triangularis
