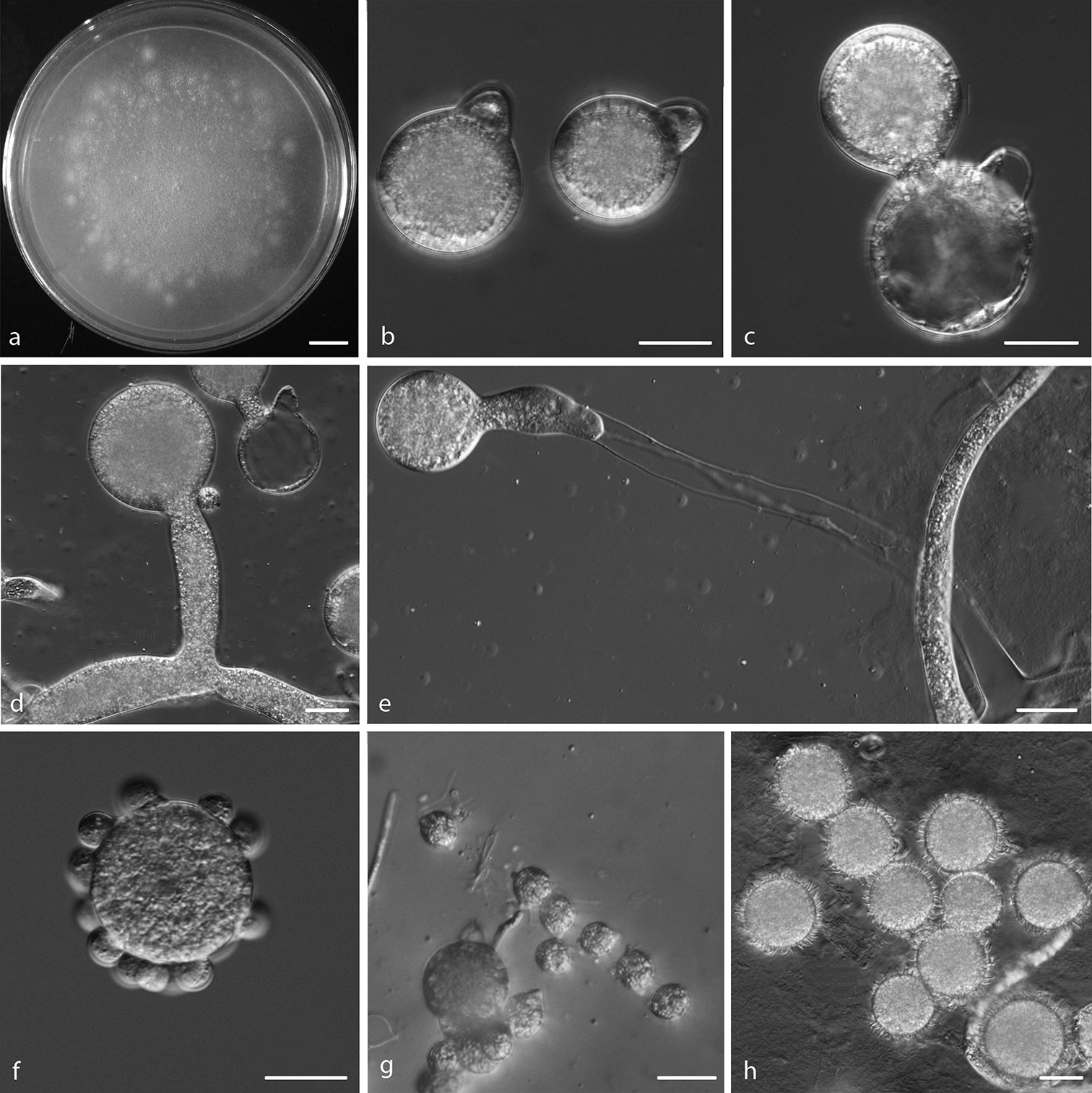

Scientific classification
- Kingdom: Fungi
- Division: Entomophthoromycota
- Class: Entomophthoromycetes
- Order: Entomophthorales
- Family: Ancylistaceae
- Genus: Conidiobolus
- Species: C. coronatus

Binomial name
- Conidiobolus coronatus (Costantin) Batko (1964)

Synonyms
- Boudierella coronata Costantin (1897); Delacroixia coronata Costantin (1899); Entomophthora coronata Costantin (1937); Conidiobolus villosus G.W. Martin (1925)

= Conidiobolus coronatus =

Species of fungus

Conidiobolus coronatus is a saprotrophic fungus, first described by Costantin in 1897 as Boudierella coronata. Though this fungus has also been known by the name Entomophthora coronata, the correct name is Conidiobolus coronatus. C. coronatus is able to infect humans and animals, and the first human infection with C. coronatus was reported in Jamaica in 1965.

== Taxonomy ==
Originally, C. coronatus was considered to be a part of the genus Boudierella, however it was later transferred to the genus Conidiobolus by Saccardo and Sydow. The fungus was also treated in the genus Entomophthora, and the name Entomophthora coronata remains a widely used synonym. Another synonym attributed to C. coronatus is Conidiobolus villosus by G.W. Martin in 1925 due to the characteristic presence of villi.

== Growth and morphology ==
Conidiobolus coronatus produces rapidly growing colonies that appear fuzzy and are flat. In their early stages, the colonies are both glabrous and adherent. In terms of colour, young C. coronatus colonies appear creamy gray, however as it ages, the colony adopts a tan to light brown colour. When grown on specific medium (Sabouraud-glucose agar with 0.2% yeast extract or potato dextrose agar (PDA) at 21 °C), C. coronatus colonies can reach approximately 4–5 cm in diameter within 3 days, demonstrating their rapid growth. When the fungus is grown at higher temperatures of about 37 °C, furrow and fold formation can be seen.

Conidiobolus coronatus reproduces asexually and produces thin-walled hyphae which occur singly or in clusters, with very few septa. At times, the hyphae will demonstrate an eosinophilic halo surrounding their edges; this halo has been termed the Splendore-Hoeppli phenomenon. C. coronatus hyphae can easily be visualized when hematoxylin and eosin staining is performed; however, they cannot be visualized via PAS or silver staining. The hyphae have unbranched sporangia, and some of these round sporangia exhibit short extensions named secondary spores. The single-celled round sporangia, as well as the secondary spores, are ejected from the short sporangiophores, and they can travel up to 30 mm upon ejection. If the medium the sporangia and spores land on is nutrient-dense, they will germinate and form one or more hyphal tubes, and the fungus will then continue its development and growth. Conidiobolus has three possible developmental pathways: (i) the fungus can remain in reproductive mode and form one or more secondary spores, (ii) the fungus may form a vegetative germ tube or (iii) it may not germinate at all. If the sporangia germinate through the development of a vegetative germ tube, the germ tube will then develop into a mycelium and go on to produce many sporangia and sporangiospores. If the fungus germinates through the formation of secondary spores, these secondary spores will usually be slightly smaller than the parent spores. The secondary spores may also go on to produce many smaller microspores. In young cultures, the C. coronatus spores have a smooth appearance; however, as they mature, the spores gradually become covered with short hair like projections called villi. The presence of villi is characteristic of C. coronatus. Growth of the fungus in vivo shows a histologic pattern similar to that seen in other Zygomycota infections.

== Physiology ==
Fungal growth is affected by the presence of optimal nutrients necessary for growth, by the presence of minerals, by temperature, by pH and by osmotic pressure. The presence of organic nutrients in the medium that C. coronatus finds itself in favors the formation of vegetative germ tubes, with glucose inducing vegetative germ growth far more effectively than asparagine. In terms of necessary nutrients for growth and survival, glucose and trehalose are both good sources of carbon for C. coronatus, other adequate sources of carbon are fructose, mannose, maltose, glycerol, oleate, stearate, palmitate and casamino acids, whereas galactose, starch and glycogen are all poor sources of carbon for C. coronatus. When looking at nitrogen, complex nitrogen sources seem to be best suited for optimal C. coronatus growth, however L-asparagine, ammonium salts, L-aspartic acid, glycine, L-alanine, L-serine, N-acetyl-D-glucosamine and urea can all adequately be used by the fungus as nitrogen sources to varying extents. This fungus is unable to utilize nitrate as a nitrogen source. Certain minerals are able to stimulate fungal growth; for C. coronatus these minerals are magnesium and zinc. In terms of temperature effects on fungal growth, the temperature at which C. coronatus growth is at an optimal stage on agar is 27 °C, and the minimum temperature at which it is able to grow on agar is 6 °C. Though there is no growth seen below 6 °C, good survival of C. coronatus has been demonstrated at temperatures of 1 °C. Finally, the maximum growth temperature of C. coronatus on agar is 33 °C, this maximum growth temperature increases to 40 °C when the fungus is grown in liquid culture. In terms of pH effects on C. coronatus, the optimal pH broad range of growth for this fungus is pH 5.5 to pH 7; however, sub-optimal growth can occur anywhere within the range of pH 3.5 to pH 8. In terms of pH dependent physiology, there is more frequent production of germ tubes on mildly acidic or neutral media (range of pH 5 to pH 7) with the greatest percent of germination occurring at pH 5. In addition, the percentage of spores that produce secondary spores is far greater on acidic media than on both neutral and basic media. In addition to organic nutrient and mineral presence, temperature and pH, osmotic pressure also has an effect on C. coronatus growth and dispersal. The spores of this fungus are more likely to germinate at lower osmotic pressures, and any medium with osmotic pressures greater than 10 atm will almost entirely inhibit germination of this fungus.

Conidiobolus coronatus produces forcibly discharged sporangia, which show phototropic orientation. Phototropic orientation aims growth and spore dispersal towards the most intense light source, thereby increasing the efficiency of dispersal. This orientation towards the most intense light source can also be seen as a survival mechanism for the fungus as it increases the possibility that the sporangia will be dispersed in the least obstructed direction and to the greatest distance. The forcible discharge is affected by the size of the spore, with smaller secondary spores being discharged to greater distances and therefore having a greater chance at becoming air borne and landing on a medium that is nutritionally favourable for fungal growth. The growing zone of C. coronatus shows a light-mediated reorganization, with a weakness and thinning of the cell wall being seen in the area of future growth. Both primary and secondary spores of C. coronatus show phototropic orientation, however it is imprecise and becomes increasingly imprecise the greater the lights' angle of incidence. Upon further observation of the imprecise phototropic orientation, it can be seen that the sporangia seem to aim their dispersal above the source of light, which may be a compensation mechanism to assure that the fungus has the ability to disperse at the greatest possible distance, while maintaining its dispersal orientation towards the light. Though the fungus shows phototropic orientation, albeit imprecise, the formation and discharge of secondary spores is shown to occur in darkness as well, however it seems to always requires high moisture levels.

Secondary dispersal through the formation of secondary spores is a survival mechanism exhibited by C. coronatus. This mechanism consists of the first spore producing a secondary spore if it lands on a nutritionally unfavourable medium, this secondary spore then gets discharged onto a different spot on the medium, or onto a completely different medium, in hopes of greater nutrient availability. These secondary, replicative spores are globose and elongate in physiology. Once the spore has been discharged, all subsequent developmental events are triggered, including germination. Sporangial germination, either through secondary spore formation or vegetative germ tube formation, seems to be increasingly dependent on the time elapsed since discharge, rather than on the external environmental factors, however these external factors do still play a role. The spores formed by C. coronatus during asexual reproduction are globose, villose and multiplicative in some isolates, and have at least seven nuclei per spore. This presence of villose and multiplicative spores is what differentiates C. coronatus from the genus Entomophthora. Though C.coronatus is classified under Zygomycota, it does not produce zygospores and therefore does not undergo sexual reproduction.

It has been demonstrated that C. coronatus produces lipolytic, chitinolytic and proteolytic enzymes, especially extracellular proteinases, namely serine proteases which are optimally active at pH 10 and 40 °C. Serine proteases are a diverse group of bacterial, fungal and animal enzymes whose common element is an active site composed of serine, histidine and aspartic acid. The serine proteases produced by C. coronatus are involved in the forcible discharge of sporangia and sporangiospores, in addition it has also been suggested that these proteases may have a function in the pathogenesis of human disease caused by C. coronatus. The serine proteases secreted by this fungus show great activity and thermostability, making them suitable for commercialization in the leather and detergent industries, as well for the recovery of silver from discarded photographic films. The genome of C. coronatus is 39.9 Mb in length with a total of 10,572 postulated protein-encoding genes.

== Habitat and ecology ==
Conidiobolus coronatus is an inhabitant of soil around the world, possessing a tropical and universal distribution. Due to its saprophytic nature,C. coronatus is mainly found on decaying and dead leaves.

== Disease ==
Conidiobolus coronatus is the causative fungal agent of chronic rhinofacial zygomycosis. Chronic rhinofacial zygomycosis is a painless swelling of the rhinofacial region that can cause severe facial disfigurement. Rhinofacial zygomycosis caused by C. coronatus has been reported in humans, horses, dolphins, chimpanzees and other animals. In addition to the rhino facial zygomycosis cases,C. coronatus is also pathogenic to mosquitoes Culex quinquefasciatus and Aedes taeniorhyncus, to the Guadaloupean parasol ant Acromyrmex octospinosus, to root maggots Phorbia brassicae, as well as to aphids and termites. The vast majority of human cases of rhino facial zygomycosis caused by C. coronatus have occurred in central and west Africa, with a few cases having been reported in Colombia, Brazil and the Caribbean. Veterinary cases have been reported throughout the United States and Australia as well as other parts of the world.

Focusing on human infection, C. coronatus mainly infects healthy adults, especially males. The pattern of a C. coronatus infection is similar to infections caused by other members of the Zygomycota. The rhinofacial zygomycosis pattern of infection can manifest when C. coronatus spores enter the nasal cavities through inhalation or through trauma of the nasal cavities. The infection starts in the nose and invades the subcutaneous tissue but rarely disseminates because the agent is not angio-invasive. Following invasion of the subcutaneous tissue, the characteristic rhinofacial masses develop. These masses are bumpy and uneven, and over time, they end up reducing the size of the individuals' nasal passages by pushing on the septum, causing symptoms such as nasal discharge, chronic sinusitis and complete obstruction of nasal passages. Chronic, long standing infection can lead to morbidity. A possible course of treatment is the surgical removal of the masses. Currently, there are no prevention strategies or specific risks identified for C. coronatus infection, and antifungal prophylaxis is not warranted. Reduction in disease prevalence and morbidity hinges on early detection and treatment. Recently demonstrated in HIV infected patient with first line ART resistance with delayed antifungal response.
