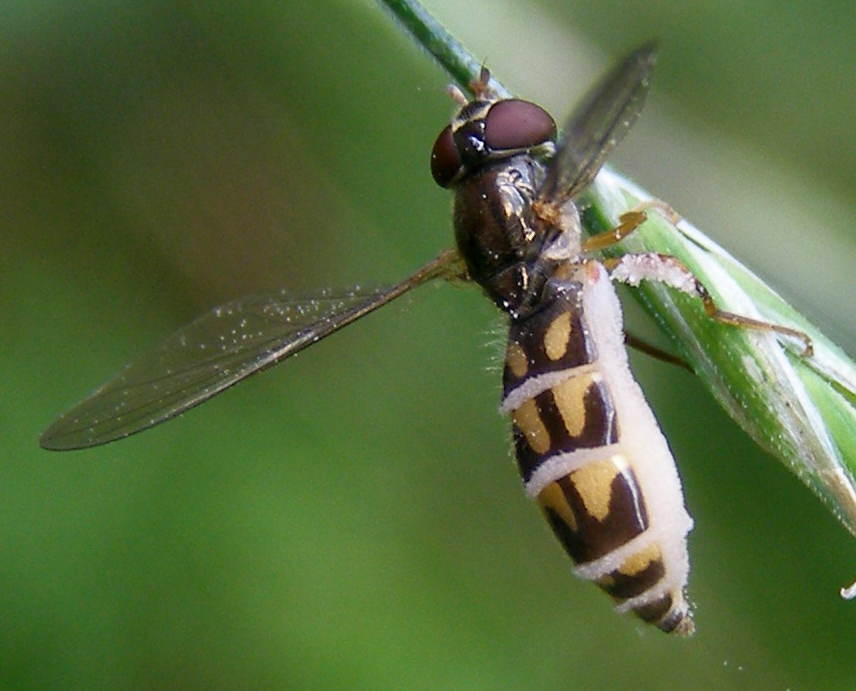
- A female Melanostoma scalare hoverfly infected with the fungus Entomophthora muscae

Scientific classification
- Kingdom: Fungi
- Division: Entomophthoromycota
- Class: Entomophthoromycetes
- Order: Entomophthorales
- Family: Entomophthoraceae; A.B.Frank (1874)

Type genus
- Entomophthora Fresen. (1856)

Subfamilies
- Erynioideae; Entomophthoroideae

= Entomophthoraceae =

Family of fungi

Entomophthoraceae is a family of fungi in the order Entomophthorales. This has been supported by molecular phylogenetic analysis (Gryganskyi et al. 2012). Most species in the family are obligately entomopathogenic. There are two subfamilies, Erynioideae and Entomophthoroideae, which were proposed in 2005.

== Genera ==
- Batkoa Humber (1989) – 10 spp.
- Entomophaga A.Batko (1964) – 22 spp.
- Entomophthora Fresen. (1856) – 63 spp.
- Erynia (Nowak. ex A.Batko) Remaud. & Hennebert (1980) – 27 spp.
- Eryniopsis Humber (1984) – 5 spp.
- Furia (A.Batko) Humber (1989) – 16 spp.
- Massospora Peck (1878) – 5 spp.
- Orthomyces Steinkr., Humber & J.B.Oliv. (1998) – 1 sp.
- Pandora Humber 2005 - 31 spp.
- Strongwellsea A.Batko & J.Weiser (1965) – 8 spp.
- Tarichium Cohn (1875) – 26 spp.
- Zoophthora A.Batko (1964) – 38 spp.
