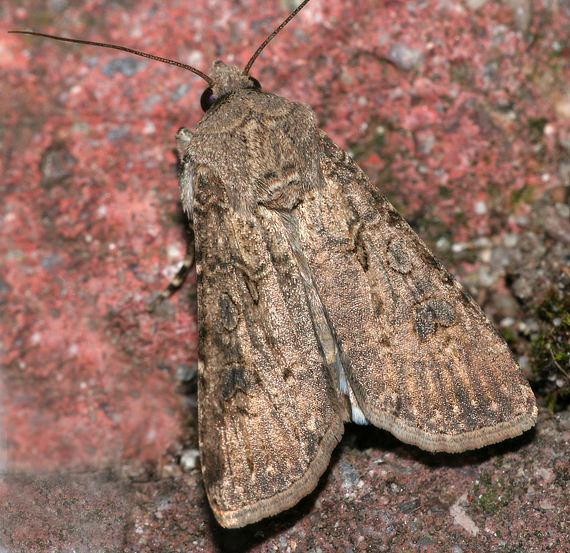
- Adult moth
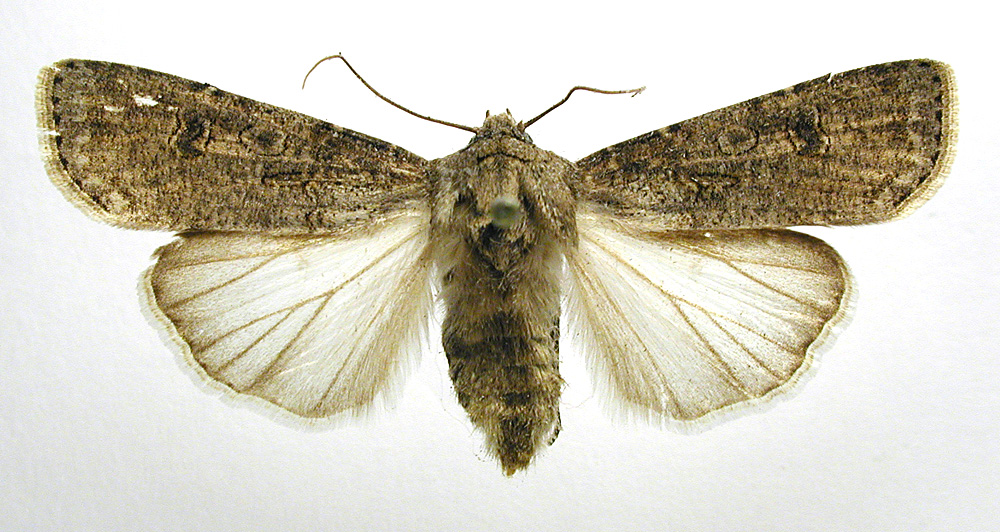
- Mounted

Scientific classification
- Kingdom: Animalia
- Phylum: Arthropoda
- Clade: Pancrustacea
- Class: Insecta
- Order: Lepidoptera
- Superfamily: Noctuoidea
- Family: Noctuidae
- Genus: Agrotis
- Species: A. segetum

Binomial name
- Agrotis segetum (Denis & Schiffermüller, 1775)

Synonyms
- Noctua segetum Denis & Schiffermüller 1775; Euxoa segetis

= Turnip moth =

Species of moth

Agrotis segetum, sometimes known as the turnip moth, is a moth of the family Noctuidae. The species was first described by Michael Denis and Ignaz Schiffermüller in 1775. It is a common European species and it is found in Africa and across Eurasia except for the northernmost parts.

It is a cutworm in the genus Agrotis, which possibly is the genus that includes the largest number of species of cutworms.

== Common names ==
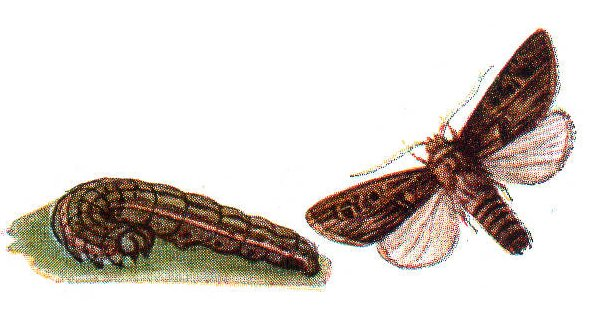
Illustration of caterpillar and imago

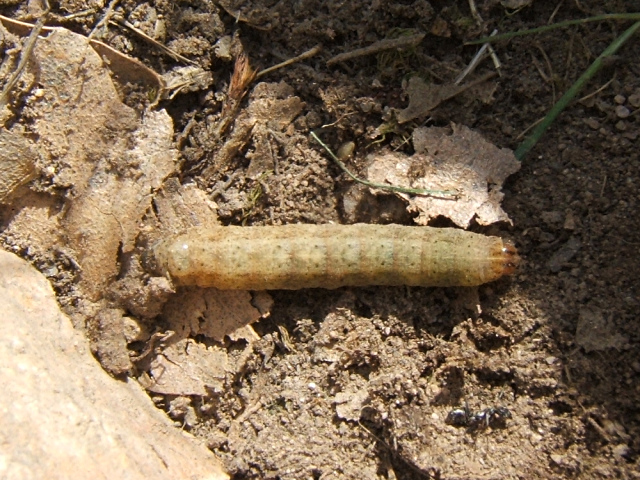
Larva

It is usually known as the common cutworm in English. It is sometimes called the turnip moth in the United Kingdom.

== Description ==
This is a very variable species with the fore-wings ranging from pale buff through to almost black. The paler forms have three dark-bordered stigmata on each fore-wing. Antennae of male bipectinated (comb like on both sides) with moderate length branches. The main feature distinguishing it from other Agrotis species is the shade of the hind-wings, pure white in the males and pearly grey in the females. The wingspan is 32–42 mm.

Edward Meyrick, an English schoolteacher who is especially notable for his study of the microlepidoptera, had this to say about the species:

Wingspan 33–41 mm. Antennae in male bipectinated. Fore-wings brownish, sometimes reddish tinged, with darker fuscous strigulae mixed with black scales, sometimes wholly darker suffused; sub-basal, first, and second lines edged with dark fuscous, second sometimes with dots only; spots outlined with black, orbicular and reniform centred with fuscous; subterminal line faint or whitish sprinkled, followed by darker suffusion. Hind-wings white, termen brownish. Larva pale grey or greyish ochreous, sometimes pinkish tinged; dorsal, subdorsal, and spiracular lines usually indicated by dark edges, subdorsal sometimes grey head pale, with two brown marks; plate of 2 more or less brown.

Agrotis segetum is difficult to certainly distinguish from its congeners. See Townsend et al.

- Agrotis clavis (Hufnagel, 1766)
- Agrotis exclamationis (Linnaeus, 1758

== Distribution ==
It is possible it has been spread by the international trade in nursery stock.

== Ecology ==
=== Behaviour ===
In the British Isles, two broods are produced each year, the adults flying in May and June and again in August and September. It is known to migrate some distances. The species is nocturnal and is attracted to light and nectar-rich flowers. The species overwinters as a caterpillar.

=== Larval behaviour and damage ===
Agrotis segetum is one of the most important species of noctuid moths whose larvae are called cutworms. The larvae are generally grey, sometimes tinged with purple. They attack the roots and lower stems of a huge range of plants (see list below) and can be a particularly serious pest of root vegetables and cereals. Attacking the lower stems often results in cutting down seedlings, which is why this species is classed as a cutworm.

=== Recorded host plants ===
The following is a partial list of genera and other taxa on which the larvae of the turnip moth have been recorded, whether feeding in situ, incidentally, in a laboratory or home breeding situation, or simply having been recorded (perhaps erroneously) in a field of crops. It is striking that the list includes such a sheer variety of plants including resinous, aromatic, and toxic species such as conifers, Eucalyptus, and Nicotiana:

- Acacia
- Allium
- Apium – celery
- Arachis – peanut
- Asparagus
- Beta – beet
- Brassica
- Camellia
- Casuarina
- Cedrus – deodar cedar
- Chrysanthemum
- Cichorium – chicory
- Coffea – coffee
- Cucurbita
- Eucalyptus
- Fragaria – strawberry
- Glycine – soybean
- Gossypium – cotton plant
- Hagenia
- Helianthus – sunflower
- Hibiscus – bissap
- Indigofera
- Lactuca
- Lycopersicon – tomato
- Malus – apple
- Medicago – alfalfa
- Nicotiana – tobacco
- Picea – Sitka spruce
- Pinus – pine
- Pisum – pea
- Pseudotsuga – Douglas-fir
- Rheum – rhubarb
- Rumex
- Saccharum – sugar cane
- Secale – rye
- Sesamum – sesame
- Solanum – potato
- Sorghum
- Spinacia – spinach
- Tectona – teak
- Trifolium – clover
- Triticum – wheat
- Vigna – urad bean
- Vitis – grape
- Zea – maize

=== Diseases ===
As with any other noctuid, assorted diseases, predators, and parasitoids attack Agrotis segetum, mainly in the egg and larval stages.

A fungus called Tarichium megaspermum (from the order Entomophthorales) has been found within the infested larvae of the turnip moth. The fungus had killed the insects and left a finely granular mass consisting of large amounts of thick-walled spores.

== Spread and control ==
The insect is not believed to be present in the United States, where the government has been making efforts to prevent its introduction on imported food crops.

Cultural methods such as fallowing land before sowing, to starve the larvae can be effective, and in suitable conditions, ploughing land during the dry season to kill larvae and pupae, and expose them to predators, has been effective in maize fields in South Africa.

Insecticides of various kinds have been used with success for many decades. Baits based on sweetened bran, finely spread, have met with some success.

A Betabaculovirus virus species, "Agrotis segetum granulovirus DA", was first isolated in the USSR in the late 1960s, but despite some research in the 1970s, as of 2017 it has not been found to be commercially viable as a biocontrol for crops.
