= Tarichium =

Scientific classification
- Domain: Eukaryota
- Kingdom: Fungi
- Division: Entomophthoromycota
- Class: Entomophthoromycetes
- Order: Entomophthorales
- Genus: Tarichium; Cohn, 1870

Type species
- Tarichium megaspermum Cohn, 1870

Genus of fungi

Tarichium is a genus of fungi within the order Entomophthorales of the Zygomycota. This has been supported by molecular phylogenetic analysis (Gryganskyi et al. 2012).

== History ==
The fungus Tarichium was originally described in 1870 by German botanist Ferdinand Julius Cohn (1828-1898), when he discovered the fungus Tarichium megaspermum within the infested larvae of the turnip moth (Agrotis segetum Denis & Schiffermuller). The fungus turns the hosts skin turns black, coal-black pigment is found in the blood, later the caterpillar or larvae becomes wrinkled and brittle-like a mummy. Later after the fungus had killed the insect-host. Inside the host-body, the fungus left a finely granular mass consisting of large amounts of thick-walled spores, which were large and globular dark brown spores that have a wrinkled surface.

The genus was published in 1870 and the name Tarichium was derived from the Latin taricheia which means 'mummification' or 'embalming' combined with the Latin diminutive suffix 'ium' to describe the infected larvae, which end up becoming mummy-like. The genus was then used for members of the Entomophthorales known only (at the time of their collection and description) from their thick-walled resting spores. It was first thought in 1871, that the fungus was a conidial stage of Entomophthora muscae (a fungal parasite that attacks houseflies).

It was later thought that the fungus could be used as a control method on insects attacking crops.

Botanist I. Krassilstschik in Russia in 1886, also discovered the fungus within the larval body of the coleopterous sugar-beet curculio Cleonus punctiventris. He labelled it Tarichium uvella. Although it was later in 1889 by French zoologist Giard revealed it to be a synonym of Soroporella uvella.

There were 32 alleged species (in 1970), assigned mainly on the basis of resting spore morphology. Many of these are not well known because their descriptions have appeared in publications which are difficult to obtain. Also none of the species have been cultured on artificial medium to study fully.

The fungus Tarichium megaspermum had not been re-identified conclusively in the literature since its original description by Cohn in 1870. It was a major cause of disease of the red-backed cutworm in British Columbia, Canada, in 1957 and 1959 and a minor cause of disease of the dark-sided cutworm (Euxoa ochrogaster) in Ontario, Canada, in 1971. Populations of both host species were also infected with the conidial state of a fungus identified as Entomophthora virescens. It is possible that T. megaspermum and E. virescens represent the resting spore and conidial states, respectively, of a single fungus species, Entomophthora megasperma.

In 2012, the genus Tarichium was known for species known only from resting spores apparently represents a mix of species attributable to Neozygitaceae (especially species pathogenic tomites) and Entomophthoraceae. It was suggested that DNA-based studies and morphological re-evaluations should be carried out to confirm if species could be recognized as synonyms of other species or transferred to other genera within the Entomophthoraceae and Neozygitaceae families.

== Species ==
As accepted by Species Fungorum;

- Tarichium acaricola Bałazy & J. Wiśn. (1986)
- Tarichium atrospermum (Petch) Bałazy (1993)
- Tarichium azygosporicum Bałazy, J. Wiśn. & S. Kaczm. (1987)
- Tarichium cyrtoneurae (Giard) Bałazy (1993)
- Tarichium distinctum Bałazy, J. Wiśn. & S. Kaczm. (1987)
- Tarichium fumosonigrum Bałazy & J. Wiśn. (1986)
- Tarichium hyalinum Bałazy, J. Wiśn. & S. Kaczm. (1987)
- Tarichium hylobii S. Keller, J. Weiser & Wegenst. (2009)
- Tarichium jaapianum (Bubák) Bałazy (1993)
- Tarichium megaspermum Cohn (1875)
- Tarichium monokaryoticum Bałazy, J. Wiśn. & S. Kaczm. (1987)
- Tarichium obtusoangulatum Bałazy & J. Wiśn. (1986)
- Tarichium oplitidis Bałazy & J. Wiśn. (1993)
- Tarichium phytonomi Jacz. (1928)
- Tarichium pusillum Bałazy & J. Wiśn. (1986)
- Tarichium silesianum Bałazy & J. Wiśn. (1993)
- Tarichium sloviniense Bałazy & J. Wiśn. (1993)
- Tarichium sphaericum Bałazy & J. Wiśn. (1986)
- Tarichium subglobosum Bałazy & J. Wiśn. (1986)
- Tarichium subpunctulatum Bałazy (1982)
- Tarichium syrphis Z.Z. Li, B. Huang & M.Z. Fan (1997)
- Tarichium tatricum Bałazy & J. Wiśn. (1986)
- Tarichium tenuiparietatum Bałazy & J. Wiśn. (1986)
- Tarichium tenuisculpturatum Bałazy & J. Wiśn. (1986)
- Tarichium uropodinae Bałazy & J. Wiśn. (1983)
- Tarichium verruculosum Bałazy, J. Wiśn. & S. Kaczm. (1987)

Former species; (all are Entomophthoraceae family unless noted)

- T. auxiliaris J.G. Kühn (1877) = Catenaria auxiliaris, Catenariaceae
- T. bereshkovaeanum Lavrov & N.V. Smirnova (1949) = Entomophthora bereshkovaeana
- T. calliphorae (Giard) Bałazy (1993) = Entomophthora calliphorae
- T. coleopterorum (Petch) Bałazy (1993) = Entomophthora coleopterorum
- T. hylemyiae G. Lakon (1935) = Entomophthora hylemyiae
- T. inexpectatum Jacz. & P.A. Jacz. (1931) = Entomophthora inexpectata
- T. jaczewskii Zaprom. (1928) = Erynia jaczewskii
- T. porteri (R.S. Soper) Bałazy (1993) = Zoophthora porteri
- T. pustulatum J. Weiser (1965) = Entomophthora pustulata
- T. rhagonycharum Bałazy (1982) = Zoophthora rhagonycharum
- T. uvella Krass. (1886) = Sorosporella uvella, Hypocreales
