= Meristacrum =

Scientific classification
- Kingdom: Fungi
- Division: Entomophthoromycota
- Class: Entomophthoromycetes
- Order: Entomophthorales
- Family: Meristacraceae; Humber
- Genus: Meristacrum; Drechsler 1940 emend. Tucker & Humber 1981

Type species
- Meristacrum asterospermum Drechsler

Synonyms
- Pseudocoelomomyces E.A. Nam & Dubitskiĭ, 1977 (inedit.); Tabanomyces Couch, R.V. Andrejeva, Laird & Nolan, 1979

Single-species genus of fungi

Meristacrum is a fungal genus in the monotypic family Meristacraceae, of the order Entomophthorales. They are parasites of soil invertebrates, they typically infect nematodes, and tardigrades.

Fungi strains such as Meristacrum asterospermum and Zygnemomyces echinulatus have been identified as potential sources of biological control against parasitic nematodes. Although, they have yet to be raised within laboratory or Axenic conditions.

== History ==
The family Meristacraceae was specifically erected to hold the genus Meristacrum in 1940.

The genus Meristacrum gets its name from the Greek word meristos which means 'divided'.

Three genera that were formerly included in Ancylistaceae family; Ballocephala, Meristacrum, and Zygnemomyces, were transferred to Meristacraceae by American mycologist Richard A. Humber in 1989, because these fungi all produce a simple, upright conidiophore bearing several conidia.

Genera Ballocephala and Zygnemomyces were later then transferred to subdivision Kickxellomycotina, based on the bifurcate, plugged septa in their vegetative hyphae, this was also confirmed by Humber (in 2012).

== Life cycle ==
In general, the various fungal species of Meristacraceae, find a host using a germ hyphae produced by adhesive spores that were actively (ballistically) discharged and airborne. They use conidial propulsion, or by 'papillar eversion', which is by fluid discharge by a swollen subtending cell, or passively released from a short pedicel. Conidia then adhere to the integument (skin) of a live nematode, then either penetrate directly by a germ tube or germinate externally and produce secondary conidia. Resting spores germinate and produce a single erect conidiophore similar to those produced by thallodic segments The fungus then invades the abdomen of the host and a systemic infection develops. Once the host has died, sporophores are produced, typically between the individual segments of the abdomen, where a new generation of actively discharged spores are produced. Resting spores are often formed within the host, and the primary conidia also have the ability to produce typically smaller secondary conidia.

== Description ==
They have vegetative growth which is mycelial at first, then forming hyphal bodies. These are usually spherical to rounded. The Sporophores (conidiophores) are simple, unbranched, solitary cylindrical or slightly clavate, bearing terminal conidiogenous cells. The spores (conidia) are terminal, spherical, single celled, unitunicate (single walled), and forcibly by papillar eversion or passively discharged. The secondary spores are present or absent, either similar to primary spores and are also forcibly discharged or passively discharged from strongly narrowed and elongate sporophores. The nucleus is small, (about 3-5 μm (micron, or micrometre)) not clearly visible during mitosis and interphase, the nucleolus is prominent, and central. The resting spores (zygospores) are formed by hyphal conjugation (conjugation of neighbouring hyphal cells or scalariform conjugations between adjacent hyphae), the zygosporangium (episore) is hyaline (glass-like or transparent) or slightly pigmented and smooth or ornamented. The zygospore (endospore) is ovoid and smooth or globose to sub-globose and roughened, germinating directly to produce secondary spores or a sporophore.

== Species ==
As accepted by Species Fungorum;

- Meristacrum asterospermum Drechsler (1940)
- Meristacrum milkoi (Dudka & Koval) Humber (1981) (syn. Tabanomyces milkoi (Dudka & Koval) Couch, R.V. Andrejeva, Laird & Nolan (1979))

Former species; M. pendulatum J.S. McCulloch (1977) is now Zygnemomyces pendulatus, Mucoromycota
