= Eryniopsis =

Scientific classification
- Kingdom: Fungi
- Division: Entomophthoromycota
- Class: Entomophthoromycetes
- Order: Entomophthorales
- Family: Entomophthoraceae
- Genus: Eryniopsis; Humber, 1984

Type species
- Eryniopsis lampyridarum (Thaxt.) Humber (1984)

Genus of fungi

Eryniopsis is a genus of fungi within the family of Entomophthoraceae and order Entomophthorales. This has been supported by molecular phylogenetic analysis (Gryganskyi et al. 2012).

The genus was circumscribed by American mycologist Richard A. Humber in 1984, and the name of Eryniopsis was derived from its similarity to members of the fungal genus Erynia, and also combined with the Greek word opsis which means "aspect" or "appearance".

The genus of Eryniopsis was initially created in 1984, based on Eryniopsis lampyridarum, for species with primary conidia that are multi-nucleate (ca 4–12 nu-clei), unitunicate (having one wall in the ascus) and elongate (rather than globose (rounded) or pyriform (pear-shaped)). They are produced on simple to dichotomously branched conidiophores, and actively ejected (Humber 1984). This genus originally contained three species; Eryniopsis lampyridarum, Eryniopsis longispora and Eryniopsis caroliniana. In 1993, two more species that produce elongate secondary conidia were added to Eryniopsis (Keller & Eilenberg 1993). Eryniopsis transitans was known only from Limoniidae (formerly a subfamily of crane flies, Tipulidae) found in Switzerland and also Eryniopsis ptychopterae which was known only from Ptychopteridae (phantom crane flies, closely related to Tipulidae) and found in Denmark. They both had pear-shaped primary conidia that resemble members of the genus Entomophaga. (They were later transferred to that genus).

The species of Eryniopsis vary in the shapes of primary conidia.

== Distribution ==
It has a cosmopolitan distribution, scattered worldwide. With most sightings in America and Europe. Including Switzerland, and Spain.

== Hosts ==
Species Eryniopsis lampyridarum is known to infect (and kills later) the soldier beetle, either species Chauliognathus marginatus or goldenrod soldier beetle species, Chauliognathus pensylvanicus.

Species Eryniopsis caroliniana has been found on (Diptera order) Tipulidae hosts in North America, central and western Europe.

Species Eryniopsis longispora has been found on (Diptera order) small Nematocera hosts in Poland.

== Species ==
As accepted by Species Fungorum;

- Eryniopsis caroliniana (Thaxt.) Humber (1984)
- Eryniopsis lampyridarum (Thaxt.) Humber (1984)
- Eryniopsis longispora (Bałazy) Humber (1984)
- Eryniopsis rhagionidarum S. Keller (2007)

Former species; (all family Entomophthoraceae)

- E. ptychopterae S. Keller & Eilenberg (1994) = Entomophaga ptychopterae
- E. transitans S. Keller (1994) = Entomophaga transitans
