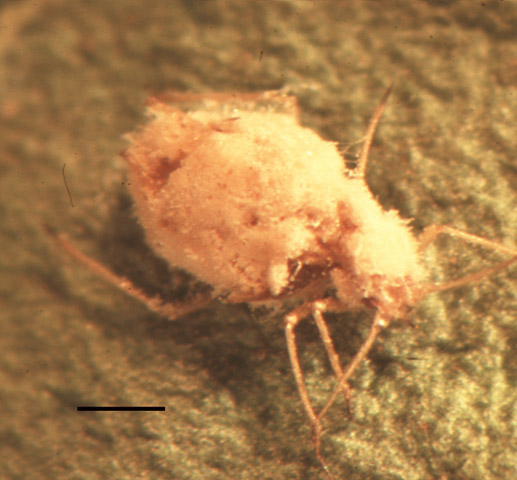
- Myzus persicae killed by Pandora neoaphidis

Scientific classification
- Kingdom: Fungi
- Division: Entomophthoromycota
- Class: Entomophthoromycetes
- Order: Entomophthorales
- Family: Entomophthoraceae
- Genus: Pandora; R. A. Humber, 1984

Synonyms
- Erynia (Neopandora) Ben-Ze’ev & Kenneth 1982

= Pandora (fungus) =

Genus of fungi

Pandora is a genus of fungi within the order Entomophthorales. This has been supported by molecular phylogenetic analysis (Gryganskyi et al. 2012).

It was initially formed by Polish mycologist Andrzej Batko (1933-1997), as a subgenus of Zoophthora. Then American mycologist Richard A. Humber raised it to the genus level. The genus name of Pandora is derived from the Latin word pando which means “to become curved” or “to sag” and the generic suffix “ra” thus describing conidia, which are often with weakly outlined bilateral symmetry. They are on one side (abdominal) slightly flattened and on the opposite (dorsal) side, more convex, on the third (lateral) side, they are somewhat curved towards the abdominal side and slightly asymmetrical.

It has a cosmopolitan distribution.

It is best known by its representative Pandora neoaphidis, which acts as an obligate pathogen in various species of aphids. It is a widespread species that is often found to be the most common fungal insect pathogen on the local aphid community (e.g. in surveys from Argentina, Slovakia, and China.). It has therefore been the subject of study for biological control. This includes usage on the green peach aphid, Myzus persicae (Homoptera: Aphididae), which predates on spinach (Spinacea oleracea L.) in Arkansas, America. Up to 95 species of the aphid (world-wide) have been found to be infected by the fungus. From places such as France (Rabasse et al. 1983), Mexico (Remaudiere and Hennebert, 1980), Portugal and Spain (Humber, 1986) and also Japan (Kobayashi et al.,1984). Panicum miliaceum or broomcorn millets were trialled in 2003 as a production base (within labs) for the fungus. However, difficulty with mass production of infectious spores in vitro and the viable formulation and storage into an easily applicable commercial product has halted their direct use as a biological control in 2012.

There is limited evidence that the ladybird Harmonia axyridis, which is invasive in America and Europe, has an advantage over native ladybird species because it feeds more on Pandora-infested aphid cadavers.

Pandora formicae (Humber & Bałazy) Humber is a rare example of the entomophthoralean fungus that has adapted to exclusively infect social insects, such as the wood ant Formica polyctena. The proportion of dead ant bodies with resting spores increased from late summer throughout autumn, which suggests that these fungal spores are the main overwintering fungal structures.

Pandora sp. nov. inedit. (ARSEF13372) is a recently isolated fungus species with high potential for usage in psyllid pest control. Experiments in biomass production are being studied for usefulness.

== Species ==
As accepted by Species Fungorum;

- Pandora aleurodis (Bałazy & Manole) S. Keller (2005)
- Pandora bibionis Z.Z. Li, B. Huang & M.Z. Fan (1997)
- Pandora blunckii (G. Lakon ex G. Zimm.) Humber (1989)
- Pandora borea (M.Z. Fan & Z.Z. Li) Z.Z. Li, B. Huang & M.Z. Fan (1997)
- Pandora brahminae (S.K. Bose & P.R. Mehta) Humber (1989)
- Pandora bullata (Thaxt. & D.M. MacLeod ex Humber) Humber (1989)
- Pandora dacnusae (Bałazy) Humber (1989)
- Pandora delphacis (Hori) Humber (1989)
- Pandora dipterigena (Thaxt.) Humber (1989)
- Pandora echinospora (Thaxt.) Humber (1989)
- Pandora formicae (Humber & Bałazy) Humber (1989)
- Pandora gloeospora (Vuill.) Humber (1989)
- Pandora guangdongensis C.S. Jia & B. Hong (2013)
- Pandora heteropterae (Bałazy) S. Keller (2005)
- Pandora kondoiensis (Milner) Humber (1989)
- Pandora lipae (Bałazy, Eilenberg & Papierok) S. Keller (2005)
- Pandora longissima S. Keller (2007)
- Pandora minutispora (S. Keller) S. Keller (2005)
- Pandora muscivora (J. Schröt.) S. Keller (2005)
- Pandora myrmecophaga (Turian & Wuest) S. Keller (2005)
- Pandora neoaphidis (Remaud. & Hennebert) Humber (1989)
- Pandora nouryi (Remaud. & Hennebert) Humber (1989)
- Pandora phalangicida (Lagerh.) Humber (1989)
- Pandora philonthi (Bałazy) S. Keller (2005)
- Pandora phyllobii (Bałazy) S. Keller (2005)
- Pandora poloniae-majoris (Bałazy) S. Keller (2005)
- Pandora psocopterae S. Keller (2011)
- Pandora sciarae Olive ex S. Keller (2007)
- Pandora shaanxiensis M.Z. Fan & Z.Z. Li (1994)
- Pandora terrestris (Gres & Koval) S. Keller (2005)
- Pandora uroleuconii Barta & Cagáň (2003)

Former species;

- P. americana (Thaxt.) S. Keller (2007) = Furia americana, Entomophthoraceae
- P. athaliae (Z.Z. Li & M.Z. Fan) Z.Z. Li, M.Z. Fan & B. Huang (1998) = Zoophthora athaliae, Entomophthoraceae
- P. calliphorae (Giard) Humber (1989) = Entomophthora calliphorae, Entomophthoraceae
- P. chironomi M.Z. Fan & Z.Z. Li (1994) = Erynia chironomi, Entomophthoraceae
- P. cicadellis (Z.Z. Li & M.Z. Fan) Z.Z. Li, M.Z. Fan & B. Huang (1998) = Erynia cicadellis, Entomophthoraceae
- P. suturalis (Ben Ze'ev) Humber (1989) = Zoophthora suturalis, Entomophthoraceae
