= Completoria =

Scientific classification
- Kingdom: Fungi
- Division: Entomophthoromycota
- Class: Entomophthoromycetes
- Order: Entomophthorales
- Family: Completoriaceae; Humber (1989)
- Genus: Completoria; Lohde (1874)
- Species: C. complens

Binomial name
- Completoria complens Lohde (1874)

Single-species genus of fungi

Completoria is a fungal genus in the monotypic family Completoriaceae, of the order Entomophthorales. Completoria is itself monotypic, containing a single species, Completoria complens. The species is rare, known only from greenhouse cultures where it grows as an obligate intracellular parasite of fern gametophytes.
