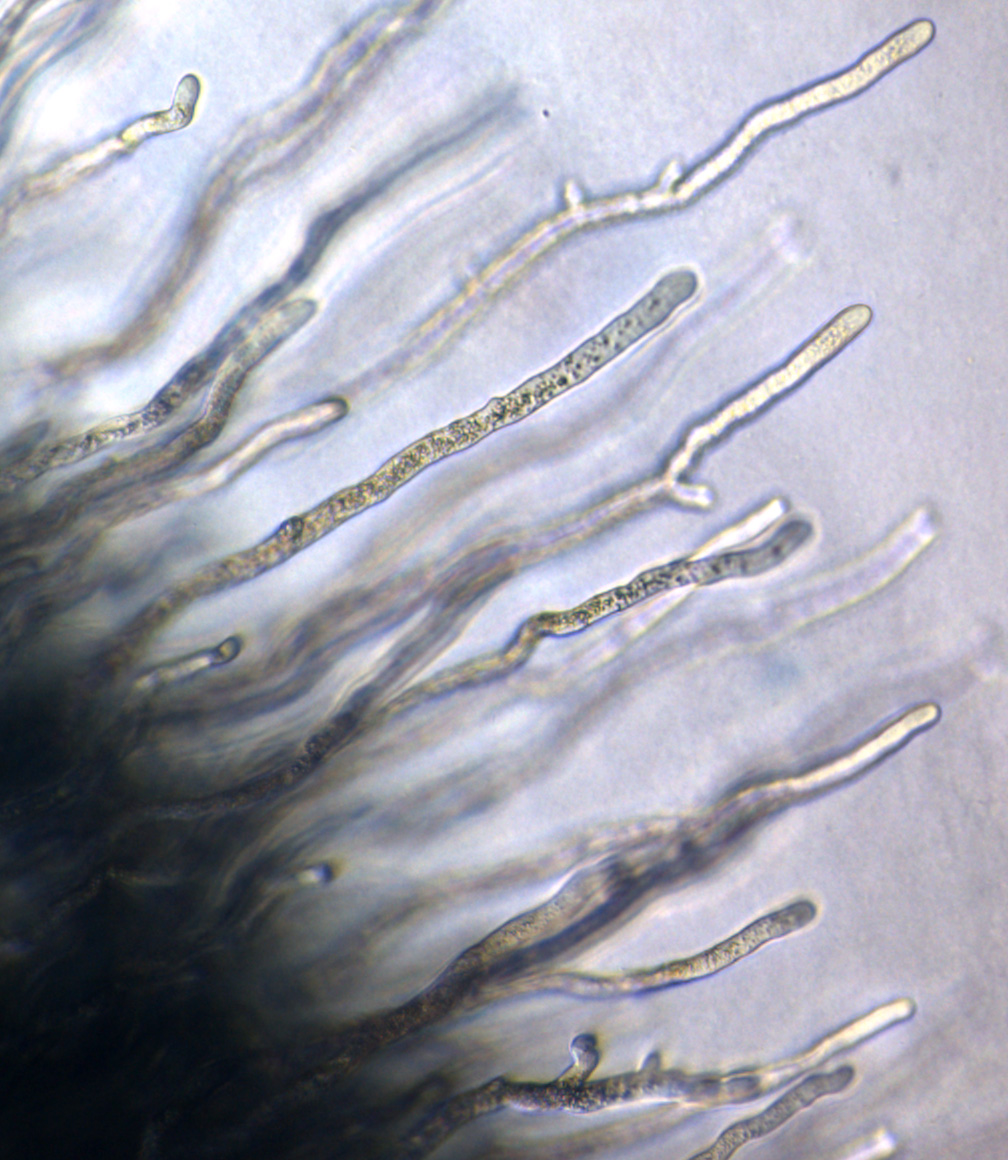
- Conidiobolus firmipilleus on surface of agar petri dish

Scientific classification
- Kingdom: Fungi
- Division: Entomophthoromycota
- Class: Entomophthoromycetes
- Order: Entomophthorales
- Family: Ancylistaceae
- Genus: Conidiobolus; Bref. 1884 em. Humber 1989

Type species
- Conidiobolus utriculosus Bref.

Synonyms
- Conidiobolus (Conidiobolus) Brefeld 1884; Conidiobolus (Capillidium) Ben-Ze’ev & Kenneth 1982; Capillidium (Ben-Ze’ev & Kenneth 1982) Huang & Nie 2020; Boudierella Costantin 1897; Delacroixia Saccardo & Sydow 1899; Conidiobolus (Delacroixia) (Saccardo & Sydow 1899) Tyrrell & MacLeod 1972

= Conidiobolus =

Genus of fungi

Conidiobolus is a genus of fungi in the order Entomophthorales. Some species were initially defined in Conidiobolus but then moved into other genera such as Capillidium and Batkoa.

The genus name Conidiobolus was first introduced in 1884 by Brefeld and was proposed due to differences in its conidia.

Members of this genus are typically saprophytic, living in the soil with vegetation and decaying organic matter. They are most commonly found in tropical regions.

Some members of this genus may cause a human infection known as conidiobolomycosis; others are invertebrate pathogens. Only three species have been identified in mammalian infection: C. coronatus, C. incongruus, and C. lamprauges.

== Taxonomic characteristics ==
In the Conidiobolus genus, at least four types of asexual conidia have been reported. Sexual structures (zygospores) have been found in most of the members in this genus, but not in C. coronatus. However, while growing in water agar plates, C. coronatus develops villose conidia, a unique taxonomic characteristic used for its identification in clinical isolates.

The hyphae are broad, thin walled and occasionally septate. They are best visualized with hematoxylin and eosin when viewing clinical specimens.

For Conidiobolus, the best environment for germination is achieved with high humidity from 98 to 100% and temperatures between 16 and 30 °C.

== Medical Relevance ==
Conidiobolomycosis in humans was first described in 1961 based on histopathological analysis of a facial lesion. The first well-documented case of human Conidiobolus infection was in an 11-year-old from the Grand Cayman Island.

Conidiobolomycosis is most common in the rainforests of Africa, South and Central America, and Southeast Asia. There is a significant predominance of cases in males, particularly those who work and live in tropical rainforests. Some isolated cases from the United Kingdom and the East coast of the United States have been reported.

In endemic areas, basidiobolomycosis and conidiobolomycosis can most easily be distinguished from one another by the anatomic location of the infection and the age of the patient. The diagnosis is typically made by biopsy of the infected tissue.

=== Treatment ===
No single drug has been proven to be effective in treating all Conidiobolus cases, and due its rarity, no treatment regimens have been directly compared to determine the best course. Amphotericin B exhibits relatively high MICs, while itraconazole and ketoconazole have good in vitro activities. In addition to antifungal therapy, surgical debridement may be necessary.

== Species ==
As of 2018 MycoBank included the following species of Conidiobolus:

- Conidiobolus antarcticus S. Tosi, Caretta & Humber, 2004
- Conidiobolus apiculatus
- Conidiobolus bangalorensis Sriniv. & Thirum., 1967
- Conidiobolus batkoi
- Conidiobolus brefeldianus Couch, 1939
- Conidiobolus caecilius S. Keller, 2007
- Conidiobolus carpentieri (Giard) Remaud. & S. Keller, 1980
- Conidiobolus cercopidis
- Conidiobolus cercopidis
- Conidiobolus chlamydosporus Drechsler, 1955
- Conidiobolus chlapowskii Bałazy, J. Wiśn. & S. Kaczm., 1987
- Conidiobolus conglomeratus
- Conidiobolus coronatus (Costantin) A. Batko, 1964
- Conidiobolus couchii Sriniv. & Thirum., 1968
- Conidiobolus dabieshanensis Y. Nie & B. Huang, 2017
- Conidiobolus denaeosporus Drechsler, 1957
- Conidiobolus destruens
- Conidiobolus eurymitus Drechsler, 1965
- Conidiobolus eurypus Drechsler, 1957
- Conidiobolus firmipilleus Drechsler, 1953
- Conidiobolus giganteus
- Conidiobolus globuliferus Drechsler, 1957
- Conidiobolus gonimodes Drechsler, 1962
- Conidiobolus grylli
- Conidiobolus gustafssonii Bałazy, 1993
- Conidiobolus humicola Sriniv. & Thirum., 1962
- Conidiobolus incongruus Drechsler, 1960
- Conidiobolus inordinatus Drechsler, 1957
- Conidiobolus iuxtagenitus S. D. Waters & Callaghan, 1989
- Conidiobolus khandalensis Sriniv. & Thirum., 1963
- Conidiobolus lachnodes Drechsler, 1955
- Conidiobolus lamprauges Drechsler, 1953
- Conidiobolus lichenicola Sriniv. & Thirum., 1968
- Conidiobolus lobatus Sriniv. & Thirum., 1968
- Conidiobolus macrosporus Sriniv. & Thirum., 1967
- Conidiobolus major
- Conidiobolus margaritatus B. Huang, Humber & K. T. Hodge, 2007
- Conidiobolus megalotocus Drechsler, 1957
- Conidiobolus minor
- Conidiobolus multivagus Drechsler, 1960
- Conidiobolus mycophagus Sriniv. & Thirum., 1965
- Conidiobolus mycophilus Sriniv. & Thirum., 1965
- Conidiobolus nanodes Drechsler, 1955
- Conidiobolus nodosus Sriniv. & Thirum., 1967
- Conidiobolus obscurus (I. M. Hall & P. H. Dunn) Remaud. & S. Keller, 1980
- Conidiobolus papillatus
- Conidiobolus parvus Drechsler, 1962
- Conidiobolus paulus Drechsler, 1957
- Conidiobolus polyspermus Drechsler, 1962
- Conidiobolus polytocus Drechsler, 1955
- Conidiobolus pseudapiculatus
- Conidiobolus pseudapiculatus
- Conidiobolus pseudococci
- Conidiobolus pseudococcus
- Conidiobolus pumilus Drechsler, 1955
- Conidiobolus rhynchosporus Drechsler, 1954
- Conidiobolus rhysosporus Drechsler, 1954
- Conidiobolus rugosus Drechsler, 1955
- Conidiobolus sinensis Y. Nie, X. Y. Liu & B. Huang, 2012
- Conidiobolus stilbeus Y. Nie & B. Huang, 2016
- Conidiobolus stromoideus Sriniv. & Thirum., 1963
- Conidiobolus tenthredinis
- Conidiobolus terrestris Sriniv. & Thirum., 1968
- Conidiobolus thermophilus Waing., S. K. Singh & M. C. Sriniv., 2008
- Conidiobolus thromboides Drechsler, 1953
- Conidiobolus tipulae
- Conidiobolus undulatus Drechsler, 1957
- Conidiobolus utriculosus Bref., 1884
- Conidiobolus villosus

Note

- Conidiobolus adieretus Drechsler, 1953 (= Capillidium adiaeretum (Drechsler) B. Huang & Y. Nie (2020))
- Conidiobolus heterosporus Drechsler, 1953 (= Capillidium heterosporum (Drechsler) B. Huang & Y. Nie (2020) )
