= Neozygites =

Scientific classification
- Kingdom: Fungi
- Division: Entomophthoromycota
- Class: Entomophthoromycetes
- Order: Entomophthorales
- Family: Neozygitaceae
- Genus: Neozygites; Witlaczil

Genus of fungi

Neozygites is a genus of fungi in the family Neozygitaceae, which is in the order Entomophthorales. Commonly used as a pest controller for mites, aphids, and thrips, the genus was described in 1885 by E. Witlaczil.

== Distribution and habitat ==
Neozygites fresenii has been found in Europe, the Americas, and South Africa.

== Ecology ==
The main hosts of Neozygites species are mites and aphids; Neozygites fresenii epizootics have been found in colonies of Aphis gossypii in Arkansas, causing a notable reduction in populations of them. Several species of the genus were first described on spider mites, namely N. adjarica, N. floridana, N. tetranychi, and N. tanajoae; Neozygites tanajoae is known to exclusively affect spider mites on Venezuelan and Colombian manioc. Its pest-controlling properties have seen N. tanajoae used in Benin to dissipate Mononychellus tanajoa populations. The red spider mite is a known host of the epizootics of N. floridana, being affected by the fungus on tomatoes in Brazil. N. floridana is known to have the ability to significantly lessen the populations of red spider mites, but gratuitous fungicide use can negatively impact the fungus. The genus is also known to affect thrips.

== Taxonomy ==
In 1987, a new genus Thaxterosporium was proposed, consisting only of N. turbinatus. In 1991, the genus was synonymized with Neozygites. The genus Neozygites consists of the following 20 species:

- Neozygites abacaridis Miętk. & Bałazy
- Neozygites acaridis (Petch) Milner
- Neozygites adjaricus (Tsints. & Vartap.) Remaud. & S.Keller
- Neozygites cinarae S.Keller
- Neozygites cucumeriformis Miętk. & Bałazy
- Neozygites floridanus (J.Weiser & Muma) Remaud. & S.Keller
- Neozygites fresenii (Nowak.) Remaud. & S.Keller
- Neozygites fumosa (Speare) Remaud. & S.Keller
- Neozygites heteropsyllae Villac. & Wilding
- Neozygites lageniformis (Thaxt.) Remaud. & S.Keller
- Neozygites lecanii (Zimm.) Ben Ze'ev & R.G.Kenneth
- Neozygites linanensis Xiang Zhou & C.Montalva
- Neozygites microlophii S.Keller
- Neozygites osornensis C.Montalva & Barta
- Neozygites parvisporus (D.M.MacLeod & K.P.Carl) Remaud. & S.Keller
- Neozygites remaudierei S.Keller
- Neozygites slavi S.Keller
- Neozygites tanajoae Delal., Humber & A.E.Hajek
- Neozygites tetranychi (J.Weiser) Remaud. & S.Keller
- Neozygites turbinatus (R.G.Kenneth) Remaud. & S.Keller

In addition to these species, two are yet to be classified:

- Neozygites sp. N51
- Neozygites sp. XZ-2015
