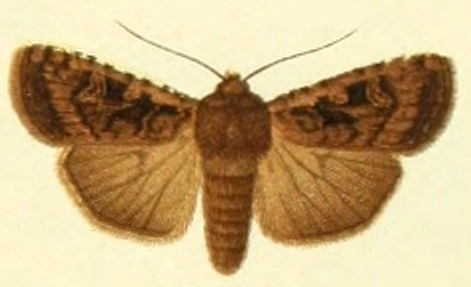

Scientific classification
- Kingdom: Animalia
- Phylum: Arthropoda
- Class: Insecta
- Order: Lepidoptera
- Superfamily: Noctuoidea
- Family: Noctuidae
- Genus: Euxoa
- Species: E. ochrogaster

Binomial name
- Euxoa ochrogaster (Guenée, 1852)

Synonyms
- Euxoa rossica; Noctua ochrogaster Guenée, 1852; Agrotis insignata Walker, [1857]; Agrotis illata Walker, 1857; Agrotis subsignata Walker, 1865; Agrotis cinereomacula Morrison, 1875; Agrotis turris Grote, 1875; Agrotis gularis Grote, 1875; Agrotis islandica Staudinger, 1857

= Euxoa ochrogaster =

Species of moth

Euxoa ochrogaster, the red-backed cutworm, is a moth of the family Noctuidae. It is found from Iceland and northern Europe, through the Baltic to the Amur region. In North America, it is found from Alaska to Newfoundland and Labrador, south into the northern part of the United States, south in Rocky Mountains to Arizona and New Mexico.

Adults are on wing from the end of July to beginning of September.

The larvae feed on a variety of broad leaf plants and grasses, including Plantago species. The species is economically important on Helianthus annuus in North America.

The moths can be affected by a fungus Tarichium megaspermum (from order Entomophthorales), in British Columbia, Canada.

== Subspecies ==
- Euxoa ochrogaster ochrogaster
- Euxoa ochrogaster islandica (Iceland)
- Euxoa ochrogaster rossica (Lithuania to Amur)
