= Strongwellsea =

Scientific classification
- Kingdom: Fungi
- Division: Entomophthoromycota
- Class: Entomophthoromycetes
- Order: Entomophthorales
- Genus: Strongwellsea; A.Batko & J.Weiser 1965

Genus of fungi

Strongwellsea is a genus of fungi within the order Entomophthorales of the Zygomycota. They are known to infect insects. Infected adult dipteran hosts (flies from Anthomyiidae, Fanniidae, Muscidae, and Scathophagidae families) develop a large hole in their abdomens, through which conidia (spores) are then actively discharged while the hosts are still alive.

While most fungi spore once the host is dead, with the Strongwellsea fungus, the flying host continues to live for days and also socialising with other flies while the fungus consumes its genitals, fat reserves, reproductive organs, and then finally its muscle, as it continues to emit thousands of spores on to other individuals and hosts. Then the host fly dies. The method of keeping the host alive while still releasing spores is called active host transmission (AHT). The fungi spores are almost shaped like torpedoes and are designed for going fast (through the air). If they land on another fly host, they stick to the cuticle and then migrate their way into the abdomen, where they start to generate spores. Thousands of spores can be released out from a single fly host.

They were first found in Denmark, with 3 known species. Strongwellsea castrans, Strongwellsea magna and Strongwellsea pratensis.

Species Strongwellsea crypta is known to infect Botanophila fugax (Diptera: Anthomyiidae) and Strongwellsea castrans, is the only described species infecting flies from Anthomyiidae. Strongwellsea selandia and Strongwellsea gefion infects adult flies from genus Helina (Diptera: Muscidae). Strongwellsea tigrinae and Strongwellsea acerosa infect hosts from the genus Coenosia (Muscidae).

In lab tests in 1992, Strongwellsea castrans was isolated in vitro and then incubating conidia was projected from infected cabbage root flies (Delia radicum). This showed that the fungus could infect other fly species.

The genus was circumscribed by Andrzej Batko and Jaroslav Weiser in J. Invertebr. Pathol. vol.7 on pages 460-463 in 1965.

The genus name of Strongwellsea is named after the 3 authors of a 1960 book, 'An Unidentified Fungus Parasitic on the SeedCorn Maggot'; Frank E. Strong, Kenneth Wells and James W. Apple (an American entomologist, University of Wisconsin–Madison), "Generic name in honor of the authors of the preliminary report".

== Species ==
As accepted by Species Fungorum;

- Strongwellsea acerosa Eilenberg & Humber (2020)
- Strongwellsea castrans A. Batko & J. Weiser (1965)
- Strongwellsea crypta Eilenberg & Humber (2021)
- Strongwellsea gefion Eilenberg & Humber (2022)
- Strongwellsea magna Humber (1976)
- Strongwellsea pratensis S. Keller (2007)
- Strongwellsea selandia Eilenberg & Humber (2022)
- Strongwellsea tigrinae Eilenberg & Humber (2020)

Former species;

- S. oehrensiana Aruta, Carrillo & Monteal. (1984) = Entomophthora oehrensiana, Entomophthoraceae family

== Other sources ==
- Humber RA. 1982. Strongwellsea vs. Erynia : the case for a phylogenetic classification of the Entomophthorales (Zygomycetes). Mycotaxon 15: 167–184.
