= Erynia (fungus) =

Scientific classification
- Kingdom: Fungi
- Division: Entomophthoromycota
- Class: Entomophthoromycetes
- Order: Entomophthorales
- Family: Entomophthoraceae
- Genus: Erynia (Nowak. ex A. Batko) Remaud. & Hennebert, 1980

Synonyms
- Erynia Nowak., 1881; Zoophthora subgen. Erynia Nowak. ex A. Batko, 1966

Genus of fungi

Erynia is a genus of fungi within the family of Entomophthoraceae and order Entomophthorales. This has been supported by molecular phylogenetic analysis.

The genus name Erynia was originally named by the Polish scientist Leon Nowakowski in 1881. It was named after the Greek mythological creatures known as the Erinyes or as the Romans called them, the Furies, who were described as spirits that claimed vengeance against a crime. It could be classed as an insect pest feeding on a plant, being a specific crime for which the fungus would kill the insect, thus exacting vengeance.

== Distribution ==
It has a cosmopolitan distribution (scattered worldwide). Including Switzerland.

== Hosts ==
Species Erynia conica infects two types of mosquitos; Aedes aegypti and Culex restuans.

== Species ==
As accepted by Species Fungorum;

- Erynia aquatica (J.F. Anderson & Ringo ex J.F. Anderson & Anagnost.) Humber (1981)
- Erynia chironomi (M.Z. Fan & Z.Z. Li) M.Z. Fan & Z.Z. Li (1995)
- Erynia cicadellis Z.Z. Li & M.Z. Fan (1992)
- Erynia conica (Nowak.) Remaud. & Hennebert (1980)
- Erynia curvispora (Nowak.) Remaud. & Hennebert (1980)
- Erynia delpiniana (Cavara) Humber (1981)
- Erynia fluvialis S. Keller (2007)
- Erynia gigantea Z.Z. Li, Z.A. Chen & Y.W. Xu (1990)
- Erynia gracilis (Thaxt.) Remaud. & Hennebert (1980)
- Erynia henrici (Molliard) Humber & Ben Ze'ev (1981)
- Erynia jaczewskii (Zaprom.) Humber (1981)
- Erynia nebriae (Raunk.) S. Keller (2018)
- Erynia ovispora (Nowak.) Remaud. & Hennebert (1980)
- Erynia pentatomis Z.Z. Li (1989)
- Erynia phalangicida (Lagerh.) Remaud. & Hennebert (1980)
- Erynia phalloides (A. Batko) Humber & Ben Ze'ev (1981)
- Erynia plecopteri Descals & J. Webster (1984)
- Erynia rhizospora (Thaxt.) Remaud. & Hennebert (1980)
- Erynia sepulchralis (Thaxt.) Remaud. & Hennebert (1980)
- Erynia thurgoviensis S. Keller (2012)
- Erynia triangularis Villac. & Wilding (1994)
- Erynia tumefacta S. Keller (2007)
- Erynia variabilis (Thaxt.) Remaud. & Hennebert (1980)

Former species; (all family Entomophthoraceae)

- E. americana (Thaxt.) Remaud. & Hennebert (1980) = Furia americana
- E. anglica (Petch) Ben Ze'ev (1986) = Zoophthora anglica
- E. anhuiensis Z.Z. Li (1986) = Zoophthora anhuiensis
- E. aphidis (H. Hoffm.) Humber & Ben Ze'ev (1981) = Zoophthora aphidis
- E. athaliae Z.Z. Li & M.Z. Fan (1991) = Zoophthora athaliae
- E. blunckii (G. Lakon ex G. Zimm.) Remaud. & Hennebert (1980) = Pandora blunckii
- E. borea M.Z. Fan & Z.Z. Li (1991) = Pandora borea
- E. brahminae (S.K. Bose & P.R. Mehta) Remaud. & Hennebert (1980) = Pandora brahminae
- E. bullata Remaud. & Hennebert (1980) = Pandora bullata
- E. bullata Thaxt. & D.M. MacLeod ex Humber (1981) = Pandora bullata
- E. calliphorae (Giard) Remaud. & Hennebert (1980) = Entomophthora calliphorae
- E. canadensis (D.M. MacLeod, Tyrrell & R.S. Soper) Humber & Ben Ze'ev (1981) = Zoophthora canadensis
- E. caroliniana (Thaxt.) Remaud. & Hennebert (1980) = Eryniopsis caroliniana
- E. castrans (A. Batko & J. Weiser) Remaud. & S. Keller (1980) = Strongwellsea castrans
- E. coleopterorum (Petch) Humber & Ben Ze'ev (1981) = Entomophthora coleopterorum
- E. crassitunicata (S. Keller) Humber & Ben Ze'ev (1981) = Zoophthora crassitunicata
- E. creatonoti D.F. Yen ex Remaud. & Hennebert (1980) = Furia creatonoti
- E. creatonoti D.F. Yen ex Humber (1981) = Furia creatonoti
- E. crustosa (D.M. MacLeod & Tyrrell) Humber & Ben Ze'ev (1981) = Furia gastropachae
- E. dacnusae Bałazy (1982) = Pandora dacnusae
- E. delphacis (Hori) Humber (1981) = Pandora delphacis
- E. dipterigena (Thaxt.) Remaud. & Hennebert (1980) = Pandora dipterigena
- E. echinospora (Thaxt.) Remaud. & Hennebert (1980) = Pandora echinospora
- E. elateridiphaga (Turian) Humber, Ben Ze'ev & R.G. Kenneth (1981) = Zoophthora elateridiphaga
- E. ellisiana Ben Ze'ev (1986) = Furia ellisiana
- E. erinacea (Ben Ze'ev & R.G. Kenneth) Remaud. & Hennebert (1980) = Zoophthora erinacea
- E. forficulae (Giard) Bałazy (1986) = Zoophthora forficulae
- E. formicae Humber & Bałazy (1981) = Pandora formicae
- E. geometralis (Thaxt.) Humber & Ben Ze'ev (1981) = Zoophthora geometralis
- E. gloeospora (Vuill.) Remaud. & Hennebert (1980) = Pandora gloeospora
- E. humberi Aruta & Carrillo (1989) = Zoophthora humberi
- E. ithacensis J.P. Kramer (1981) = Furia ithacensis
- E. kondoiensis Milner (1983) = Pandora kondoiensis
- E. lanceolata (S. Keller) Humber & Ben Ze'ev (1981) = Zoophthora lanceolata
- E. magna (Humber) Remaud. & S. Keller (1980) = Strongwellsea magna
- E. minutispora S. Keller (1994) = Pandora minutispora
- E. montana (Thaxt.) Remaud. & Hennebert (1980) = Furia montana
- E. myrmecophaga Turian & Wuest ex Remaud. & Hennebert (1980) = Pandora myrmecophaga
- E. neoaphidis Remaud. & Hennebert (1980) = Pandora neoaphidis
- E. neopyralidarum Ben Ze'ev (1982) = Furia neopyralidarum
- E. nouryi Remaud. & Hennebert (1980) = Pandora nouryi
- E. occidentalis (Thaxt.) Humber & Ben Ze'ev (1981) = Zoophthora occidentalis
- E. orientalis (Ben Ze'ev & R.G. Kenneth) Humber, Ben Ze'ev & R.G. Kenneth (1981) = Zoophthora orientalis
- E. petchii (Ben Ze'ev & R.G. Kenneth) Ben Ze'ev & R.G. Kenneth (1982) = Zoophthora petchii
- E. phytonomi (Arthur) Humber, Ben Ze'ev & R.G. Kenneth (1981) = Zoophthora phytonomi
- E. pieris Z.Z. Li & Humber (1984) = Furia pieris
- E. radicans (Bref.) Humber, Ben Ze'ev & R.G. Kenneth (1981) = Zoophthora radicans
- E. suturalis Ben Ze'ev (1987) = Zoophthora suturalis
- E. virescens (Thaxt.) Remaud. & Hennebert (1980) = Furia virescens
- E. vomitoriae (Rozsypal) Remaud. & Hennebert (1980) = Furia vomitoriae
- E. zabri Rozsypal ex Ben Ze'ev & R.G. Kenneth (1982) = Furia zabri
