= Zoophthora =

Scientific classification
- Kingdom: Fungi
- Division: Entomophthoromycota
- Class: Entomophthoromycetes
- Order: Entomophthorales
- Family: Entomophthoraceae
- Genus: Zoophthora; A.Batko 1964

Synonyms
- Zoophthora (Zoophthora) Batko 1964; Erynia (Zoophthora) (Batko 1964) Ben-Ze'ev & Kenneth 1982

Genus of fungi

Zoophthora is a genus of fungi in the family Entomophthoraceae. Like other taxa in this family, Zoophthora species cause disease in insects and as such are considered entomopathogenic fungi.

Like most entomopathogenic fungal taxa, Zoophthora has been studied largely in the context of biological control of insect pest species. However, recent research indicates that many fungal taxa that have historically been considered entomopathogenic (e.g., Zoophthora) may serve diverse ecological roles as free-living members of the rhizosphere, as endophytes of plant tissue, and as saprobes.

== History ==
The genus Zoophthora was first formally described by Batko in 1964; however, in 1966 Batko divided Zoophthora into four sub-genera. In 1989 Humber promoted Batko's four sub-genera to a single genus: Zoophthora.

Recent systematic research has yielded support for the monophyly of Zoophthora, as well as its distinctness at the generic level.

== Life cycle ==
Zoophthora species parasitize insects, using their host's body as a source of nutrition and as a site for reproduction. In order to infect a potential insect host, fungal tissue (generally as uninucleate or coenocytic hypha) must first penetrate the insect's cuticle. Upon entering an insect's body, some Zoophthora species are able to lose their cell walls and exist as protoplasts; this phenomenon is common in many taxa in the Entomophthorales, and is believed to help the fungus evade its host's immune responses.

Asexual reproduction in Zoophthora occurs through the production and forceful discharge of primary conidia. Once these conidia contact a suitable substrate, they can then either germinate into vegetative tissue (i.e., mycelium) or develop secondary conidia. Sexual reproduction in this taxon generally occurs through the conjugation of two gametangia, which results in the production of a thick-walled zygosporangium. As in other Zygomycete fungi, the zygosporangia of Zoophthora serve as the site where zygospores mature and germinate into vegetative tissue.

== Ecology ==
Interactions with Arthropods

Perhaps the most studied aspect of Zoophthora species’ ecology pertains to their interactions with arthropods. Zoophthora species are parasites that digest their hosts’ tissues for nutrition. Fungi in this taxon also use the host's body as a substrate on which to reproduce. During this process of infection, digestion, and reproduction, the host is generally killed and as such these interactions between fungus and insect are best described as antagonistic.

Because research on Zoophthora has historically been in the context of biological control of insect pests, the relative contributions of species in this genus to ecosystem functioning have been unexplored. As such, the extent of Zoophthora species’ contributions in controlling insect populations in natural ecosystems is poorly understood.

Interactions outside of Arthropods

While ecological interactions outside of arthropod hosts have been explored in a handful of entomopathogenic fungal taxa, the roles of Zoophthora species in soils, plants, and other environments need to be explored.

== Methods for isolation and identification ==
Isolation

While approaches to isolating pure cultures of Zoophthora and other entomopathogenic fungal taxa vary, two general approaches are widely used: direct and indirect sampling.

- Direct sampling:

In direct sampling methods, fungal tissue (generally as conidia, and sometimes as hyphal bodies or protoplasts) is removed from infected arthropod hosts. This tissue is generally subcultured on a nutrient-rich medium, such as Sabouraud's Dextrose Agar or Potato Dextrose Agar. These media are frequently supplemented with egg yolk.

- Indirect sampling:

In indirect sampling methods, fungal tissue is isolated from indirect sources, such as soil or plant material. Approaches to indirect sampling vary, but many methods use whole insects or insect tissues as “bait”. When fungal propagules from an environmental sample infect the “bait” organism, the infected insect can be surface-sterilized, placed in conditions favorable for fungal growth, and monitored for the emergence of fungal propagules from host parts.

In some cases, indirect sampling methods can be used when using direct sampling poses logistical concerns. In these instances, indirect sampling approaches can be used to prompt fungal tissue to spread from host tissue to another substrate, where propagules (e.g., conidia) can be isolated more easily.

Identification

Historically, the nuclear status and morphology of the cells comprising conidiophores in Zoophthora have been used to distinguish this taxon from other genera. Species-level distinctions are difficult to make between members of this genus using morphology alone, but the presence/absence and morphology of the characters listed below have been used to distinguish Zoophthora species with some success:

- Conidiophores
- Primary conidia
- Secondary conidia
- Resting spores
- Hyphal bodies
- Rhizoids
- Nuclei

With the advent of the use of molecular markers in inferring phylogenetic information, it is likely that estimates of species-level diversity in Zoophthora will become clearer as more research is conducted. Especially promising are approaches to species identification that do not require the isolation and cultivation of fungal tissue from the environment, such as pyrosequencing. Such cultivation-independent approaches to species identification are advantageous because they allow for the identification of taxa that are difficult or impossible to cultivate in the laboratory. Cultivation-independent approaches to species identification can also save time and materials, and can allow morphologically indistinguishable taxa to be differentiated.

== Species ==
As accepted by Species Fungorum;

- Zoophthora anglica (Petch) Humber (1989)
- Zoophthora anhuiensis (Z.Z. Li) Humber (1989)
- Zoophthora aphidis (H. Hoffm.) A. Batko (1964)
- Zoophthora aphrophorae (Rostr.) S. Keller (2007)
- Zoophthora arginis Bałazy (1993)
- Zoophthora athaliae (Z.Z. Li & M.Z. Fan) Bałazy (1993)
- Zoophthora autumnalis Bałazy (1993)
- Zoophthora bialoviezensis Bałazy (1993)
- Zoophthora brevispora Bałazy (1993)
- Zoophthora canadensis (D.M. MacLeod, Tyrrell & R.S. Soper) Remaud. & Hennebert (1980)
- Zoophthora crassispora Bałazy (1993)
- Zoophthora crassitunicata S. Keller (1980)
- Zoophthora elateridiphaga (Turian) Ben Ze'ev & R.G. Kenneth (1980)
- Zoophthora erinacea Ben Ze'ev & R.G. Kenneth (1979)
- Zoophthora falcata Bałazy (1993)
- Zoophthora forficulae (Giard) A. Batko (1964)
- Zoophthora geometralis (Thaxt.) A. Batko (1964)
- Zoophthora giardii Bałazy (1993)
- Zoophthora humberi (Aruta & Carrillo) Bałazy (1993)
- Zoophthora ichneumonis Bałazy (1993)
- Zoophthora independentia A.E. Hajek, Humber & Gryganskyi (2016)
- Zoophthora lanceolata S. Keller (1980)
- Zoophthora larvivora Bałazy (1993)
- Zoophthora miridis Bałazy & Miętk. (1993)
- Zoophthora myrmecophaga Turian & Wuest (1977)
- Zoophthora nematoceris Bałazy (1993)
- Zoophthora obtusa Bałazy (1993)
- Zoophthora occidentalis (Thaxt.) A. Batko (1964)
- Zoophthora opomyzae Bałazy & Miętk. (1993)
- Zoophthora orientalis Ben Ze'ev & R.G. Kenneth (1981)
- Zoophthora petchii Ben Ze'ev & R.G. Kenneth (1981)
- Zoophthora phytonomi (Arthur) A. Batko (1964)
- Zoophthora porteri (R.S. Soper) A.E. Hajek, Humber & Gryganskyi (2016)
- Zoophthora psyllae Bałazy (1993)
- Zoophthora radicans (Bref.) A. Batko (1964)
- Zoophthora rhagonycharum (Bałazy) S. Keller (2007)
- Zoophthora suturalis (Ben Ze'ev) Bałazy (1993)
- Zoophthora tachypori Bałazy (1993)
- Zoophthora viridis S. Keller (1994)

Former species; (all family Entomophthoraceae)

- Z. aleurodis Bałazy & Manole (1993) = Pandora aleurodis
- Z. americana (Thaxt.) A. Batko (1964) = Furia americana
- Z. aquatica (J.F. Anderson & Ringo ex J.F. Anderson & Anagnost.) Bałazy (1993) = Erynia aquatica
- Z. blunckii G. Lakon ex A. Batko (1964) = Pandora blunckii
- Z. brahminae (S.K. Bose & P.R. Mehta) A. Batko (1964) = Pandora brahminae
- Z. bullata Thaxt. & D.M. MacLeod ex A. Batko (1964) = Pandora bullata
- Z. calliphorae (Giard) A. Batko (1964) = Entomophthora calliphorae
- Z. conica (Nowak.) A. Batko (1964) = Erynia conica
- Z. creatonoti D.F. Yen ex Humber (1993) = Furia creatonoti
- Z. curvispora (Nowak.) A. Batko (1964) = Erynia curvispora
- Z. dacnusae (Bałazy) Bałazy (1993) = Pandora dacnusae
- Z. delphacis (Hori) Bałazy (1993) = Pandora delphacis
- Z. delpiniana (Cavara) Bałazy (1993) = Erynia delpiniana
- Z. dipterigena (Thaxt.) A. Batko (1964) = Pandora dipterigena
- Z. echinospora (Thaxt.) A. Batko (1964) = Pandora echinospora
- Z. ellisiana (Ben Ze'ev) Bałazy (1993) = Furia ellisiana
- Z. exitialis (I.M. Hall & P.H. Dunn) A. Batko (1964) = Entomophthora exitialis
- Z. fumimontana Bałazy (1993) = Furia fumimontana
- Z. gastropachae (Racib.) Bałazy (1993) = Furia gastropachae
- Z. gloeospora (Vuill.) A. Batko (1964) = Pandora gloeospora
- Z. gracilis (Thaxt.) A. Batko (1964) = Erynia gracilis
- Z. heteropterae Bałazy (1993) = Pandora heteropterae
- Z. ithacensis (J.P. Kramer) Bałazy (1993) = Furia ithacensis
- Z. jaczewskii (Zaprom.) A. Batko (1964) = Erynia jaczewskii
- Z. kondoiensis (Milner) Bałazy (1993) = Pandora kondoiensis
- Z. lipae Bałazy, Eilenberg & Papierok (1993) = Pandora lipae
- Z. minutispora S. Keller ex Bałazy (1993) = Pandora minutispora
- Z. montana (Thaxt.) A. Batko (1964) = Furia montana
- Z. muscivora (J. Schröt.) Bałazy (1993) = Pandora muscivora
- Z. nebriae (Raunk.) A. Batko (1966) = Erynia nebriae
- Z. neoaphidis (Remaud. & Hennebert) Bałazy (1993) = Pandora neoaphidis
- Z. neopyralidarum (Ben Ze'ev) Bałazy (1993) = Furia neopyralidarum
- Z. nouryi (Remaud. & Hennebert) Ben Ze'ev & R.G. Kenneth (1981) = Pandora nouryi
- Z. ovispora (Nowak.) A. Batko (1964) = Erynia ovispora
- Z. pentatomis (Z.Z. Li) Z.Z. Li, M.Z. Fan & B. Huang (1998) = Erynia pentatomis
- Z. phalangicida (Lagerh.) A. Batko (1966) = Pandora phalangicida
- Z. phalloides A. Batko (1966) = Erynia phalloides
- Z. philonthi Bałazy (1993) = Pandora philonthi
- Z. phyllobii Bałazy (1993) = Pandora phyllobii
- Z. pieris (Z.Z. Li & Humber) Bałazy (1993) = Furia pieris
- Z. plecopteri (Descals & J. Webster) Bałazy (1993) = Erynia plecopteri
- Z. poloniae-majoris Bałazy (1993) = Pandora poloniae-majoris
- Z. rhizospora (Thaxt.) A. Batko (1964) = Erynia rhizospora
- Z. sepulchralis (Thaxt.) A. Batko (1964) = Erynia sepulchralis
- Z. variabilis (Thaxt.) A. Batko (1964) = Erynia variabilis
- Z. virescens (Thaxt.) A. Batko (1964) = Furia virescens
- Z. vomitoriae Rozsypal (1966) = Furia vomitoriae
- Z. zabri (Rozsypal ex Ben Ze'ev & R.G. Kenneth) Bałazy ex Humber (1993) = Furia zabri
