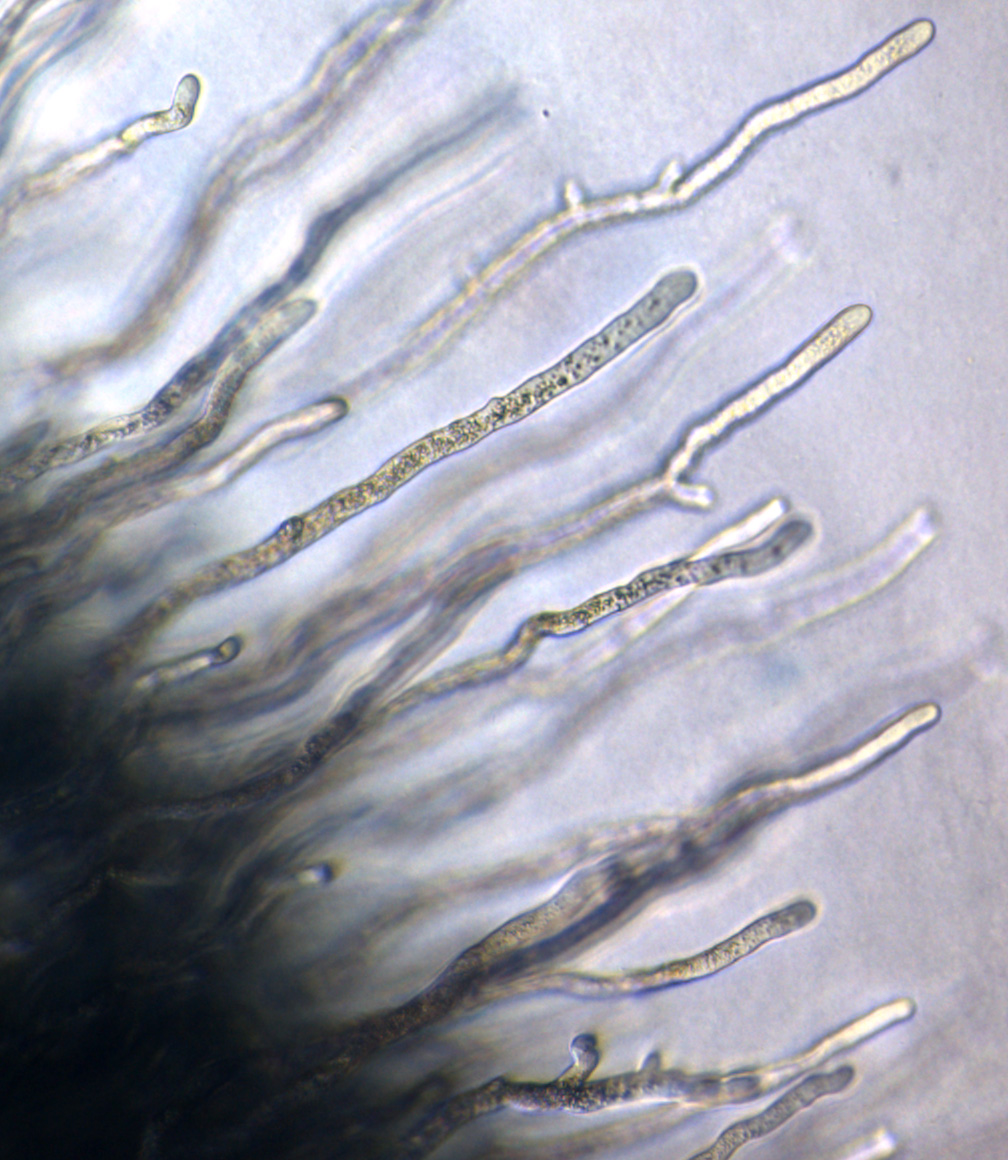
- Conidiobolus firmipilleus on surface of agar petri dish

Scientific classification
- Kingdom: Fungi
- Division: Entomophthoromycota
- Class: Entomophthoromycetes
- Order: Entomophthorales
- Family: Ancylistaceae; Pfitzer 1872 [as 'Ancylisteae']

Genera
- Ancylistes Pfitzer; Capillidium B. Huang & Y. Nie, 2020; Conidiobolus Bref.; Macrobiotophthora Reukauf; Microconidiobolus B. Huang & Y. Nie. Cai et al., 2020; Neoconidiobolus B. Huang & Y. Nie. Cai et al., 2020

= Ancylistaceae =

Family of fungi

The Ancylistaceae are a family of fungi in the order Entomophthorales. The family currently contains the genera: Ancylistes, Macrobiotophthora, Conidiobolus. Capillidium was added in 2020, it was once thought to be a sub-genus of Conidiobolus. Microconidiobolus and Neoconidiobolus were also added in 2020.

== Brief taxonomic history ==
This family was originally an order thought to be included with the aquatic Phycomycetes and included members of Oomycota. It was Helen Berdan, who determined that Ancylistes belonged to order Entomophthorales. Later, the Oomycetes were removed as were several zygomycete genera.

== Morphology ==
The mycelium is coenocytic or irregularly septate. The nuclei are small. During interphase, condense chromatin is absent, but a central nucleolus can be observed. The mycelium can become disjointed. In Ancylistes, who are parasites of desmids (algae form), the hyphae grow toward the ends of the host. As the hyphae grow, branches that follow the groves between plates in the chloroplast are produced. Upon reaching the end, the hyphae grow toward the other end to completely encircle the chloroplast. Septa are produced progressively with segments containing many nuclei. Conidia are produced singly on unbranched sporophores. Like other members of Entomophthorales, conidia are forcibly discharged, which occurs through papillar eversion. Zygospores are formed along the axis of conjugation and can be angular in shape.

== Sexual reproduction ==
Sexual reproduction results in the formation of a zygospore that functions as a resting spore. The zygospore is formed by the fusion of gametangial cells or the scalariform fusion of hyphae. Little is known about the zygospores.

== Ecology ==
The genus Ancylistes are parasites of desmids, a group of green algae. Macrobiotophthora are parasites of tardigrades and nematodes. The genus Conidiobolus are common saprobes and occasional parasites of vertebrates or insects. Capillidium are also parasites of vertebrates or insects.

The most well known member is Conidiobolus coronatus, which is typically found in soils and parasitizing termites and aphids but has been known to infect mammals.
