= Neozygitaceae =

Scientific classification
- Kingdom: Fungi
- Division: Entomophthoromycota
- Class: Entomophthoromycetes
- Order: Entomophthorales
- Family: Neozygitaceae; Ben Ze'ev, R.G.Kenneth & Uziel (1987)

Genera
- Apterivorax; Neozygites

Family of fungi

Neozygitaceae is a family of fungi in the order Entomophthorales. The family was circumscribed in 1987. Originally created to contain the genera Neozygites and Thaxterosporium, the family was distinguished from other similar Entomophthorales families by differences in its nuclear structure, and behaviour during mitosis. The genus Apterivorax was erected and added to the family in 2005. Genus Thaxterosporium has since been synonymised with Neozygites.
