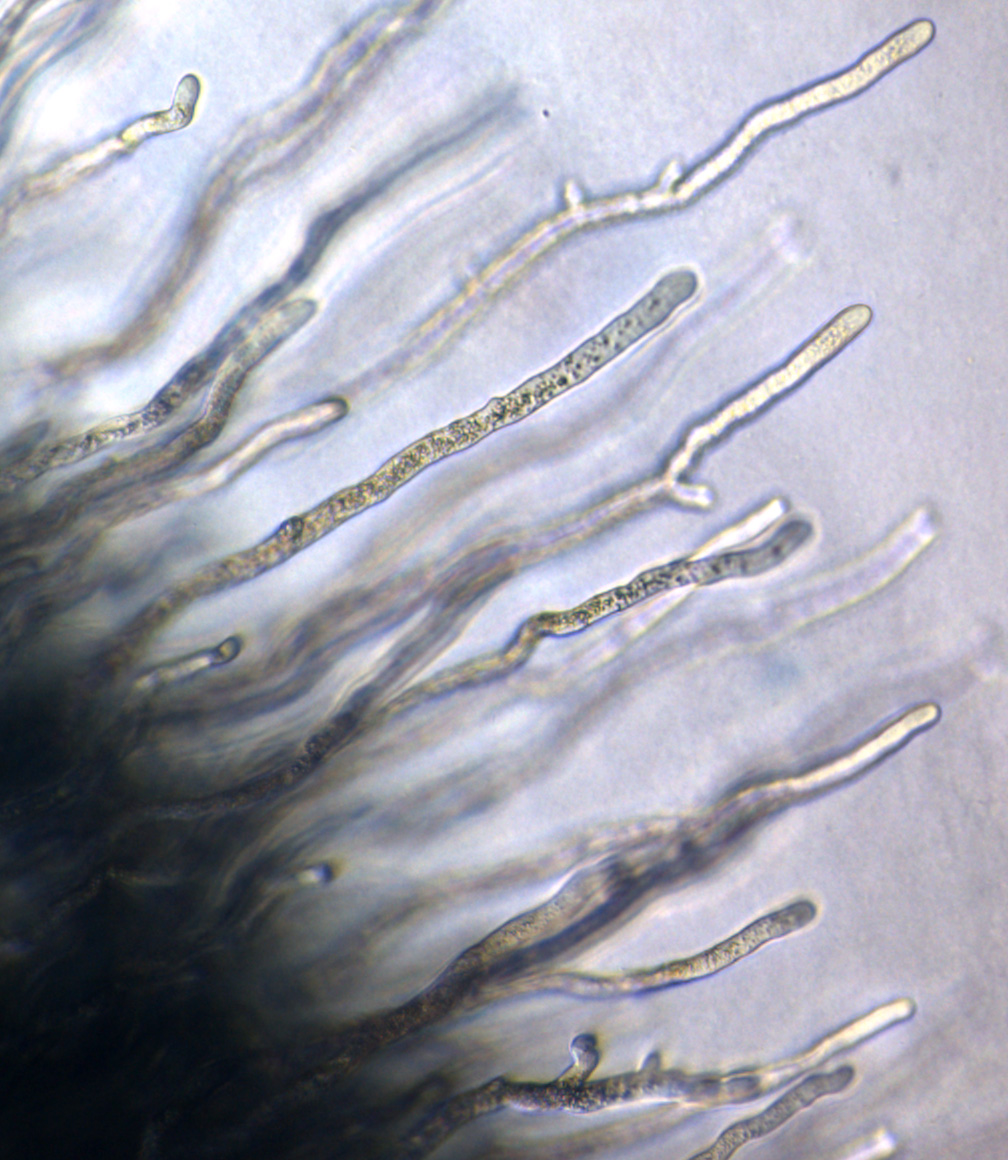
- Conidiobolus firmipilleus on surface of agar petri dish

Scientific classification
- Kingdom: Fungi
- Subkingdom: Zoopagomyceta
- Division: Entomophthoromycota; Humber (2013) emend. Tedersoo et al. (2018)

Classes
- Neozygitomycetes; Entomophthoromycetes

= Entomophthoromycota =

Division of fungi

Entomophthoromycota is a division of kingdom fungi. In 2007, it was placed at the taxonomic rank of subphylum in the most recent revision of the entire fungus kingdom. In 2012, it was raised to the rank of phylum as "Entomophthoromycota" in a scientific paper by Richard A. Humber 2012. Divided into three classes and six families (Ancylistaceae, Basidiobolaceae, Completoriaceae, Entomophthoraceae, Meristacraceae, and Neozygitaceae), it contains over 250 species that are mostly arthropod pathogens or soil- and litter-borne saprobes.

== Taxonomy ==
Circumscribed by mycologist Richard Humber in 2012, it contains species formerly classified in the division Zygomycota. Humber's reorganization divides the division into three classes while retaining the previously defined family structure:

Division Entomophthoromycota Humber 2012 [Entomophthoromycotina Humber 2007]

Class Neozygitomycetes Humber 2012

Order Neozygitales Humber 2012

Family Neozygitaceae Ben Ze’ev, Kenneth & Uziel 1987

Apterivorax Keller 2005
Neozygites Witlaczil 1885 [Thaxterosporium Ben Ze'ev & Kenneth 1987]

Class Entomophthoromycetes Humber 2012 [Entomomycetidae Cavalier-Smith 1998 em. 2012]

Order Entomophthorales Winter 1880 [Ancylistales Schröter]

Family Ancylistaceae Schröter 1893

Ancyclistes Pfitzer 1872
Conidiobolus Brefeld 1884 emend. Humber 1989 [Conidiobolus (Capillidium) Ben-Ze’ev & Kenneth 1982; Conidiobolus (Conidiobolus) (Brefeld) Ben-Ze’ev & Kenneth 1982; Conidiobolus (Delacroixia) (Sacc. & Syd.) Tyrrell & MacLeod 1972]
Macrobiotophthora Reukauf 1912 emend. Tucker 1981

Family Completoriaceae Humber 1989

Completoria Lohde 1874

Family Entomophthoraceae Nowakowski 1877 [Empusaceaae]

Subfamily Erynioideae Keller 2005 [Massosporoideae Keller 2005]

Erynia (Nowakowski ex Batko 1966) Remaud. & Hennebert 1980.emend. Humber 1989 [Zoophthora (Erynia) Nowakowski ex Batko 1966]
Eryniopsis Humber 1984 (in part)
Furia (Batko 1966) Humber 2005 [Zoophthora (Furia) Batko 1966; Erynia (Furia) (Batko 1966) Li & Humber 1984]
Orthomyces Steinkraus, Humber & Oliver 1988
Pandora Humber 2005 [Erynia (Neopandora) Ben-Ze’ev & Kenneth 1982]
Strongwellsea Batko & Weiser 1965 emend. Humber 1976
Zoophthora Batko 1964 emend. Ben-Ze’ev & Kenneth 2005

Subfamily Entomophthoroideae Keller 2005

Batkoa Humber 2005
Entomophaga Batko 1964 emend. Humber 1989
Entomophthora Fresenius 1856 [Empusa (Triplosporium) Thaxter 1888; Triplosporium (Thaxter 1888) Batko 1964]
Eryniopsis Humber 1984 (in part)
Massospora Peck 1879 emend. Soper 1974

Family Meristacraceae Humber 1989

Meristacrum Drechsler 1940 emend. Tucker & Humber 1981 (syn Tabanomyces Couch et al.)

Genera that have an uncertain status or have been excluded from the Entomophthoromycota include Ballocephala, Tarichium, and Zygnemomyces.
Synonyms from "Part 1- Virae, Prokarya, Protists, Fungi". Ballocephala and Zygnemomyces were transferred to Mucoromycota division.

Basidiobolomycetes was transferred to Basidiobolomycota.

== Description ==
Species in the Entomophthoromycota generally share several characteristics. Their vegetative cells are coenocytic; sporulation occurs by production of forcibly discharged dispersive or infective conidia; and their zygospores (which also function as resting spores) are homothallic.
