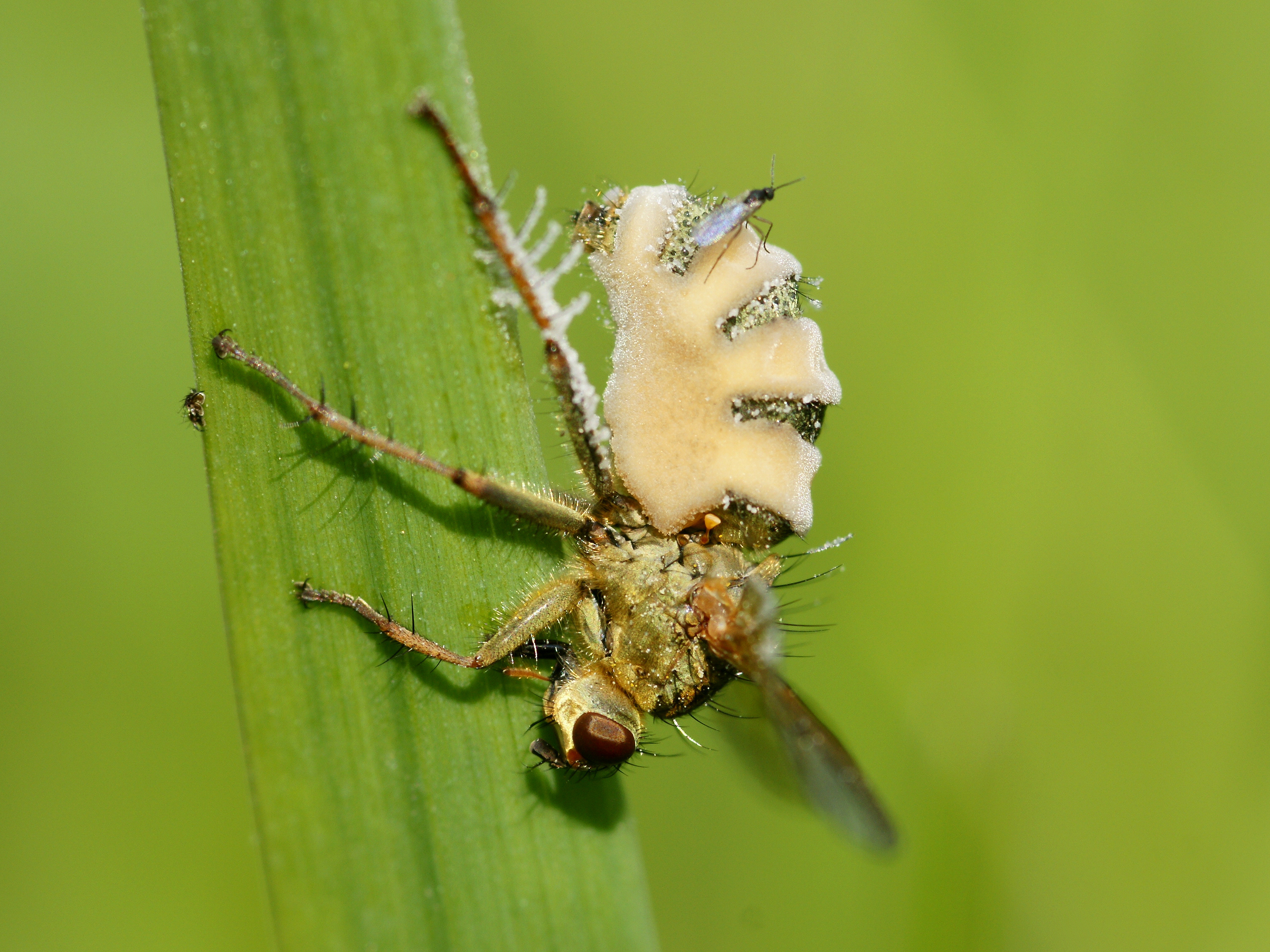
- Entomophthora muscae

Scientific classification
- Kingdom: Fungi
- Division: Entomophthoromycota
- Class: Entomophthoromycetes; Humber
- Order: Entomophthorales; Winter

Families
- Ancylistaceae; Completoriaceae; Entomophthoraceae; Meristacraceae; Neozygitaceae

Synonyms
- Ancylistales Vines 1888 ex Schröter 1893; Ancylistineae Schröter 1893

= Entomophthorales =

Order of fungi

The Entomophthorales are an order of fungi that were previously classified in the class Zygomycetes. A new subdivision, Entomophthoromycotina, in 2007, was circumscribed for them.

Most species of the entomophthorales are pathogens of insects. A few attack nematodes, mites, and tardigrades, and some (particularly species of the genus Conidiobolus) are free-living saprotrophs.

The name "entomophthorales" is derived from the Ancient Greek for insect destroyer (entomo- = referring to insects, and phthor = "destruction"). Named after genus Entomophthora in 1856.

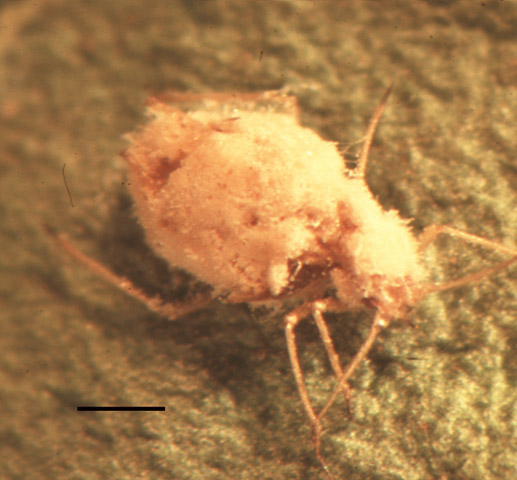
Green peach aphid, Myzus persicae, killed by the fungus Pandora neoaphidis (Zygomycota: Entomophthorales) Scale bar = 0.3 mm.

== Highlighted species ==
- Conidiobolus coronatus, a saprotrophic fungus of leaf litter and a mammal pathogen
- Entomophaga maimaiga, a biocontrol agent of spongy moths
- Entomophthora muscae, a pathogen of houseflies
- Massospora spp., pathogens of periodical cicadas
- Pandora, including Pandora neoaphidis, an obligate pathogen of aphids

== Biology ==
Most species of the entomophthorales produce ballistic asexual spores that are forcibly discharged. When not landing on a suitable host, these spores can germinate to make one of several alternate spore forms, including a smaller version of the original spore, or (in some species) an adhesive spore elevated on a very slender conidiophore called a capilliconidiophore.

== Classification ==
Debates have centred on whether the Basidiobolaceae should be included in the entomophthorales, or raised to ordinal status. Molecular systematics approaches so far give an ambiguous answer. Some analyses suggest the Basidiobolaceae are more closely related to certain chytrid fungi than to the entomophthorales. and place it within the Chytridiales order. Others find weak support to maintain them in the Entomophthorales. Morphological characters can be found to support either hypothesis.

- Family Ancylistaceae Schröter 1893
  - Ancyclistes Pfitzer 1872
  - Capillidium B. Huang & Y. Nie, 2020
  - Conidiobolus Brefeld 1884 emend. Humber 1989 [Conidiobolus (Conidiobolus) (Brefeld) Ben-Ze'ev & Kenneth 1982; Conidiobolus (Delacroixia) (Sacc. & Syd.) Tyrrell & MacLeod 1972]
  - Macrobiotophthora Reukauf 1912 emend. Tucker 1981
- Family Completoriaceae Humber 1989
  - Completoria Lohde 1874
- Family Entomophthoraceae Nowakowski 1877 [Empusaceae Clem. & Shear 1931]
  - Subfamily Erynioideae Keller 2005 [Massosporoideae Keller 2005]
    - Erynia (Nowakowski ex Batko 1966) Remaud. & Hennebert 1980.emend. Humber 1989 [Zoophthora (Erynia) Nowakowski ex Batko 1966]
    - Eryniopsis Humber 1984 (in part)
    - Furia (Batko 1966) Humber 2005 [Zoophthora (Furia) Batko 1966; Erynia (Furia) (Batko 1966) Li & Humber 1984]
    - Orthomyces Steinkraus, Humber & Oliver 1988
    - Pandora Humber 2005 [Erynia (Neopandora) Ben-Ze'ev & Kenneth 1982]
    - Strongwellsea Batko & Weiser 1965 emend. Humber 1976
    - Tarichium Cohn (1875)
    - Zoophthora Batko 1964 emend. Ben-Ze'ev & Kenneth 2005
  - Subfamily Entomophthoroideae Keller 2005
    - Batkoa Humber 2005
    - Entomophaga Batko 1964 emend. Humber 1989
    - Entomophthora Fresenius 1856 [Empusa (Triplosporium) Thaxter 1888]
    - Eryniopsis Humber 1984 (in part)
    - Massospora Peck 1879 emend. Soper 1974
- Family Meristacraceae Humber 1989
  - Meristacrum Drechsler 1940 emend. Tucker & Humber 1981
- Family Neozygitaceae Ben Ze'ev, R.G. Kenneth & Uziel 1987

- Apterivorax S.Keller 2005
- Neozygites Witlaczil 1885
