= Donus =

Donus may refer to:

- Donus (beetle), a genus of beetles in the tribe Hyperini
- Pope Donus (died 678)
