= Fronto (beetle) =

Scientific classification
- Kingdom: Animalia
- Phylum: Arthropoda
- Class: Insecta
- Order: Coleoptera
- Suborder: Polyphaga
- Infraorder: Cucujiformia
- Family: Curculionidae
- Subfamily: Hyperinae
- Tribe: Hyperini
- Genus: Fronto; Petri, 1901

Species
- Fronto bimaculatus Petri, 1901; Fronto capiomonti (Faust, 1882)

Genus of beetles

Fronto is a genus of true weevils in the tribe Hyperini.
