= Brachypera zoilus =

Scientific classification
- Kingdom: Animalia
- Phylum: Arthropoda
- Clade: Pancrustacea
- Class: Insecta
- Order: Coleoptera
- Suborder: Polyphaga
- Infraorder: Cucujiformia
- Superfamily: Curculionoidea
- Family: Curculionidae
- Genus: Brachypera
- Species: B. zoilus

Binomial name
- Brachypera zoilus (Scopoli, J.A., 1763)

Synonyms
- List: Curculio zoilus Scopoli, J.A., 1763; Donus zoilus (Scopoli, 1763); Hypera zoilus (Scopoli, 1763); Brachyrhinus punctatus (Fabricius, J.C., 1775); Curculio punctatus Fabricius, J.C., 1775; Hypera punctata (Fabricius, J.C., 1775); Phytonomus punctatus (Fabricius, 1775); Rhynchaenus punctatus (Fabricius, J.C., 1775); Hypera hostilis Dejean, P.F.M.A., 1821; Curculio anstriacus Burrell, J., 1810; Curculio medius Marsham, T., 1802; Rhynchaenus medius (Marsham, T., 1802); Curculio zoïlus Olivier, A.G., 1791; Curculio linzensis Gmelin, J.F., 1790; Curculio pictus Fourcroy, 1785; Curculio pictus Geoffroy, E.L., 1785; Curculio austriacus Schrank, F.P., 1781; Hypera austriaca (Schrank, F.P., 1781); Rhynchaenus austriacus (Schrank, F.P., 1781)

Species of weevil

Brachypera zoilus, commonly known as the clover leaf weevil, is a species of weevil in the beetle family Curculionidae. B. zoilus is often confused with the alfalfa weevil due to their similar appearance and host plants, but unlike alfalfa weevils, B.zoilus rarely causes economical damage crops and grows to approximately two times larger.

B. zoilus is especially vulnerable to the fungal pathogen Zoophthora phytonomi; most of their population are killed by it during spring, partially contributing to their non-threat to commercial crops.

== Description ==
Dorsal view, the elytra displaying uniform vertical stripes of alternating light and dark brown, black dots, and lack of non-vertical white bands.

Like other members of this genus, Brachypera zoilus feeds on foliage of the legume family, including clovers, giving them their common name. It prefers cool and dry weather, possibly because humid weather promote fungal pathogen growth their larvae are especially susceptible to.

Distinguishing characteristics of the B. zoilus adult includes the size, growing to 5 to 10 mm (0.20 to 0.39 in) in length, and the uniform verticle stripes on the elytra. B. zoilus larvae can be distinguished from its lookalike alfalfa weevil by the presence of a brown head instead of a black head.

To distinguish B. zoilus adults from others of this genus, it is often observed B. zoilus has elytra with uniform vertical pin depressions, alternation of light and dark brown vertical stripes, presence of pronounced black dots, and lack of non-vertical white bands.

== Taxonomy ==
Brachypera zoilus was re-categorized from Hypera or Donus into genus Brachypera as of 2008, the distinguishing characteristic being the number of teeth on the larval mandibles. Specifically, Brachypera has 4, Donus has 3, and Hypera has 2.

== Distribution ==
Brachypera zoilus, like other species in the genus Brachypera, is native to the Palearctic region. Its presence in North America was first reported in 1881, and first collected as a specimen in 1902. The theorized mode of introduction is introduction through straw packing materials.

== Relationship with fungal pathogen ==
In North America, B. zoilus has long been heavily pathogenized by the fungus Zoophthora phytonomi, almost a century before it was first found on alfalfa weevils. It is believed to have been introduced to North America along with B. zoilus from Eurasian areas.
