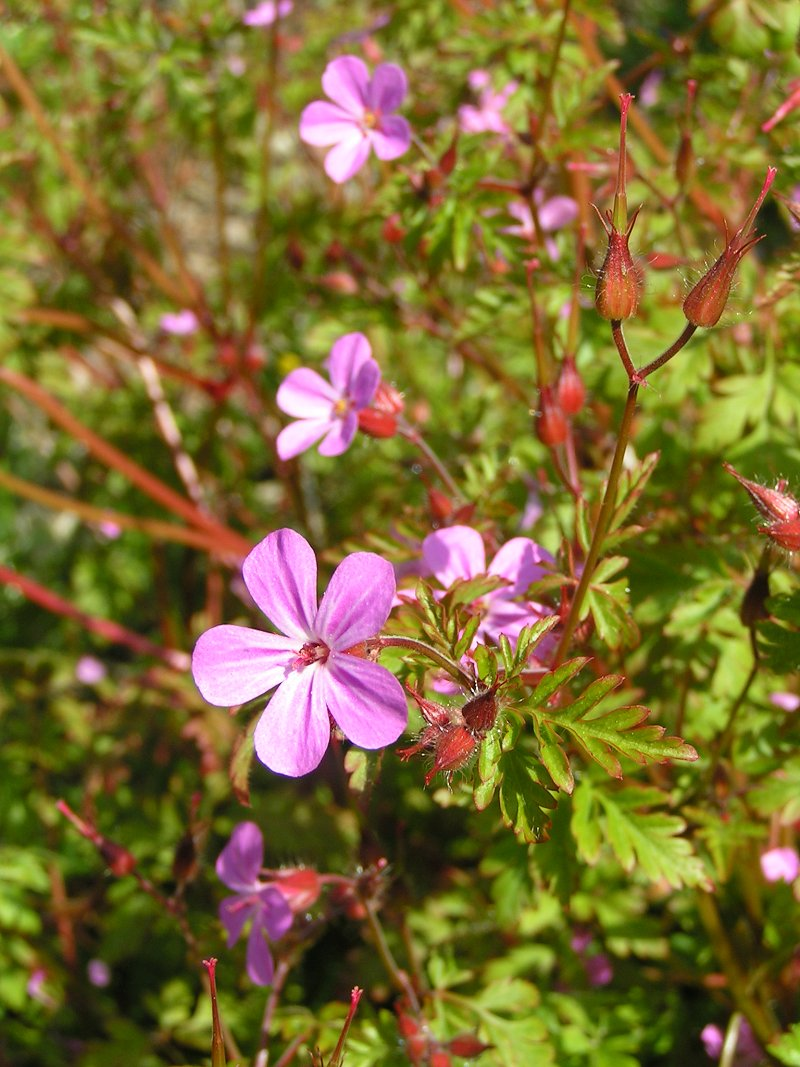

Scientific classification
- Kingdom: Plantae
- Clade: Embryophytes
- Clade: Tracheophytes
- Clade: Angiosperms
- Clade: Eudicots
- Clade: Rosids
- Order: Geraniales
- Family: Geraniaceae
- Genus: Geranium
- Species: G. robertianum

Binomial name
- Geranium robertianum L.

Synonyms
- Robertiella robertiana

= Geranium robertianum =

Species of flowering plant

Geranium robertianum, commonly known as herb-robert or, in North America, as Robert's geranium, is a species of cranesbill that is widespread throughout the northern hemisphere and introduced to some countries in the southern. It is common in woods, hedges, gardens, and on waste ground, and can also be found on shingle beaches and limestone pavements. It is not rare or threatened and in some places it is considered to be invasive.

== Description ==
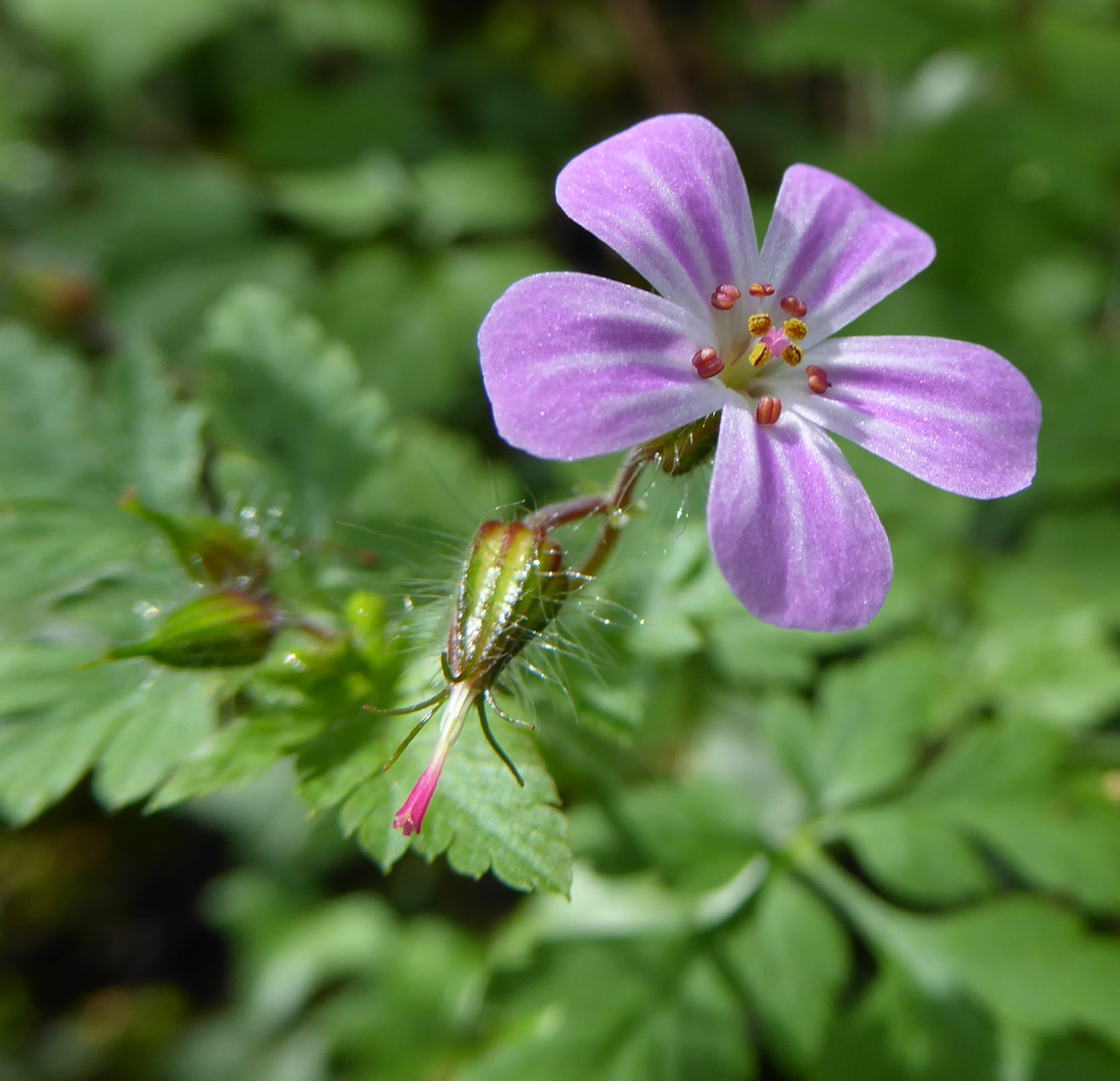
The flower has ten stamens in two rings of five; the inner anthers open first.

Herb-robert is a small, usually biennial but sometimes annual or even short-lived perennial herb that typically grows to about 30 cm (1 ft) tall and broad, or sometimes up to about twice that size. Young plants have a very short vegetative stem with effectively a basal rosette of leaves on petioles 2–5 cm (0.79–1.97 in) long, while older plants put up flowering stems from the axils of one or more of these basal leaves. The flowering stems can arise vertically or sprawl along the ground, and some of them can turn into stolons by putting down roots at the nodes. The whole plant is variously hairy, with a mixture of long simple hairs and shorter gland-tipped ones. Fresh material has what is often described as a "strong, unpleasant" odour when bruised or uprooted (even to the extent that it is sometimes given the nickname "stinky Bob"), but this property fades with time. Its colour can vary from entirely green, to reddish at the nodes or on the stems or leaves, or the whole plant (except the petals) can be bright red, especially when growing in bright sunshine.

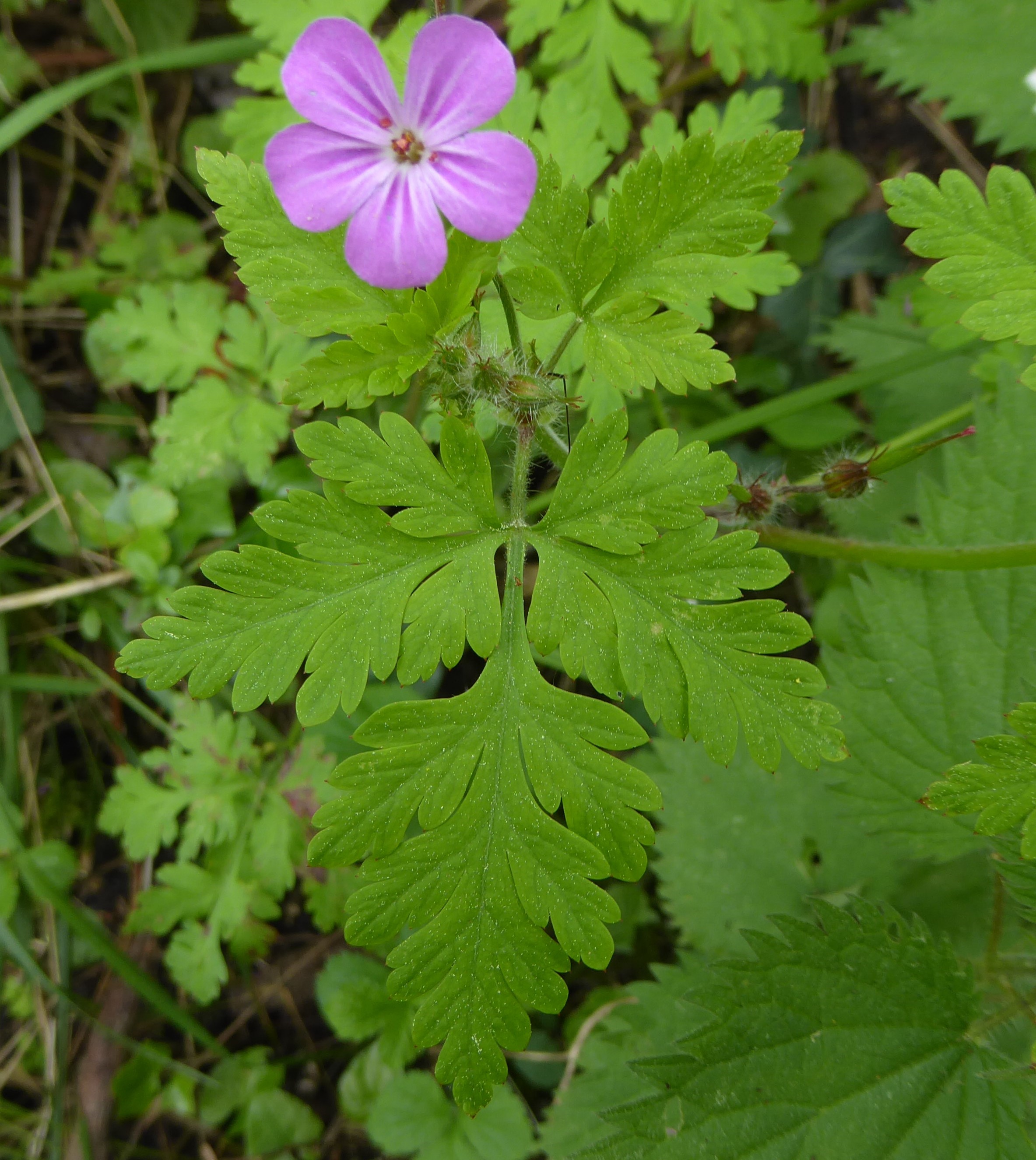
The leaves are typically ternate (as here) or palmate.

The leaves are arranged alternately along the stems, and are typically divided into three stalked lobes, the lower two of which are further split to produce a 5-lobed (palmate) outline, up to about 11 cm (4.3 in) in diameter in the largest, lower leaves. The leaflets are deeply lobed and toothed, with a short mucronate tip on each lobe.

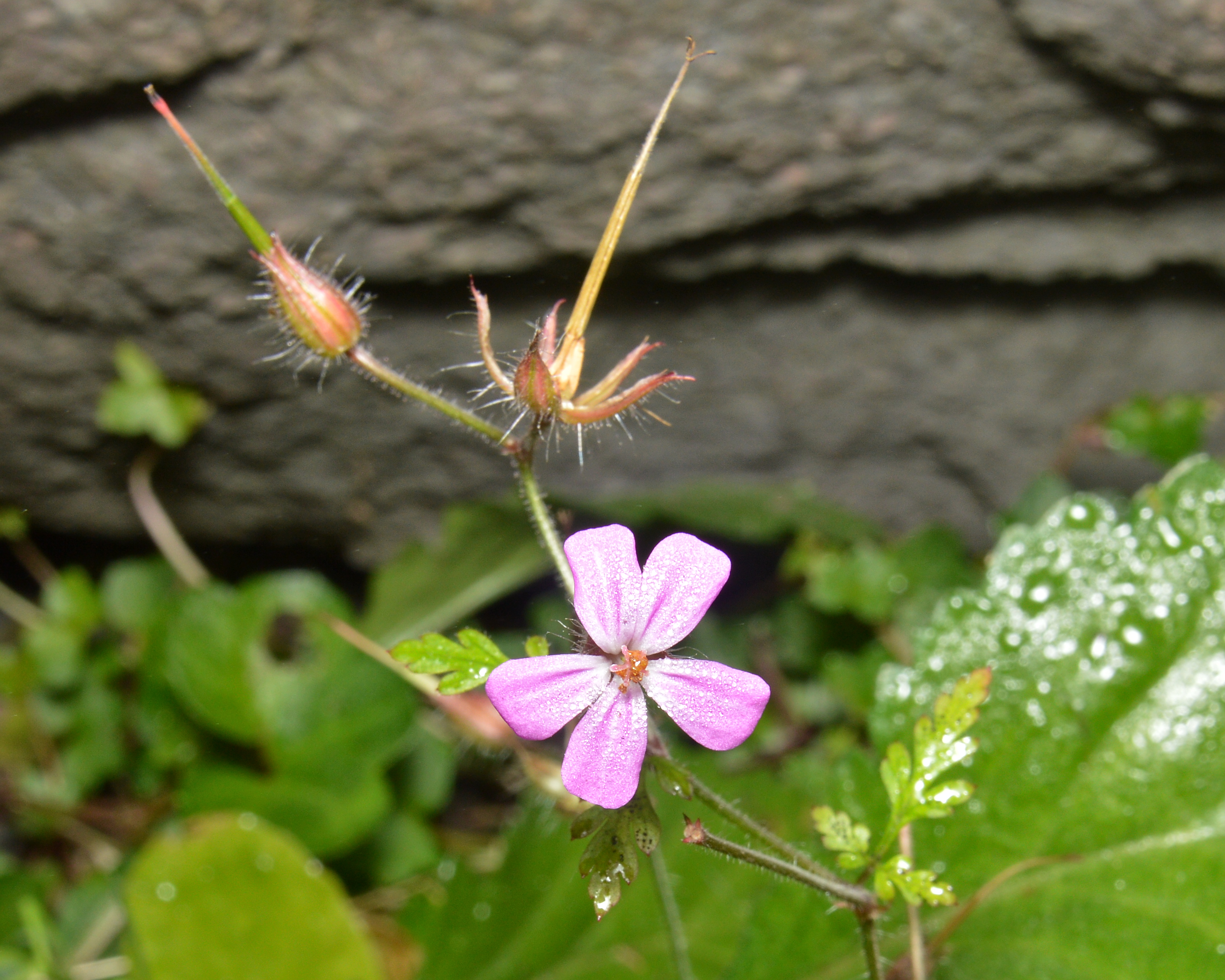
A ripe fruit and a discharged fruit, showing the remains of the elongated style

Flowering occurs from early spring to late autumn in northern Europe and plants remain green over winter. The inflorescence is on a long peduncle, which arises opposite a leaf on the flowering stem, and consists of a pair of bisexual pink flowers, 12–16 mm in diameter, on short (1 cm) pedicels. Often one of the two flowers in a pair will be abortive. The five sepals are about 5 mm long, lanceolate and coated with both pink-tipped glandular and eglandular hairs. The petals are from 8 to 14 mm long, purplish-pink with white stripes, and with the claw (stalk-like basal part) slightly shorter than the limb. There is no notch in the top of the petals, unlike in some other geraniums. There are 10 stamens in two rings of 5 that project slightly beyond the flower, with purple anthers and yellow pollen; the inner ring of anthers opens first. The female part of the flower consists of 5 carpels with one style, which is divided into 5 pink stigmas at the top. These are already spread when the flower opens, which facilitates self-pollination, although cross-pollination also occurs.

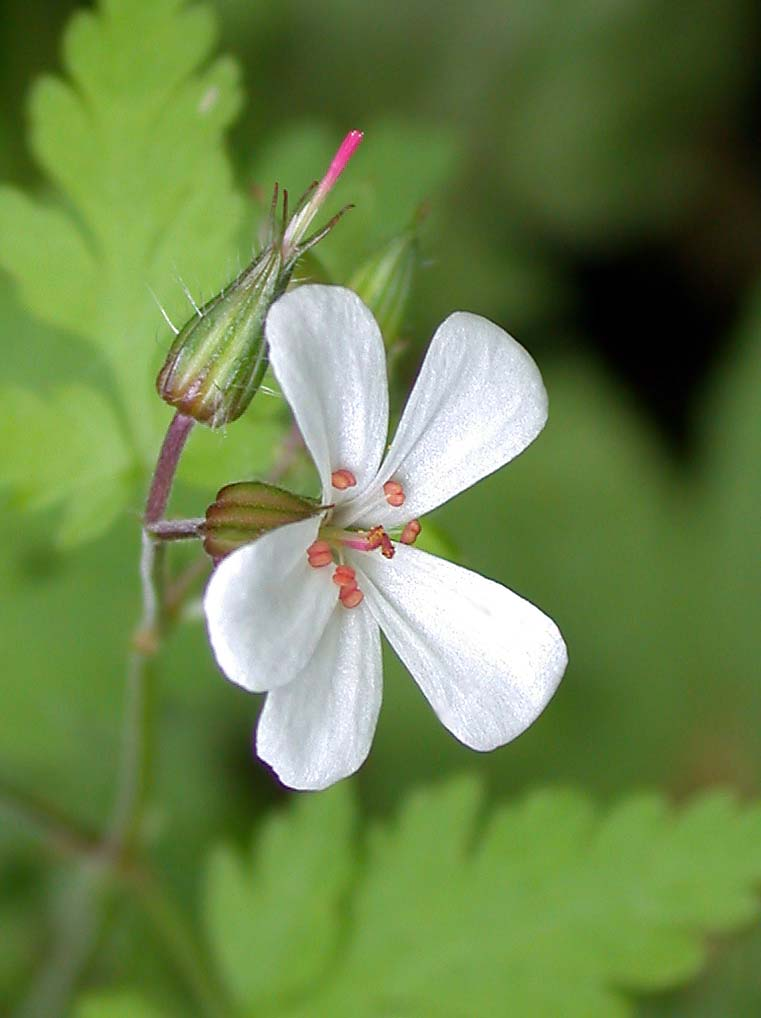
The white-flowered form, sometimes called var. alba, is quite common.

The fruit is a schizocarp, which splits into 5 cylindrical, 2.5 mm long, mericarps on maturity. These are situated at the base of the style, the base of which (the column) elongates to about 1.5 cm as the fruit develops. Connecting the tip of the style to the mericarp is a strip of material called an awn. When the fruit is ripe, the awn curls upwards explosively from the base, ejecting the fruits a distance of a metre of so from the parent plant.

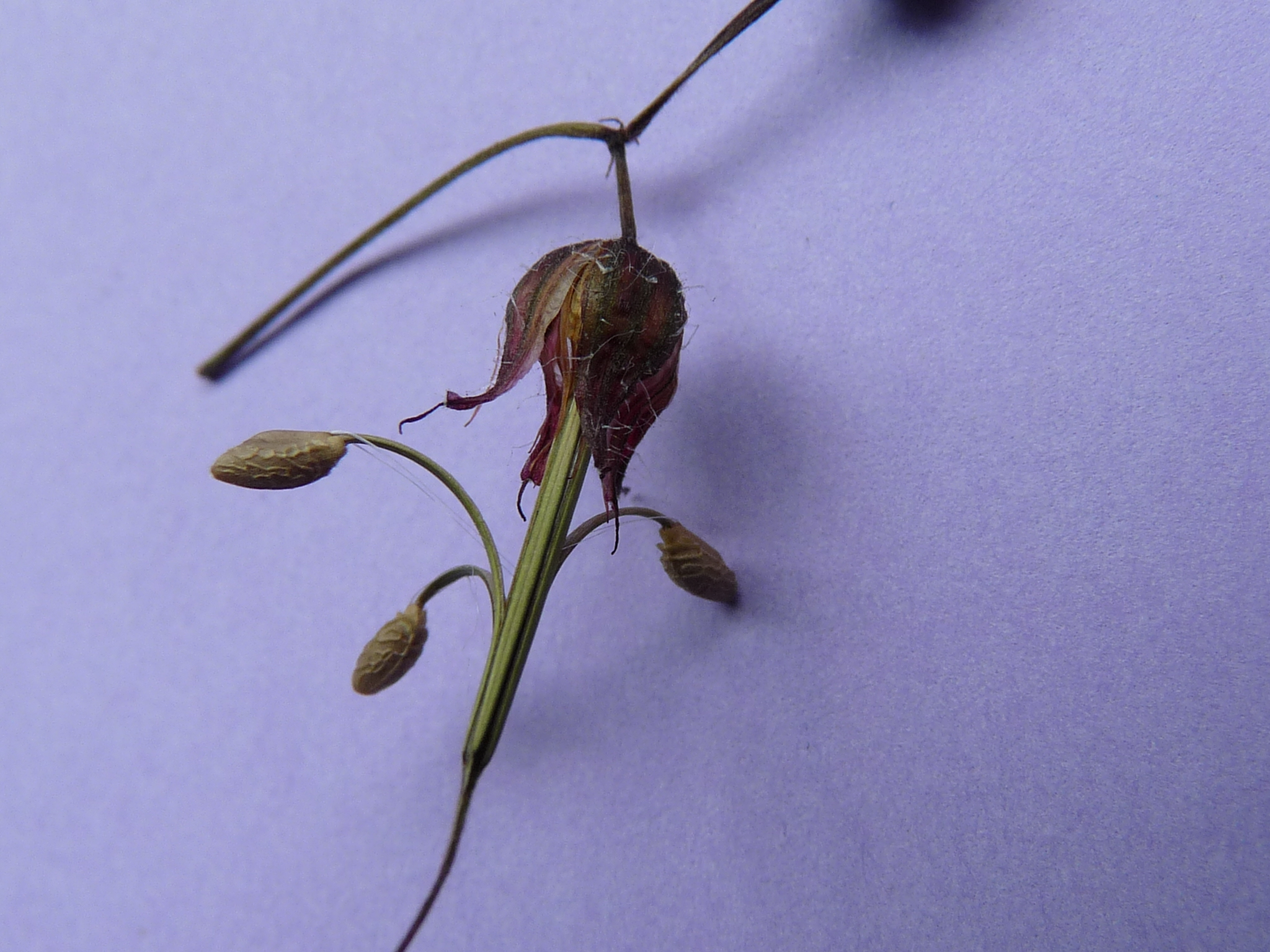
A fruit undergoing dehiscence.

== Identification ==
Other cranesbills that look rather similar include shining cranesbill, which has lobed but undivided leaves, and long-stalked cranesbill, which has long points on the sepals. It is very similar in appearance to little robin but that species has smaller flowers (5–9 mm), yellow anthers, and no smell.

In Britain, in particular, it can be very difficult to separate herb-robert from little robin in coastal locations; various varieties and hybrids have been described. Key features to look out for include the ridges on the ripe mericarps (less pronounced than in little robin), the petals being twice as long as the sepals (just slightly longer in little robin), the hairiness of the leaves (glabrous in little robin). The petals of little robin are always purple and do not have white stripes.

== Taxonomy ==
The scientific name was assigned by Linnaeus in Species Plantarum (1753), and it has not changed since then; but it was not original. Linnaeus cites Bauhin as having used the polynomial Geranium robertianum primum it in his Pinax theatri botanici in 1623. Bauhin, in turn, credited it to Dodoens, who listed Geranium robertianum in his Stirpium historiae in 1554. But Dodoens got the name from Ruellius who published De natura stirpium ("On the nature of species") in 1543, which was largely a translation of Dioscorides's De materia medica. In this, there is just one type of "geranion", which is described as having heads like a crane's "horn", and may have been what we now call a geranium. The name Robertiana herba may therefore have first been used by Ruellius, as it is not in Dioscorides.

The generic name comes from the Ancient Greek word for the plant, γεράνιον (géranion), which comes from γέρανος (géranos) 'crane' with the diminutive ending -ιον, "little crane". This was also used by the Romans. It refers to the beak-like shape of the style in fruit.

There are many synonyms, most of them having arisen as descriptions of varieties or subspecies. These are not widely accepted now. A full list is given in Plants of the World Online. Some experts, however, do still recognise various forms. Sell & Murrell, for example, describe three subspecies in Britain:

- subsp. celticum Ostenf., a green-coloured annual with pale flowers, found on limestone in the west;
- subsp. maritimum (Bab.) H.G. Baker, a prostrate red biennial with dark flowers, found on shingle beaches;
- subsp. robertianum, the common form found inland.

Geranium robertianum has generally been found to have a chromosome number of 2n = 64, although there has been a count of 2n = 32. The closely related Geranium purpureum has a chromosome number 2n = 32, and there has been speculation that this species may be an ancestor of herb-robert. The two species have been found to hybridise on beaches in south-west Britain and Ireland to produce largely infertile offspring with a chromosome number 2n = 48. This hybrid has not been recorded elsewhere in Europe.

== Distribution and status ==
The main areas of distribution of herb-robert are throughout Europe northwards to the Baltic and eastwards as far as Russia. It also occurs in north Africa and it is considered also to be native in north America, although in some western states it is regarded as a weed.

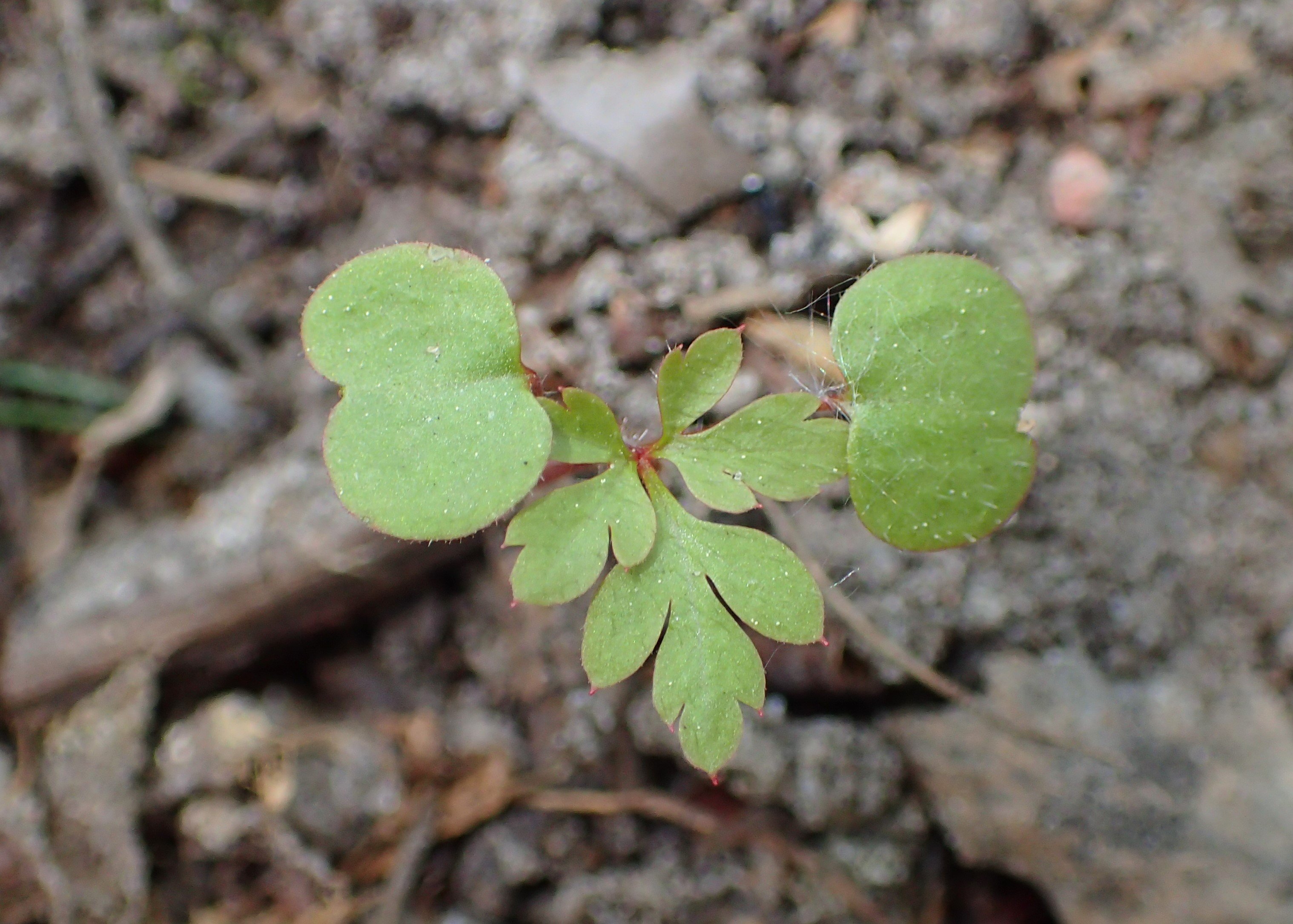
The seed leaves have a distinctive shape.

It grows at altitudes from sea level to 700 m (2,300 ft) at Great Dun Fell in England and up to 2,400 m (7,900 ft) in Kashmir.

The IUCN has not assessed the threat status of this species, but in some countries it is classified as Least Concern.

== Habitat and ecology ==
Its Ellenberg values in Britain are L=5, N=6, F=6, R=6 and S=0, which means that it typically grows in places with light shade, moist neutral soils with moderate fertility and no salinity. However, it can occupy a wide range of habitats, including shingle beaches in full sun and grikes in limestone pavements. Despite these neutral-sounding values, it is primarily a plant of woodland, and it is quite tolerant of at least moderate shade. It is also much more of a calcicole than a calcifuge, being most common in limestone and chalk woodlands, and absent from many acid habitats. The most typical vegetation communities for it in Britain include ash woods and hawthorn hedges.

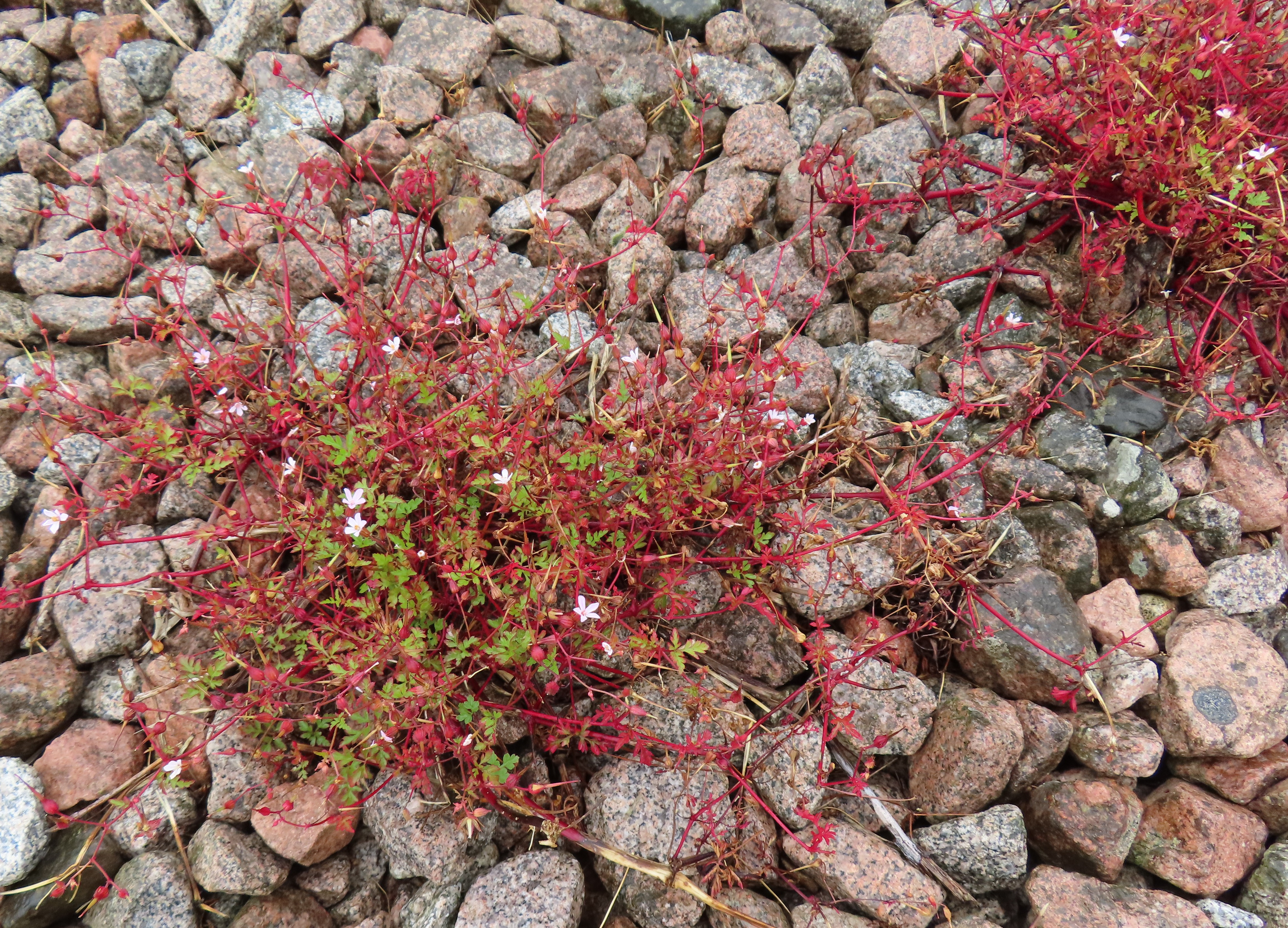
The coastal subspecies often has distinct red colouration.

In Europe there are 52 habitats in which it is found. In two of these it is a diagnostic species. Under the EUNIS habitat system these are: T1-F Forêts de ravin (ravine forests) and T1-G Aulnaies à Alnus cordata (Italian alder carr). It is also considered characteristic of E5.43 shady forest edges, F3.11 Central European thickets on moist soils, H2.6C Illyrian sub-Mediterranean screes, and G1.7A1212 Pannonic alkali steppe oak woods. A re-evaluation of its ecological attributes in Switzerland assigned it the following Ellenberg Values: L=3, N=4, F=3, R=6, T=3+ and K=3.

The British database of insects and foodplants lists nine species which are phytophagous on herb-robert. Most feed on the leaves: the beetle Aphthona nigriceps, the meadow cranesbill weevil Zacladus geranii, the larvae of the weevil Limobius borealis, the bugs Dicyphus errans and Rhopalus subrufus, and the aphid Acyrthosiphon malvae. Of the others, the beetle Byturus ochraceus eats the pollen; the bloody cranesbill weevil Zacladus exiguus eats the roots; and the larvae of the sawfly Ametastegia (Protoemphytus) carpini mine the leaves. In Europe there are many more species of insect associated with it.

== Uses and in culture ==
White-flowered varieties of herb-robert have been cultivated in gardens for centuries. A small-flowered, fragrant white variety, 'Celtic White', is currently a popular garden plant.

Folk etymology provides several possible origins of the name of herb-robert. Some claim it is from St Rupert, who is also known as Saint Robert, because a German name for it is ruprechtskraut (another, more prosaic one is Stinkender Storchschnabel). Alternatively, a link to Saint Robert of Molesme has been proposed. Another explanation is that it could be derived from Robin Goodfellow, a hobgoblin in northern European mythology. In Britain there are dozens of other country names for herb-robert, some of which ("robin-in-the-hedge", "robin's-flower") make reference to the European robin because of the colour and the habitat.

The medicinal value of herb-robert is uncertain. Maud Grieve, for example, did not mention it at all in her influential herbal, but there are other accounts of it being used in the folk medicine of several countries, including as a treatment for diarrhea, to improve functioning of the liver and gallbladder, for toothache and nosebleeds, and as a vulnerary (used for or useful in healing wounds). Freshly picked leaves, when rubbed on the body, are said to repel mosquitoes.

Chemical constituents include tannins, a bitter compound called geraniin, and essential oils. Some researchers have reported potentially useful medicinal properties in plant extracts.
