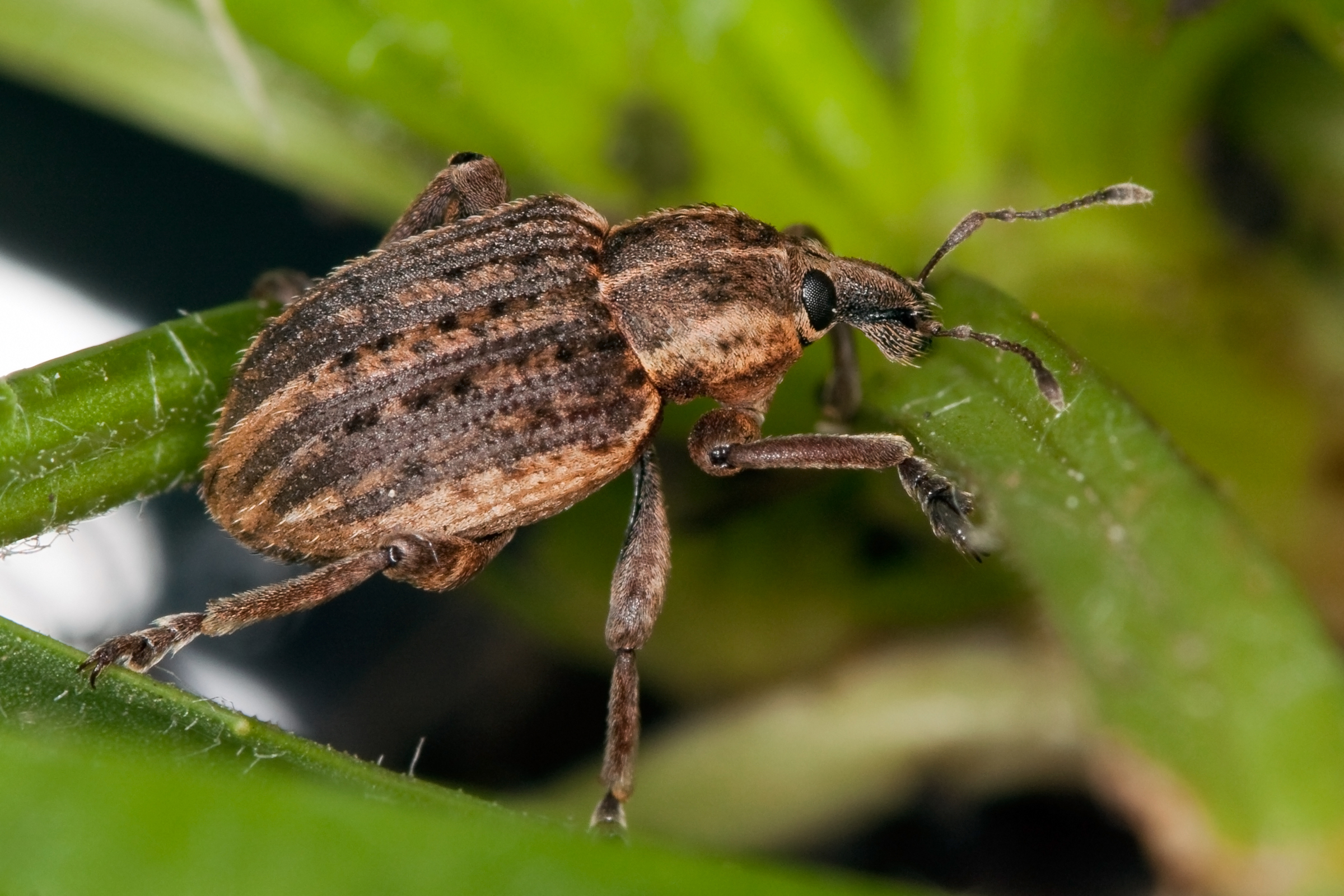
- Brachypera zoilus

Scientific classification
- Kingdom: Animalia
- Phylum: Arthropoda
- Clade: Pancrustacea
- Class: Insecta
- Order: Coleoptera
- Suborder: Polyphaga
- Infraorder: Cucujiformia
- Superfamily: Curculionoidea
- Family: Curculionidae
- Subfamily: Hyperinae
- Genus: Brachypera; Capiomont, G., 1868

= Brachypera =

Genus of weevil

Brachypera is a genus of weevils in the beetle family Curculionidae. There are more than 40 Palearctic described species; one of which, Brachypera zoilus, has been introduced to North America.

== Description ==
Brachypera feed on the foliage of various legume and buckwheat families, including clovers. Their snout (rostrum) are short for true weevils, which is reasonable for their diet of soft leaves. Their elytra have vertical stripes of light and dark brown; the pattern on which is somewhat reliable for differentiating between species of members within Brachypera, such as black spots for B. zoilus and white cresents for B. lunata.

Members of Brachypera are often confused with those of Donus and Hypera, due to their similar appearance and host plants. In fact, species of these genuses have been re-categorized into each other. To distinguish Brachypera from its similar genuses, Brachypera has 4 teeth on the larval mandibles.

== Species ==
The following species are assigned to this genus:

- Brachypera amalek Skuhrovec, 2008
- Brachypera apfelbecki Skuhrovec, 2008
- Brachypera audax Skuhrovec, 2008
- Brachypera brevirostris Skuhrovec, 2008
- Brachypera chevrolati Skuhrovec, 2008
- Brachypera corrosa Skuhrovec, 2008
- Brachypera crinita Skuhrovec, 2008
- Brachypera dauci (Olivier, A.G., 1807)
- Brachypera deyrollei Skuhrovec, 2008
- Brachypera fallax Skuhrovec, 2008
- Brachypera fausti Skuhrovec, 2008
- Brachypera freyi Skuhrovec, 2012
- Brachypera gracilirostris Skuhrovec, 2008
- Brachypera grandini Skuhrovec, 2008
- Brachypera hierichontica Skuhrovec, 2008
- Brachypera hispanica (Capiomont, 1868)
- Brachypera hispidula Skuhrovec, 2008
- Brachypera horvathi Skuhrovec, 2008
- Brachypera isabellina Skuhrovec, 2008
- Brachypera judaica Skuhrovec, 2008
- Brachypera leprieuri Skuhrovec, 2008
- Brachypera lhostei Skuhrovec, 2008
- Brachypera libanica Skuhrovec, 2008
- Brachypera lukjanovitschi Skuhrovec, 2008
- Brachypera lunata Skuhrovec, 2008
- Brachypera marmottani Skuhrovec, 2008
- Brachypera multifida Skuhrovec, 2008
- Brachypera parvithorax Skuhrovec, 2008
- Brachypera perplexa Skuhrovec, 2008
- Brachypera proxima Skuhrovec, 2008
- Brachypera reichei Skuhrovec, 2008
- Brachypera reitteri Skuhrovec, 2008
- Brachypera rufimembris Skuhrovec, 2008
- Brachypera saulcyi Skuhrovec, 2008
- Brachypera scapularis Skuhrovec, 2008
- Brachypera sinuaticollis Skuhrovec, 2008
- Brachypera solarii (Roudier, 1959)
- Brachypera subfasciculata Skuhrovec, 2008
- Brachypera subsulcata Skuhrovec, 2008
- Brachypera taurica Skuhrovec, 2008
- Brachypera theresae Skuhrovec, 2008
- Brachypera tumida Skuhrovec, 2008
- Brachypera vidua Skuhrovec, 2008
- Brachypera zoilus (Scopoli, J.A., 1763)
