= Coniatus elegans =

Scientific classification
- Kingdom: Animalia
- Phylum: Arthropoda
- Class: Insecta
- Order: Coleoptera
- Suborder: Polyphaga
- Infraorder: Cucujiformia
- Family: Curculionidae
- Genus: Coniatus
- Species: C. elegans

Binomial name
- Coniatus elegans Cap., 1868

Species of beetle

Coniatus elegans is a species of true weevils in the subfamily Hyperinae. It is found in Syria.
