= Zoophthora phytonomi =

Scientific classification
- Kingdom: Fungi
- Division: Entomophthoromycota
- Class: Entomophthoromycetes
- Order: Entomophthorales
- Family: Entomophthoraceae
- Genus: Zoophthora
- Species: Z. phytonomi

Binomial name
- Zoophthora phytonomi (Arthur) A. Batko

Synonyms
- Entomophthora phytonomi Arthur; Erynia phytonomi (Arthur) Humber, Ben Ze'ev & R.G. Kenneth

Species of fungus

Zoophthora phytonomi is an entomogenous fungal pathogen that preys on several species of insects. It acts as a natural population control for some insects and as a potential biopesticide for others.

== Taxonomy ==
Zoophthora phytonomi has been long known as Entomophthora sphaerosperma, which was also known as Entomophthora phytonomi. It has been re-categorized into genus Zoophthora as of 1964, likely because fungi of genus Entomophthora pathogenizes exclusively flies and other dipterans.

== Mechanism of growth and spread ==
=== In the wild ===
Zoophthora phytonomi has been found on the larvae of beetles and moths, lethal to some and nontoxic to others. Humid and warm weather encourages the growth of Z. phytonomi. The larvae often undergoes a color change before dying.

Once introduced, the mycellia of Z. phytonomi spreads inside the larval body, absorbing the larva's nutrients and liquids. Some of the mycellia branches out to the surface of the insect and form a coating, then branches into spores that are projected into the air to land on other larvae for propagation.

=== In the laboratory ===
Despite Z. phytonomi being exclusively found on insects in nature, it has been successfully grown on many other mediums, such as the flesh of various fish and potatoes. Growth stages of these laboratory samples has been compared to and confirmed to be identical with the growth stages of wild Z. phytonomi.

== Hosts ==
=== Clover leaf weevil ===
Zoophthora phytonomi heavily pathogenizes the clover leaf weevil, limiting its population to non-disruptive numbers. This effective population control is likely the reason clover leaf weevils are not considered crop pests, despite its ability to use crop plants as a host.

=== Alfalfa weevil ===
In North America, Z. phytonomi was first found on the alfalfa weevil almost a century (1973) after the clover leaf weevil (which carried the pathogen) was first introduced to the United States. It is being researched as a biopesticide. If the larva is infected, it turns brown before dying.
