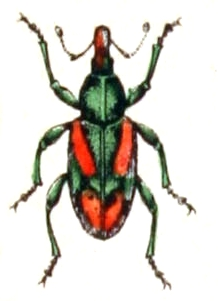
- Coniatus tamarisci, from Calwer's Käferbuch, Table 32, Picture 5.

Scientific classification
- Kingdom: Animalia
- Phylum: Arthropoda
- Class: Insecta
- Order: Coleoptera
- Suborder: Polyphaga
- Infraorder: Cucujiformia
- Family: Curculionidae
- Tribe: Hyperini
- Genus: Coniatus; Germar, 1817

Species
- Several, including: Coniatus elegans; Coniatus tamarisci

= Coniatus =

Genus of beetles

Coniatus is a genus of true weevils in the subfamily Hyperinae. Species have a palaearctic distribution in Eurasia, Africa and America. There are also fossil species known from the Cenozoic.
