= Donus elegans =

Scientific classification
- Kingdom: Animalia
- Phylum: Arthropoda
- Class: Insecta
- Order: Coleoptera
- Suborder: Polyphaga
- Infraorder: Cucujiformia
- Family: Curculionidae
- Genus: Donus
- Species: D. elegans

Binomial name
- Donus elegans (Boheman, 1842)

Synonyms
- Hypera bonvouloiri Capiomont, 1867; Neoglanis elegans (Boheman, 1842); Phytonomus elegans Boheman, 1842

Species of beetle

Donus elegans is a species of true weevils in the tribe Hyperini.
