= Fronto capiomonti =

Scientific classification
- Kingdom: Animalia
- Phylum: Arthropoda
- Clade: Pancrustacea
- Class: Insecta
- Order: Coleoptera
- Suborder: Polyphaga
- Infraorder: Cucujiformia
- Family: Curculionidae
- Genus: Fronto
- Species: F. capiomonti

Binomial name
- Fronto capiomonti (Faust, 1882)

Synonyms
- Cepurus capiomonti Faust, 1882; Fronto bimaculatus Petri, 1901

Species of beetles

Fronto capiomonti is a species of true weevil in the tribe Hyperini.

This weevil is endemic to Korea.
