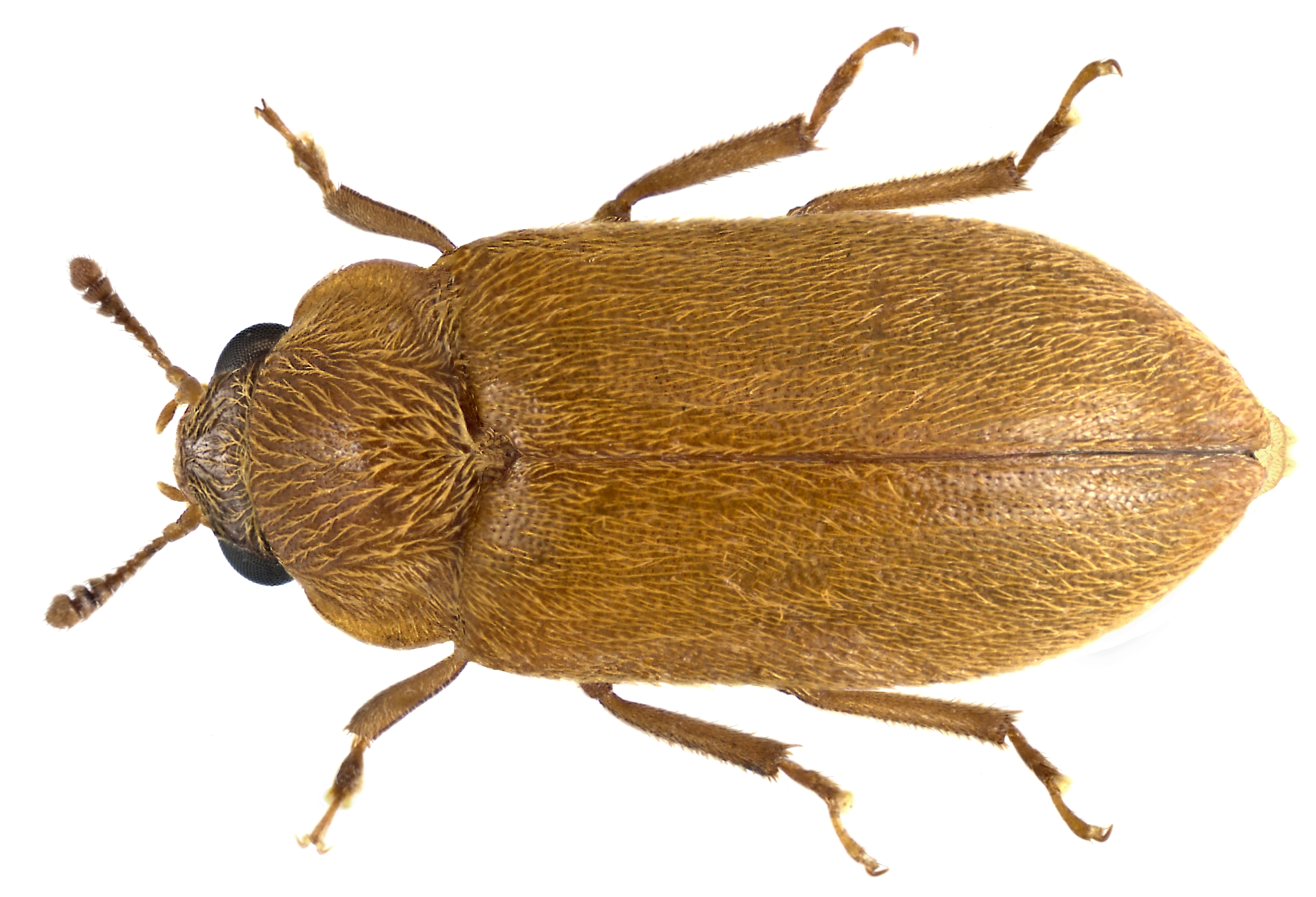

Scientific classification
- Kingdom: Animalia
- Phylum: Arthropoda
- Clade: Pancrustacea
- Class: Insecta
- Order: Coleoptera
- Suborder: Polyphaga
- Infraorder: Cucujiformia
- Family: Byturidae
- Genus: Byturus
- Species: B. ochraceus

Binomial name
- Byturus ochraceus (Scriba, 1791)

Synonyms
- Byturus olivaceus Fournel, 1840; Dermestes flavescens Marsham, 1802; Dermestes ochraceus Scriba, 1790; Horticola urbanus Lindemann, 1865

= Byturus ochraceus =

Species of beetle

Byturus ochraceus is a species of beetle in the fruitworm family Byturidae.

== Description ==
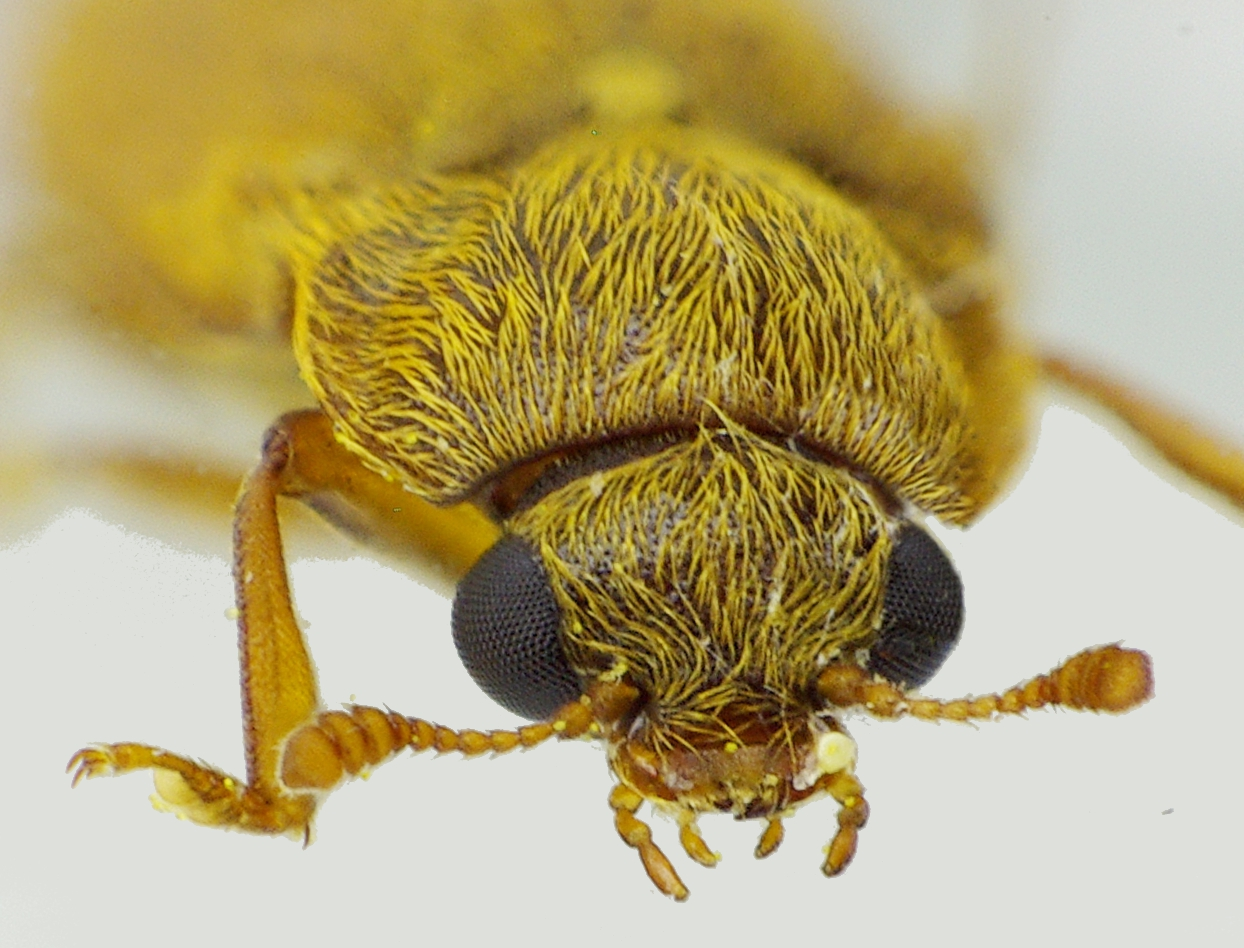
Byturus ochraceus front view: note the larger eyes than Byturus tomentosus

It is morphologically very similar to other members of the genus Byturus. All species of this genus are unlikely to be confused with any other family.

Byturus ochraceus measures 4.0–4.6 mm in length, are coloured yellow-brown with yellow hairs across the body. The pronotum is unevenly curved to the front so a front angle is apparent. The long diameter of the eyes is clearly greater than half the width of the frons. The underside is coloured dark brown to black. Some individuals change colour to grey-brown by June.

== Habitat and lifecycle ==
Byturus ochraceus adults are active from May until July. They are associated with a large range of host plants including: Taraxacum officinale, Salix, Caltha palustris, Potentilla anserina, Anthriscus sylvestris, Geum urbanum, Geranium robertianum, Alliaria officinale, Hieracium praealtum, Silene dioica, Stellaria nemorum, Lactuca muralis, and Ranunculus repens.
