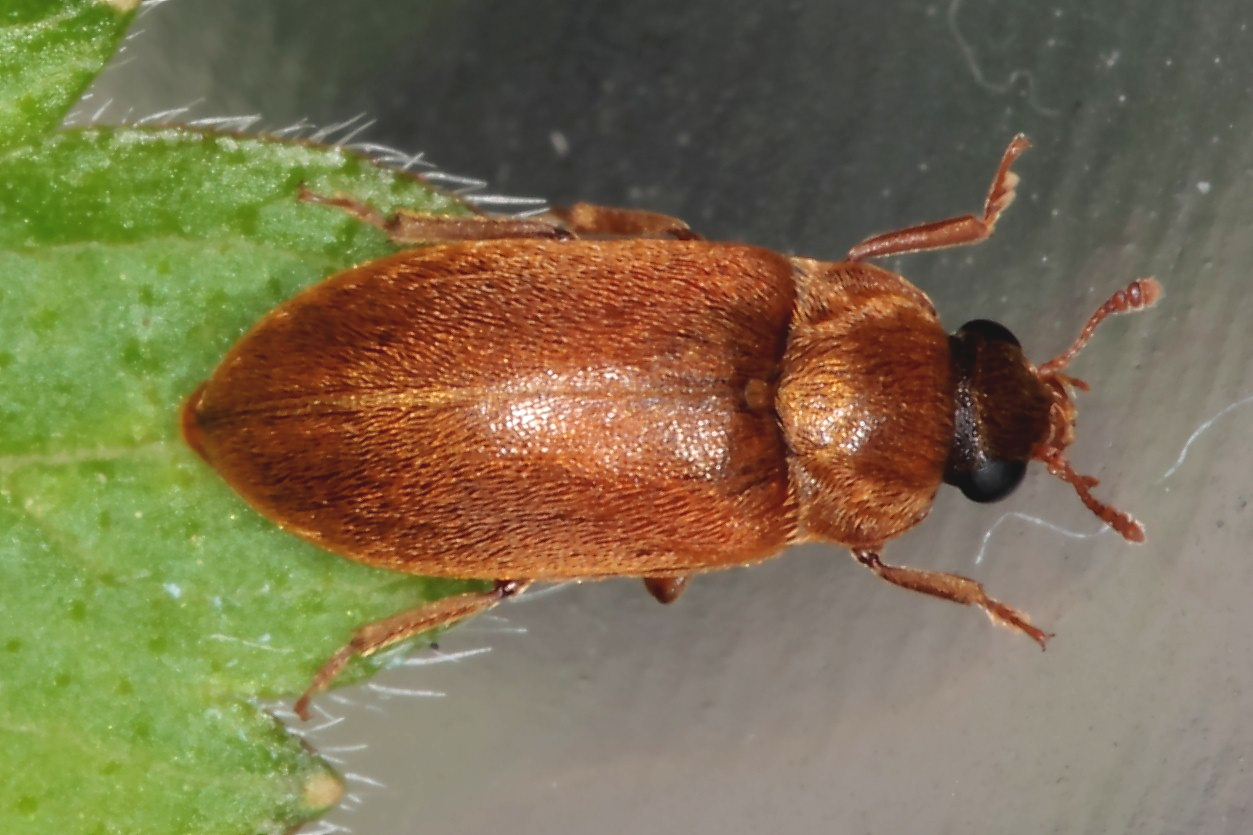
- Byturus ochraceus

Scientific classification
- Kingdom: Animalia
- Phylum: Arthropoda
- Clade: Pancrustacea
- Class: Insecta
- Order: Coleoptera
- Suborder: Polyphaga
- Infraorder: Cucujiformia
- Superfamily: Cleroidea
- Family: Byturidae; Gistel, 1848

Subfamilies
- see text

= Byturidae =

Family of beetles

Byturidae, also known as fruitworms, are small family of cleroid beetles with over 15 described species, primarily distributed in the Holarctic and Southeast Asia. The larvae of at least some genera feed on fruit, such as Byturus, a notable commercial pest of Rubus (blackberries and raspberries) consuming both the fruit and seeds, while others like Xerasia are associated with catkins. The adults are known to feed on developing leaves, flowers and pollen.

There are two subfamilies: Platydascillinae and Byturinae. The distribution of Byturinae is Holarctic. Species of Platydascillinae are found in Southeast Asia.

== Classification ==
Subfamilies and genera are as below:

- Subfamily Byturinae
  - Genus Haematoides
    - Haematoides davidis Fairmaire, 1878 (= Byturodes grahami)
  - Genus Byturus
    - Byturus affinis Reitter, 1874
    - Byturus ochraceus (Scriba, 1791)
    - Byturus tomentosus (De Geer, 1774)
    - Byturus unicolor Say, 1823
    - Byturus wittmeri Sen Gupta
  - Genus Xerasia
    - Xerasia grisescens (Jayne, 1882)
    - Xerasia meschniggi (Reitter, 1905)
    - Xerasia punica Goodrich & Springer, 1988
    - Xerasia variegata Lewis, 1895
- Subfamily Platydascillinae
  - Genus Bispinatus
    - Bispinatus capillatus Springer & Goodrich, 1995
    - Bispinatus vietnamensis Springer & Goodrich, 1994
  - Genus Dascillocyphon
    - Dascillocyphon minor Everts, 1909
  - Genus Platydascillus
    - Platydascillus sumatranus Everts, 1909
  - Genus Remigera
    - Remigera securiformis Springer & Goodrich, 1994
    - Remigera spatulata Springer & Goodrich, 1994
