= Tanarus (beetle) =

Scientific classification
- Kingdom: Animalia
- Phylum: Arthropoda
- Class: Insecta
- Order: Coleoptera
- Suborder: Polyphaga
- Infraorder: Cucujiformia
- Family: Curculionidae
- Tribe: Hyperini
- Genus: Tanarus; Hustache, 1921

Genus of beetles

Tanarus is a genus of true weevils in the tribe Hyperini.
