= Haematoides =

Haematoides davidis

Scientific classification
- Kingdom: Animalia
- Phylum: Arthropoda
- Clade: Pancrustacea
- Class: Insecta
- Order: Coleoptera
- Suborder: Polyphaga
- Infraorder: Cucujiformia
- Superfamily: Cleroidea
- Family: Byturidae
- Genus: Haematoides; Deyrolle & Fairmaire, 1878
- Species: H. davidis

Binomial name
- Haematoides davidis Fairmaire, 1878

Synonyms
- Byturodes grahami Barber, 1942; Haematoides davidii Ivie, 2001 (Missp.)

Genus of beetles

Haematoides is a genus of beetles in the family Byturidae. It is monotypic, being represented by the single species, Haematoides davidis. The species name has sometimes been misspelled as davidii.
