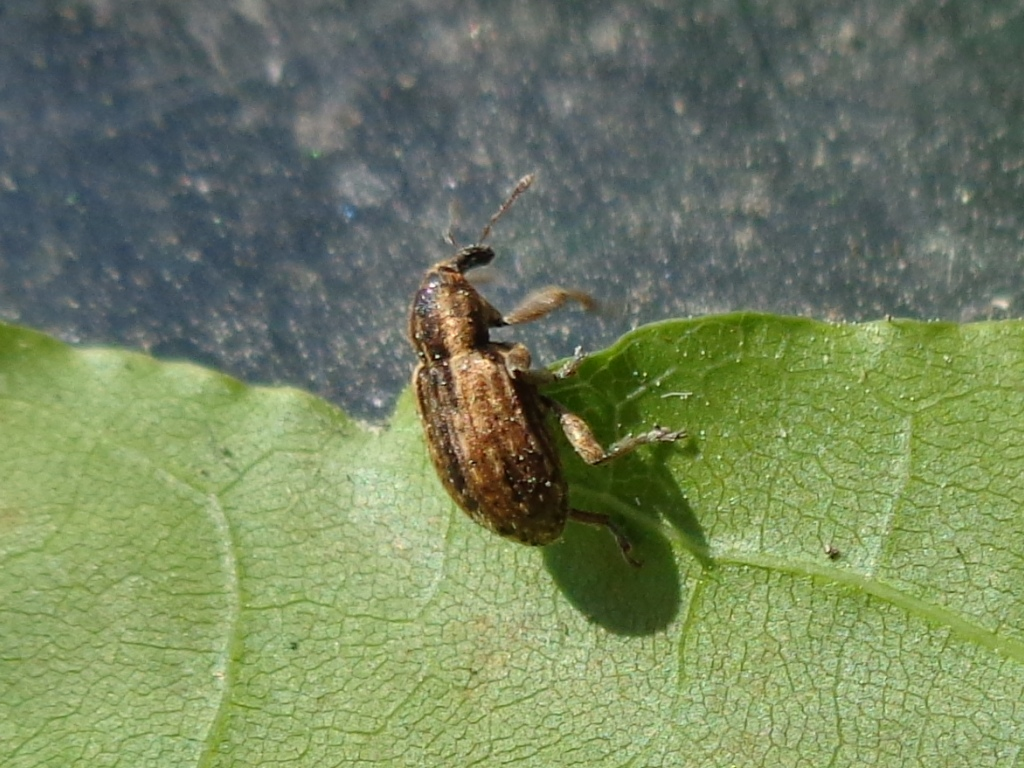

Scientific classification
- Kingdom: Animalia
- Phylum: Arthropoda
- Class: Insecta
- Order: Coleoptera
- Suborder: Polyphaga
- Infraorder: Cucujiformia
- Family: Curculionidae
- Genus: Hypera
- Species: H. postica

Binomial name
- Hypera postica (Gyllenhal, 1813)

Synonyms
- Rhynchaenus postica Gyllenhal, 1813

= Hypera postica =

Species of beetle

Hypera postica, commonly known as the alfalfa weevil, is a species of weevil; it can be found in alfalfa fields throughout Europe. Considered a destructive threat to alfalfa production in North America, several accidental introductions have been successfully countered though the use of a variety of biological control species.

== Description ==
The alfalfa weevil grows to a length of about 4 to 5.5 mm (0.16 to 0.22 in). The rostrum or beak is short and broad. The frons is half as wide as the rostrum while the pronotum is broadest in the centre. The general colour of the insect is brown, with a dark mid-dorsal stripe. The larva has a distinctive black head and no legs; it is yellowish-green, with a white dorsal stripe and faint white lateral stripes. It is about 1 cm (0.4 in) long just before pupation. It pupates in a white, pea-sized cocoon made of loosely-woven silk. It resembles the clover leaf weevil (Hypera punctata), but that species is nearly twice as large, the larvae have tan heads and they seldom cause much damage to alfalfa crops.

== Life cycle ==
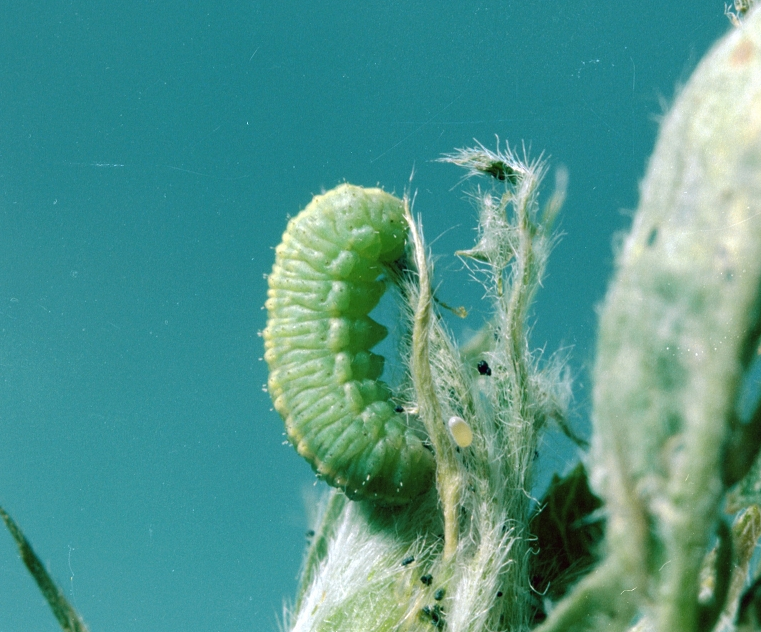
Larva

In Illinois, some eggs are laid in the late fall or the winter, when weather conditions permit. Adults also overwinter and become increasingly active in March and April. Eggs are laid in batches of up to 25 inside alfalfa stems. The larvae feed for three or four weeks, moulting three times, before pupating in the cocoons they make. They emerge as adults in about one or two weeks. After feeding for a week or two, they may experience aestivation during the remainder of the summer, in which they demonstrate a dampening of their metabolic, respiratory and nervous system activities. In fall, the adults hide in the crowns of alfalfa plants or move onto coarse vegetation in ditches or by fences or in nearby woodland.

== Damage ==
Both the larvae and the adults are diurnal and feed on the foliage of alfalfa, the larvae doing the most damage. The adults eat the edges of the leaves, giving them a feathery appearance. At first, the larvae feed on terminal leaves leaving puncture marks, but they later move down the plant to feed on lower leaves. The leaves attacked are skeletonised as the larvae feed between the veins, and plant yields can be reduced by up to 15%. Sometimes the larvae are killed by the pathogenic fungus Zoophthora phytonomi, especially in warm and humid weather. They may also be parasitized by ichneumon wasps, Bathylplectes anurus and B. curculionis. The female of these wasps is only about 0.125 in (0.32 cm) long, and lays an egg inside an early stage of the larva of the weevil. The developing wasp larva is a parasitoid, living inside the weevil larva and devouring it, eventually pupating soon after its host. The wasp's brownish cocoon has a broad white band in the case of B. curculionis, and a narrower, raised one in the case of B. anurus. When it is disturbed, the cocoon of the latter species can "jump" several centimetres to avoid predation. Both these species of wasp have been investigated for their potential for biological control of the weevil, and B. anurus is generally considered superior to B. curculionis because of its higher reproductive rate.
