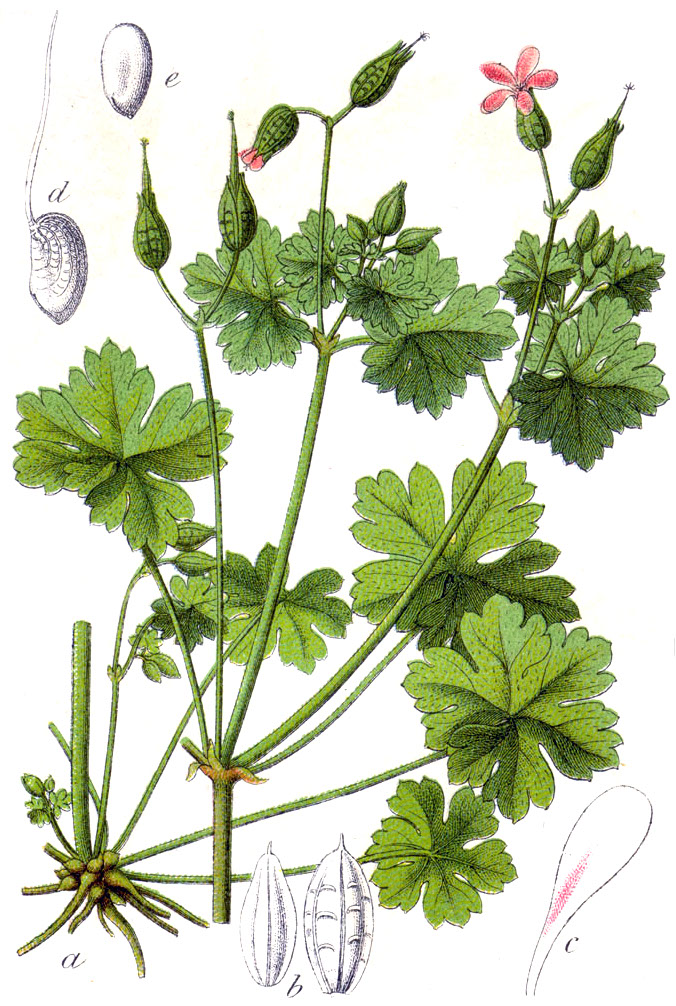

Scientific classification
- Kingdom: Plantae
- Clade: Tracheophytes
- Clade: Angiosperms
- Clade: Eudicots
- Clade: Rosids
- Order: Geraniales
- Family: Geraniaceae
- Genus: Geranium
- Species: G. lucidum

Binomial name
- Geranium lucidum L.

= Geranium lucidum =

Species of flowering plant

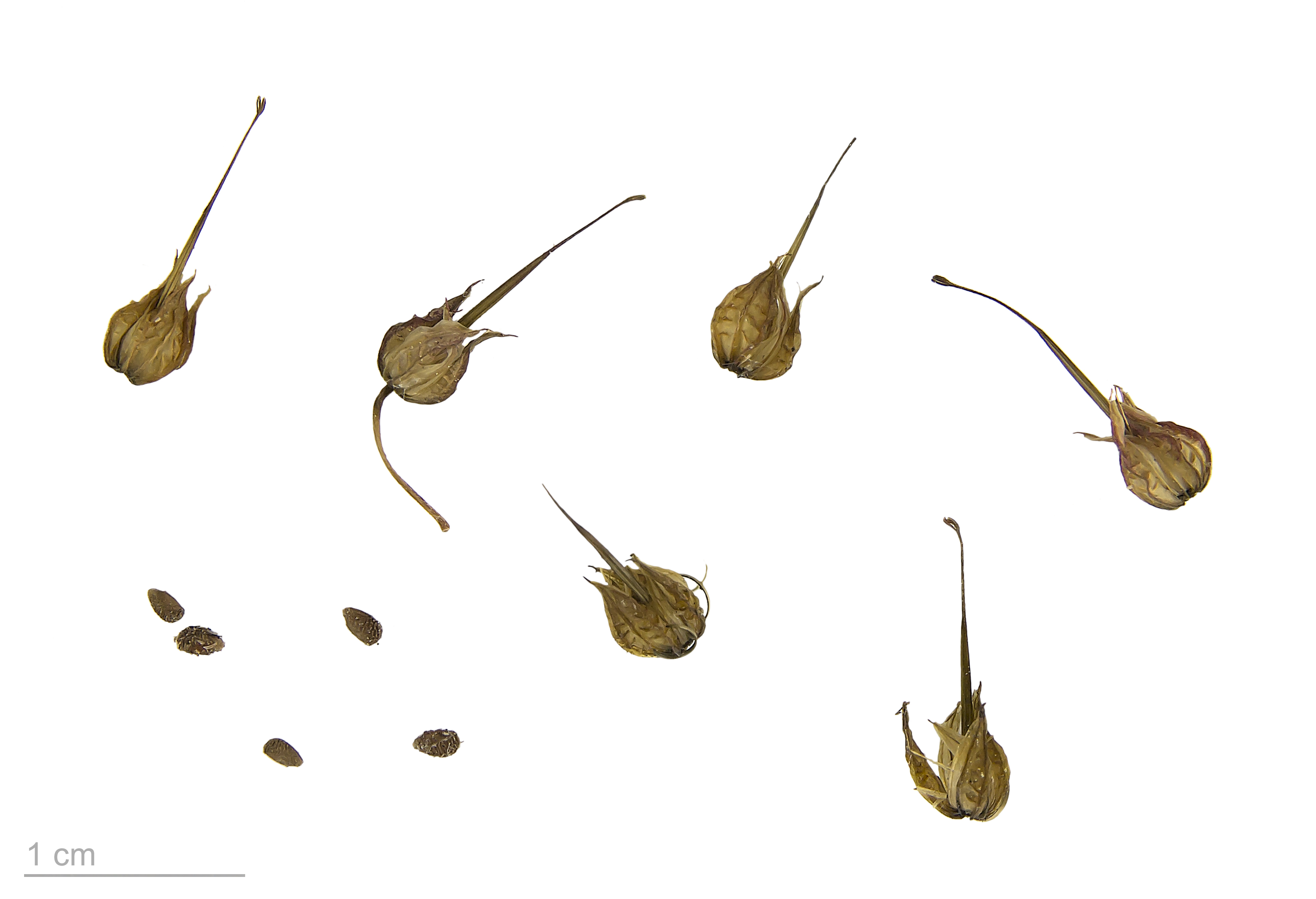
Geranium lucidum - MHNT

Geranium lucidum, commonly known as shining cranesbill or (in North America) shining geranium or shiny geranium, is a herbaceous annual plant of the genus Geranium. It is native to Europe, western Asia and North Africa. It has been introduced to North America as a garden plant and in places, particularly the Pacific Northwest, has become naturalised and is viewed as an invasive species and noxious weed.

== Description ==
The shining cranesbill is an annual plant with stems up to 35 cm (14 in) long, brittle, fleshy, hairless and often red. Leaves round or kidney-shaped and glossy, palmately-lobed or divided bluntly to about two-thirds of their depth, sometimes with short hairs on the upper surface. Flowers with parts in fives, with sharply keeled sepals and bright pink, rounded petals, some 10 mm (0.4 in) in diameter, the 8 to 10 mm (0.3 to 0.4 in) petals having long bases and flat blades. These are borne in pairs from May to August. The fruits are beaked capsules, ridged and slightly hairy, at least on the edges, and splitting open into five parts. The seeds are smooth. The whole plant has a tendency to turn red.

== Distribution ==
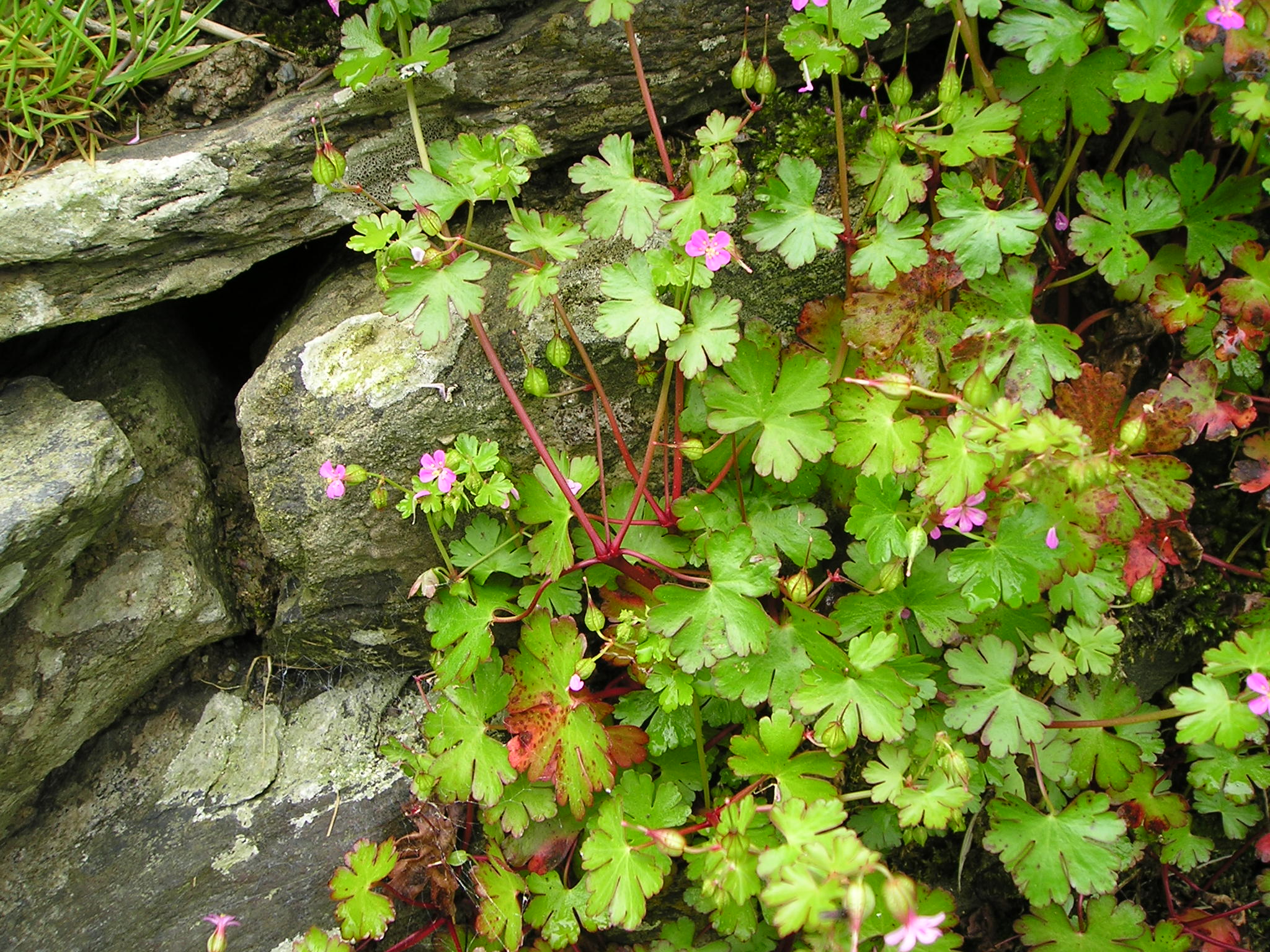
Shining cranesbill on a wall in Wales

The shining cranesbill is native to Europe, Asia as far east as the Himalayas and northern Africa. This plant is common in Great Britain and Ireland, especially in the southwest and west, but uncommon in Scotland. It is found at altitudes of up to 610 m (2,000 ft). It has been grown as a garden plant in parts of the United States and has become naturalised in the Pacific Northwest.

== Habitat ==
The shining cranesbill is common on limestone rocks and walls, and in churchyards on roadside verges, banks, gardens and bare ground; it thrives on chalky or sandy soil. It is also common on acid soils and shady banks. The plant has good dispersal abilities because the seed is explosively thrown out of the capsule, allowing the plant to move up slopes and exploit crevices in tree trunks and recesses in walls that are higher than the parent plant.

== Invasive species ==
In parts of the United States including California, Washington state and the Willamette Valley in Oregon, shining cranesbill has become naturalised. It was first detected in the US in 1971 and has since been declared a noxious weed in Washington and Oregon. A 2013 survey by USDA reported that it was present in five counties in Washington, thirteen in Oregon and two in California. It was detected in Canada in 1982, on Vancouver Island in British Columbia, and has been introduced into Australia and New Zealand.

When naturalised in the Pacific Northwest, it is often seen in association with the related European plant, herb Robert (Geranium robertianum), also classified as a noxious weed. In these areas, shining cranesbill seems to thrive in woodlands and forest glades, where it tends to overwhelm the native plants. State legislation has been enacted making it "prohibited to transport, buy, sell, offer for sale, or to distribute plants or plant parts, seeds in packets, blends or "wildflower mixes" of this species, into or within the state of Washington".
