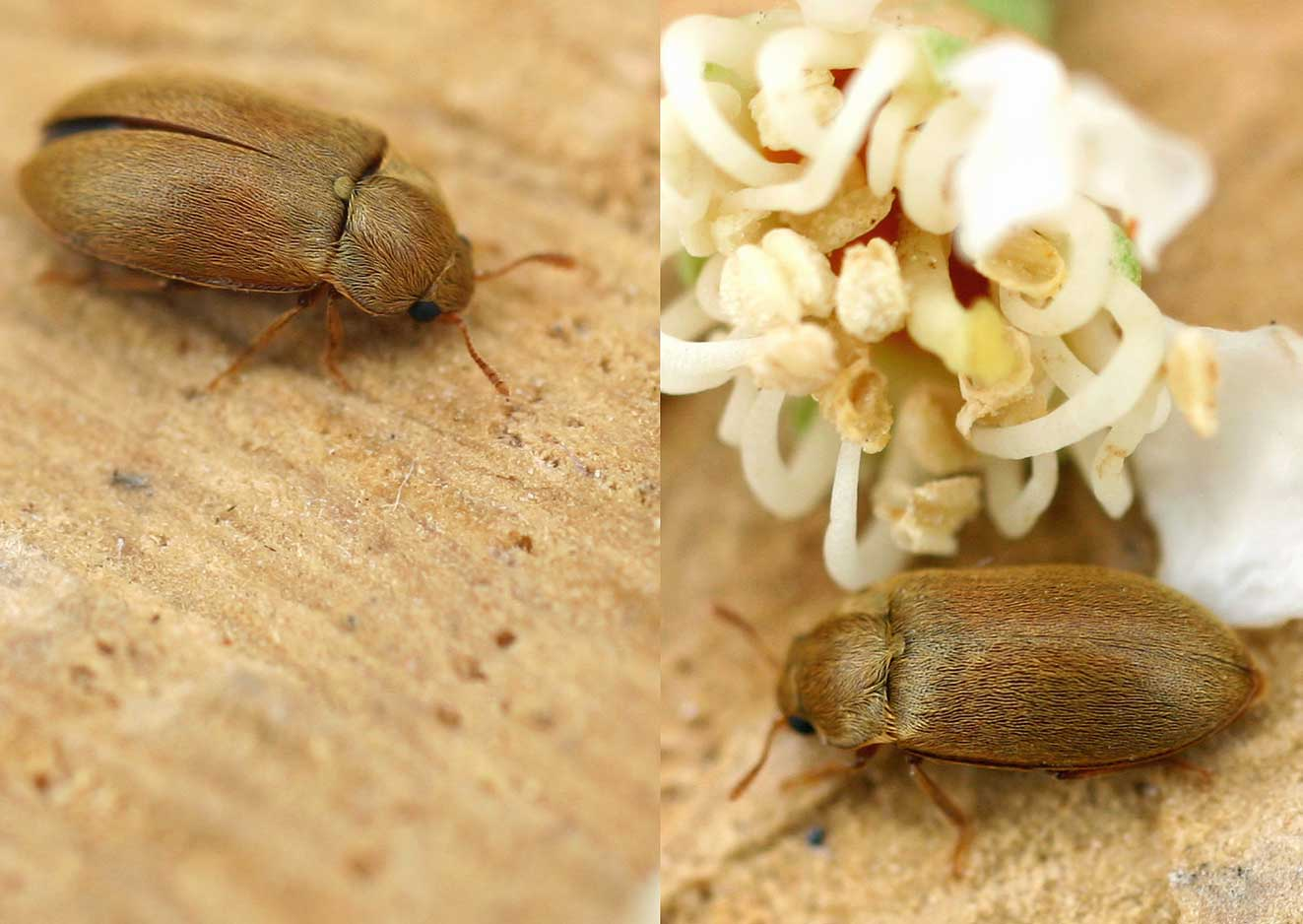

Scientific classification
- Kingdom: Animalia
- Phylum: Arthropoda
- Clade: Pancrustacea
- Class: Insecta
- Order: Coleoptera
- Suborder: Polyphaga
- Infraorder: Cucujiformia
- Family: Byturidae
- Genus: Byturus
- Species: B. tomentosus

Binomial name
- Byturus tomentosus (De Geer, 1774)

= Raspberry beetle =

Species of beetle

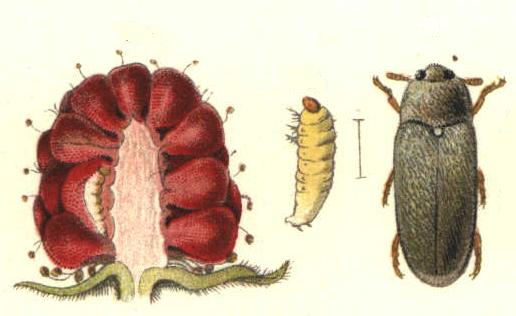
Imagus, larva and damaged raspberry fruit

The raspberry beetle (Byturus tomentosus) is a species of beetle in the fruitworm family Byturidae. It is a major pest that is widespread in north-central Europe, affecting raspberry, blackberry and loganberry plants.

This species is related to the raspberry fruitworm (B. urbanus) which is native to North America.

== Behaviour ==
Byturus tomentosus (Raspberry beetle)

The beetles find raspberry flowers using vision and smell and lay eggs on them, which hatch into pale brown larvae. The larvae feed on the developing fruit and cause the fruit to appear smaller and shriveled. The female adult beetles can lay up to 120 eggs. Adult beetles also feed on the leaves of the plant and its flowers. Grown beetles overwinter in the soil below their host plants.

== Pest control ==
Because the larvae are hidden in the raspberry fruit during most growing stages, natural predators do not have a large influence on the beetle population. The raspberry beetle is often controlled by use of derris, a pesticide. Although experts in ecological and organic growing no longer consider derris ecologically sound, Rotenone which is made from derris is still sold in the U.S. Some wild raspberry species are resistant against the beetle larvae.

== Economic significance ==
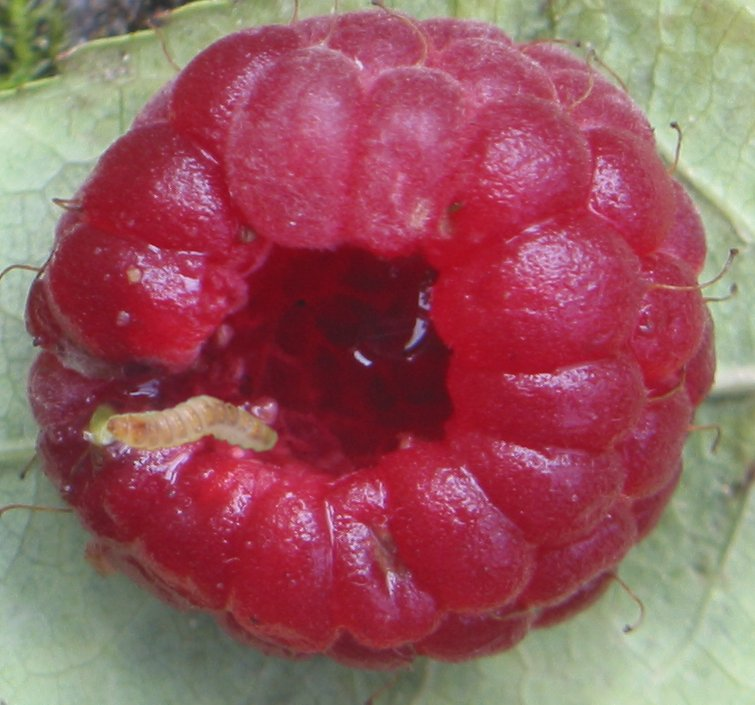
Raspberry beetle larva on a raspberry

The pest damages both wild and cultivated raspberries and also blackberries. The beetles eat portions of the flowers and young leaflets and lay their eggs between the stamens and pistils. The larvae tunnel in the developing fruit which remain small, become pale in colour, fade or rot. The larvae then drop to the soil and pupate underground. Control measures include digging-over the soil around bushes and inter-row ploughing. Chemical pesticides may be applied at the flowering stage. White sticky traps are sometimes used to catch beetles.
