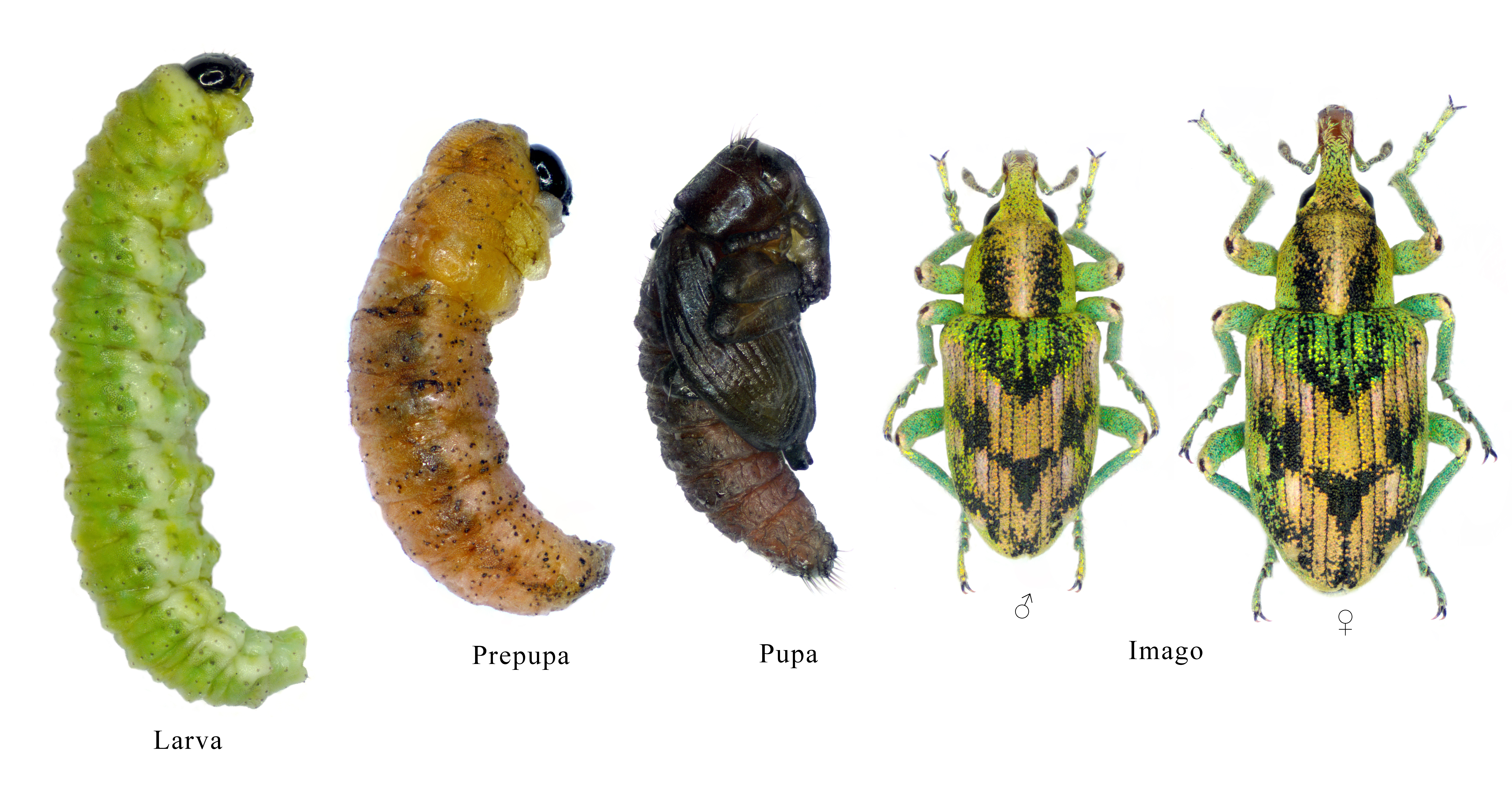
- Part of lifecycle of splendid tamarisk weevil (Coniatus (Bagoides) splendidulus Fabricius, 1781) (Hyperini).

Scientific classification
- Kingdom: Animalia
- Phylum: Arthropoda
- Clade: Pancrustacea
- Class: Insecta
- Order: Coleoptera
- Suborder: Polyphaga
- Infraorder: Cucujiformia
- Superfamily: Curculionoidea
- Family: Curculionidae
- Subfamily: Hyperinae
- Tribe: Hyperini; Lacordaire, 1863

Subtribes
- Cepurina; Coniatina; Hyperina; Macrotarrhusina; ?Phaeopholina

Synonyms
- Hyperini Stein, J.P.E.F., 1868; Hyperininae Hustache, A., 1921; Hyperinini Hustache, A., 1925; Phytonomini Gistel, 1848

= Hyperini =

Tribe of beetles

Hyperini is a tribe of true weevils (family Curculionidae) in the subfamily Hyperinae.

== Overview of genera ==
- Adonus
- Agriochaeta
- Alexiola
- Asiodonus
- Bagoides
- Boreohypera
- Brachypera
- Bubalocephalus
- Cephalalges
- Cepurellus
- Cepurus
- Chloropholus
- Coniatrichus
- Coniatus
- Diastrophilus
- Donus
- Ectomochila
- Eremochorus
- Eurychirus
- Fronto
- Frontodes
- Geranorhinus
- Gerynassa
- Haplopodus
- Herpes
- Hypera
- Hyperites
- Isorhinus
- Lamprohypera
- Larinosomus
- Limobius
- Lycosura
- Macrotarrhus
- Metadonus
- Nothyperus
- Oreochorus
- Orthodonus
- Pachypera
- Parahypera
- Phaeopholus (tentatively placed here)
- Phelypera
- Saginesis
- Sibirodonus
- Tanarus
- Tigrinellus
- Tylopterus
- Xeda
- Zaslavskypera
