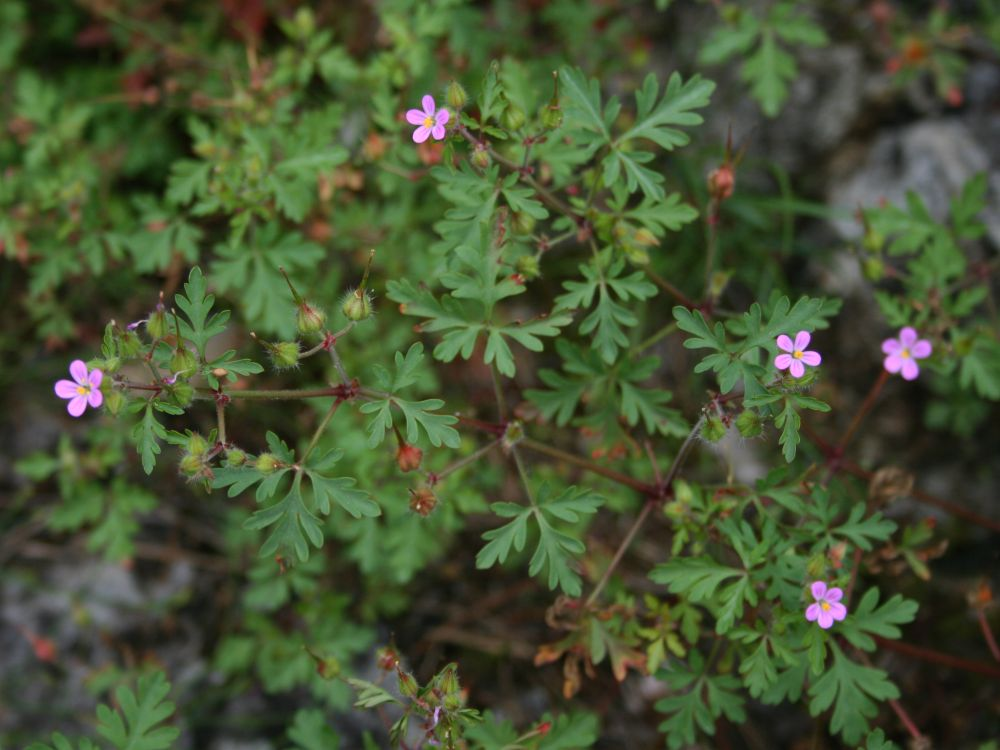

Scientific classification
- Kingdom: Plantae
- Clade: Tracheophytes
- Clade: Angiosperms
- Clade: Eudicots
- Clade: Rosids
- Order: Geraniales
- Family: Geraniaceae
- Genus: Geranium
- Species: G. purpureum

Binomial name
- Geranium purpureum Vill.

Synonyms
- Homotypic synonyms: Geranium robertianum proles purpureum (Vill.) Rouy; Geranium robertianum subsp. purpureum (Vill.) Nyman; Geranium robertianum purpureum (Vill.) Pers.; Geranium robertianum var. purpureum (Vill.) DC.; Robertium purpureum (Vill.) Fourr.; Robertium vulgare var. purpureum (Vill.) Picard; Heterotypic synonyms: Geranium eginense Hausskn. & Sint. ex R.Knuth; Geranium mediterraneum Jord.; Geranium minutiflorum Jord.; Geranium modestum Jord.; Geranium purpureum var. forsteri Wilmott; Geranium purpureum subsp. forsteri (Wilmott) H.G.Baker; Geranium purpureum var. intricatum (Gren. ex Rouy) Graebn.; Geranium purpureum var. mediterraneum (Jord.) Graebn.; Geranium purpureum var. minutiflorum (Jord.) Loret & Barrandon; Geranium purpureum var. modestum (Fourr.) Hausskn.; Geranium purpureum var. modestum (Fourr.) Nyman; Geranium purpureum f. subeglandulosum H.Lindb.; Geranium robertianum var. incisum A.St.-Hil.; Geranium robertianum f. intricatum (Gren. ex Rouy) Merino; Geranium robertianum var. intricatum Gren. ex Rouy; Geranium robertianum subvar. mediterraneum (Jord.) Litard.; Geranium robertianum var. mediterraneum (Jord.) Rouy; Geranium robertianum f. minutiflorum (Jord.) Merino; Geranium robertianum var. minutiflorum (Jord.) St.-Lag.; Geranium robertianum f. modestum (Fourr.) F.N.Williams; Geranium robertianum var. modestum (Fourr.) St.-Lag.; Geranium robertianum subvar. modestum (Fourr.) Litard.; Geranium robertianum var. parviflorum Viv.; Geranium robertianum var. rubricaule Hornem.; Geranium robertianum f. subeglandulosum H.Lindb.; Geranium robertianum var. villarsianum (Jord.) Rouy & Foucaud; Geranium semiglabrum Jord. ex Boreau; Geranium simile Jord. ex Nyman; Geranium villarsianum Jord.; Robertium minutiflorum (Jord.) Fourr.; Robertium modestum Fourr.; Robertium semiglabrum (Jord. ex Boreau) Fourr.; Robertium simile Fourr.

= Geranium purpureum =

Species of flowering plant

Geranium purpureum, the little-robin, is a species of flowering plant in the geranium family Geraniaceae. It is native to Europe, Africa, and western Asia, and introduced on all continents except Antarctica. It is similar in appearance to Geranium robertianum, a close relative.

== Description ==
Geranium purpureum is an annual (sometimes biennial), herbaceous, flowering plant. It has small flowers with 5 sepals and 5 petals, each petal being 6.3–8.4 mm long and 1.5–2.0 mm wide. The flower has 10 stamens, each with a yellow anther. In the center of the flower, a single fused style supports 5 stigmas. The fruit is a schizocarp, which splits into 5 one-seeded mericarps at maturity.

=== Identification ===
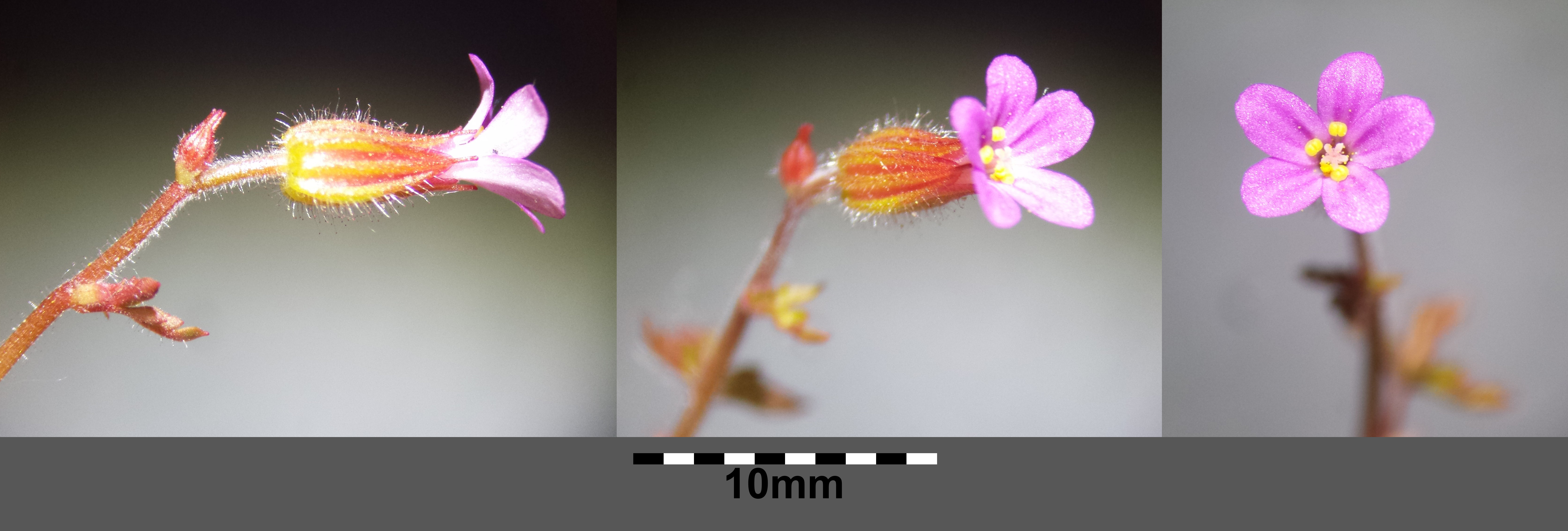
Flower with corolla approximately 7 mm in diameter

Geranium purpureum is often confused with Geranium robertianum, a close relative. The primary character that distinguishes the two species is flower size. The corolla of Geranium purpureum is approximately 7.5 mm in diameter while that of Geranium robertianum is at least twice that size (15–20 mm). (For comparison, a U.S. dime is approximately 18 mm in diameter.) An identification key for genus Geranium in California distinguishes the two species as follows:

- Geranium purpureum: Petals (5.3–)6.3–8.4(–9.9) mm long, (0.8–)1.5–2.0(–2.6) mm wide; anthers yellow; middle leaf segment 5–20(–38)-lobed in distal half; mericarp with 1–4 collar-like rings at tip
- Geranium robertianum: Petals (8.5–)10.5–12.5(–14.2) mm long, (2.1–)2.6–4.5(–6.1) mm wide; anthers purplish; middle leaf segment 16–37(–49)-lobed in distal half; mericarp with 1–2(–3) collar-like rings at tip

Other keys emphasize the hairs on the sepals as a distinguishing characteristic. All keys include anther color but since both species have yellow pollen, plants can be difficult to distinguish based on anther color alone. Geranium purpureum and Geranium robertianum have chromosome numbers 2n = 32 and 2n = 64, respectively.

== Taxonomy ==
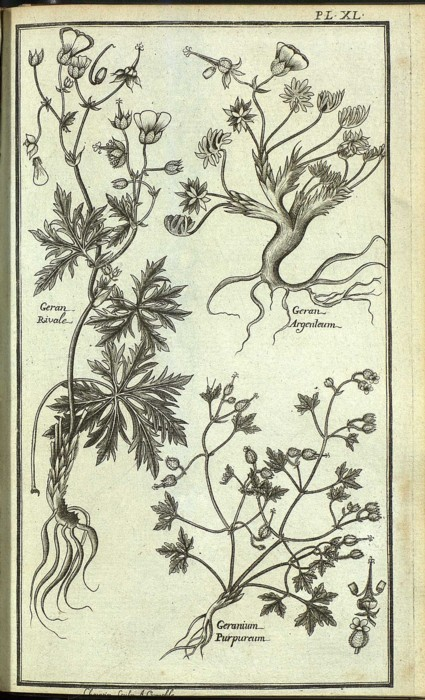
Illustration of Geranium purpureum (lower righthand corner) published by Villars in 1789

Geranium purpureum was first described and named by the French botanist Domínique Villars in February 1786. A second description was published by Villars in June of the same year. Taken together, he described a plant growing on the rocks with red leaves and a tiny reddish-pink corolla. In 1788, he further described the leaves as pinnately lobed with 5 segments. Finally he published an illustration of Geranium purpureum in 1789.

Geranium purpureum Vill. is a member of Geranium section Ruberta in family Geraniaceae. As of September 2025, the name Geranium purpureum Vill. is widely accepted. Some authorities accept the name Geranium robertianum subsp. purpureum (Vill.) Nyman, a homotypic synonym of Geranium purpureum Vill.

== Distribution and habitat ==
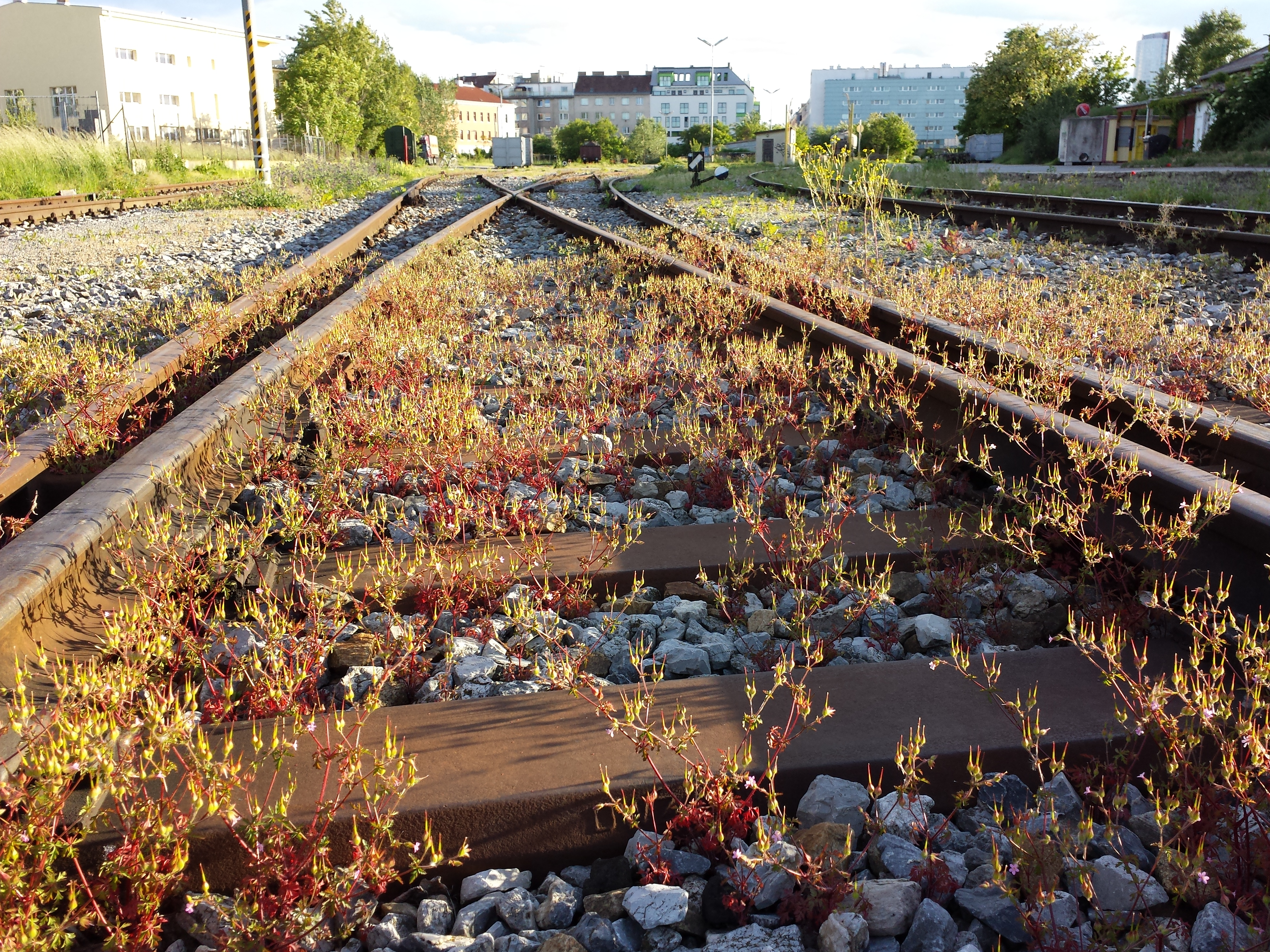
Geranium purpureum growing along the tracks at the Wien Floridsdorf railway station in Vienna

Geranium purpureum ranges from Great Britain southeastward to the Caucasus, with native populations occurring as far south as central Africa. Non-native populations occur on all continents except Antarctica. Introduced populations are often found along railway corridors.

== Ecology ==
Geranium purpureum can not survive winters with an average January temperature of 4 °C (39 °F) or less.

== Bibliography ==
- Aedo, Carlos (2017). "Taxonomic Revision of Geranium sect. Ruberta and Unguiculata (Geraniaceae)". Annals of the Missouri Botanical Garden. 102 (3): 409–465. Bibcode:2017AnMBG.102..409A. doi:10.3417/D-16-00016A. JSTOR 26573058.
- Eliáš, Pavol, Jr. (2011). "Geranium purpureum Vill. — new alien species to the Slovak flora". Thaiszia Journal of Botany. 21: 21–28.
- Kim, Hye-Won; Sun, Eun-Mi; Jung, Su-Young; Son, Dong Chan (2019). "Geranium purpureum Vill.: A new casual alien plant in Korea". Korean Journal of Plant Taxonomy. 49 (3): 209–214. doi:10.11110/kjpt.2019.49.3.209.
- Villars, Domínique (February 1786a). Histoire des Plantes de Dauphiné, Vol. 1.
- Villars, Domínique (June 1786b). Flora Delphinalis. Sumptibus Piestre & Delamolliere.
- Villars, Domínique (1788). Histoire des Plantes de Dauphiné, Vol. 3, Part 1.
- Villars, Domínique (1789). Histoire des Plantes de Dauphiné, Vol. 3, Part 2.
