= Xerasia grisescens =

Scientific classification
- Kingdom: Animalia
- Phylum: Arthropoda
- Class: Insecta
- Order: Coleoptera
- Suborder: Polyphaga
- Infraorder: Cucujiformia
- Family: Byturidae
- Genus: Xerasia
- Species: X. grisescens

Binomial name
- Xerasia grisescens (Jayne, 1882)

Species of beetle

Xerasia grisescens is a species of fruitworm beetle in the family Byturidae. It is found in North America. It is usually found in a diverse environments, from wet or dry regions.
