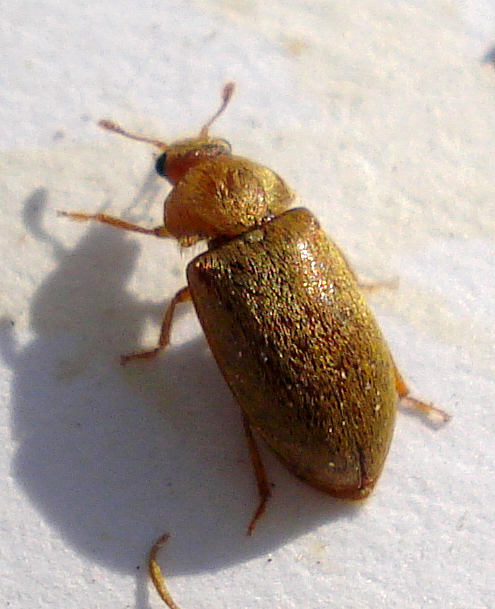

Scientific classification
- Kingdom: Animalia
- Phylum: Arthropoda
- Clade: Pancrustacea
- Class: Insecta
- Order: Coleoptera
- Suborder: Polyphaga
- Infraorder: Cucujiformia
- Family: Byturidae
- Genus: Byturus; Latreille, 1796

= Byturus =

Genus of beetles

Byturus is a genus of fruitworm beetles in the family Byturidae. There are about seven described species in Byturus, found mainly in Europe, North America, and eastern Asia.

== Species ==
These species are members of the genus Byturus:

- Byturus affinis Reitter, 1874
- Byturus holzschuhi Hava, 2025
- Byturus oblongulus Fairmaire, 1891
- Byturus ochraceus (Scriba, 1791)
- Byturus tomentosus (De Geer, 1774)
- Byturus unicolor Say, 1823 (raspberry fruitworm)
- Byturus wittmeri Sen Gupta
