= Xerasia =

Scientific classification
- Kingdom: Animalia
- Phylum: Arthropoda
- Class: Insecta
- Order: Coleoptera
- Suborder: Polyphaga
- Infraorder: Cucujiformia
- Family: Byturidae
- Genus: Xerasia; Lewis, 1895

Genus of beetles

Xerasia is a genus of fruitworm beetles in the family Byturidae. There are four described species in Xerasia. They are native to California and found in a variety of environments such as wet and dry areas.

== Species ==
- Xerasia grisescens (Jayne, 1882)
- Xerasia meschniggi (Reitter, 1905)
- Xerasia punica Goodrich & Springer, 1988
- Xerasia variegata Lewis, 1895
