= Tylopterus =

Scientific classification
- Kingdom: Animalia
- Phylum: Arthropoda
- Class: Insecta
- Order: Coleoptera
- Suborder: Polyphaga
- Infraorder: Cucujiformia
- Family: Curculionidae
- Tribe: Hyperini
- Genus: Tylopterus; Capiomont, 1867

Species
- Tylopterus camelus Cap., 1867; Tylopterus ligeri Hustache, A., 1924; Tylopterus lizeri Hustache, 1924; Tylopterus ochraceus Cap., 1867; Tylopterus pallidus LeConte, J.L., 1876; Tylopterus varius LeConte, J.L., 1876

Synonyms
- Tilopterus (Petri, 1901)

Genus of beetles

Tylopterus is a genus of true weevils in the tribe Hyperini.
