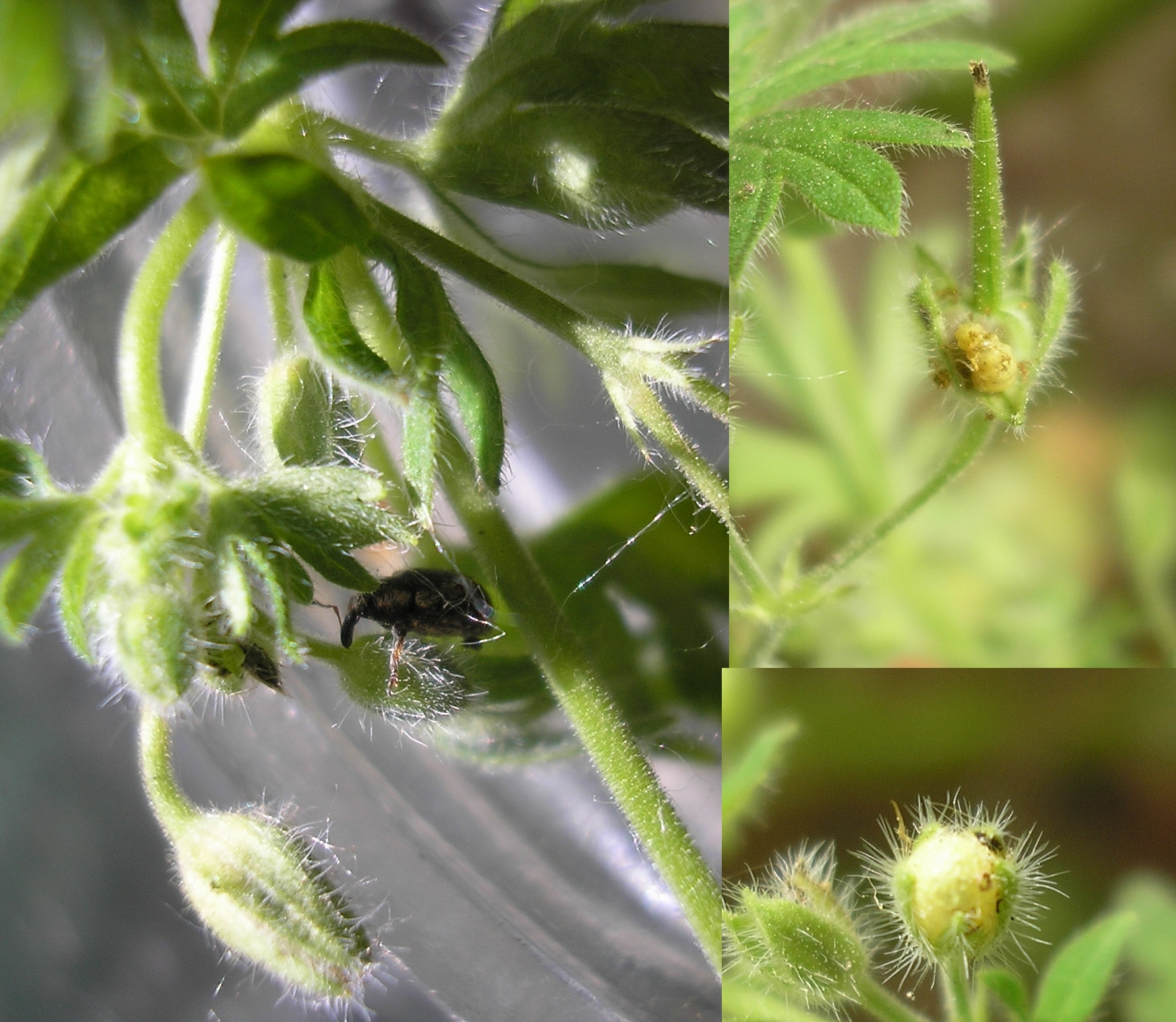
- Limobius borealis

Scientific classification
- Domain: Eukaryota
- Kingdom: Animalia
- Phylum: Arthropoda
- Class: Insecta
- Order: Coleoptera
- Suborder: Polyphaga
- Infraorder: Cucujiformia
- Family: Curculionidae
- Genus: Limobius; Schoenherr, 1843

= Limobius =

Genus of beetles

Limobius is a genus of beetles belonging to the family Curculionidae.

The species of this genus are found in Europe.

Species:

- Limobius arvernus Tempère, 1972
- Limobius borealis (Paykull, 1792)
