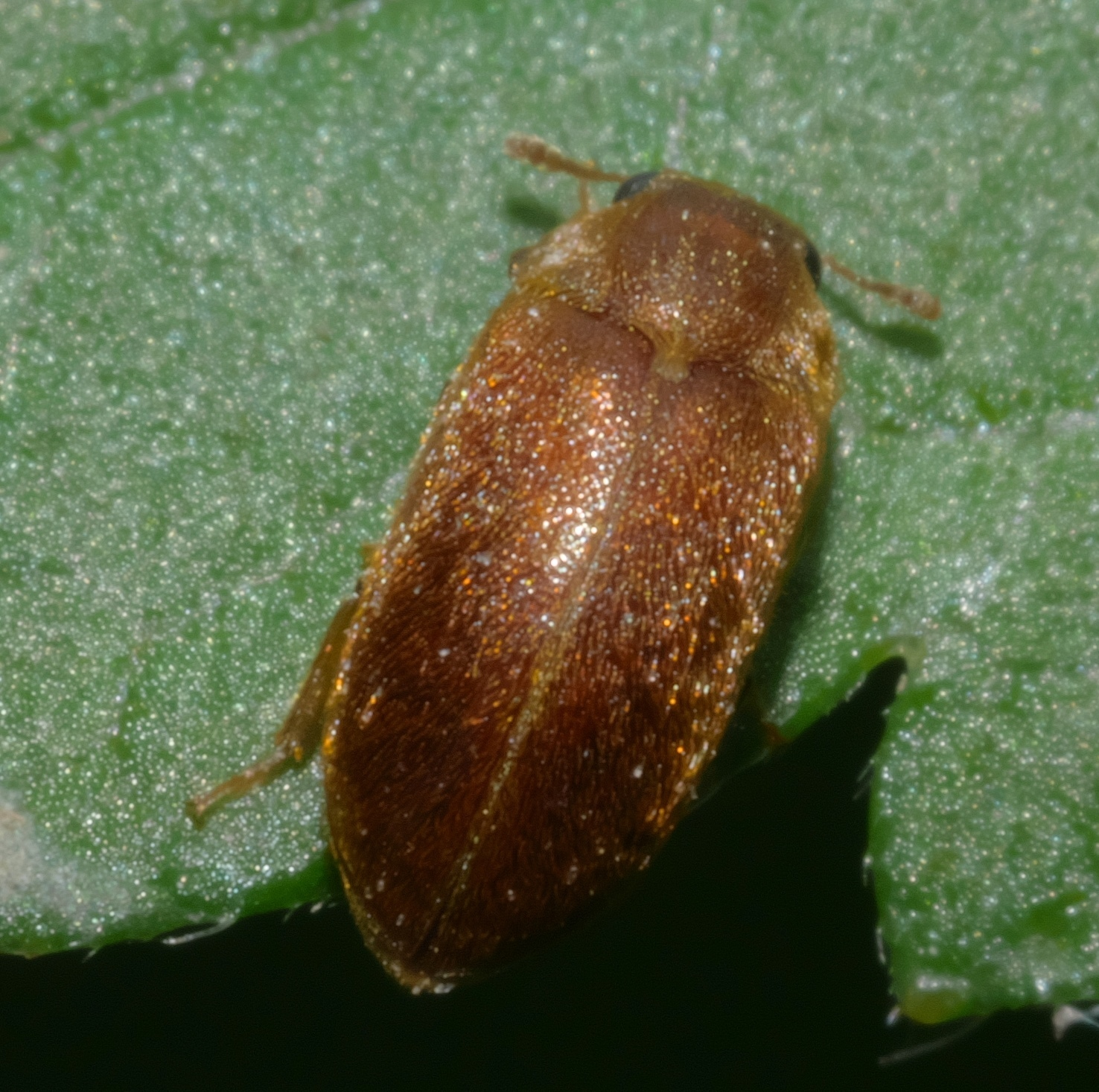
- Byturus unicolor, Oklahoma

Scientific classification
- Kingdom: Animalia
- Phylum: Arthropoda
- Clade: Pancrustacea
- Class: Insecta
- Order: Coleoptera
- Suborder: Polyphaga
- Infraorder: Cucujiformia
- Family: Byturidae
- Genus: Byturus
- Species: B. unicolor

Binomial name
- Byturus unicolor Say, 1823

Synonyms
- Byturus bakeri Barber, 1942

= Byturus unicolor =

Species of beetle

Byturus unicolor, known generally as raspberry fruitworm, is a species of fruitworm beetle in the family Byturidae whose larvae feed on raspberry fruit, causing commercial damage. Other common names include the western raspberry fruitworm and fruitworm beetle. It is found in Central America and North America.

“The adult is a small yellowish-brown beetle 4–5 mm in length. The larvae are about 8 mm long, white with brown areas on the back of each segment.”
