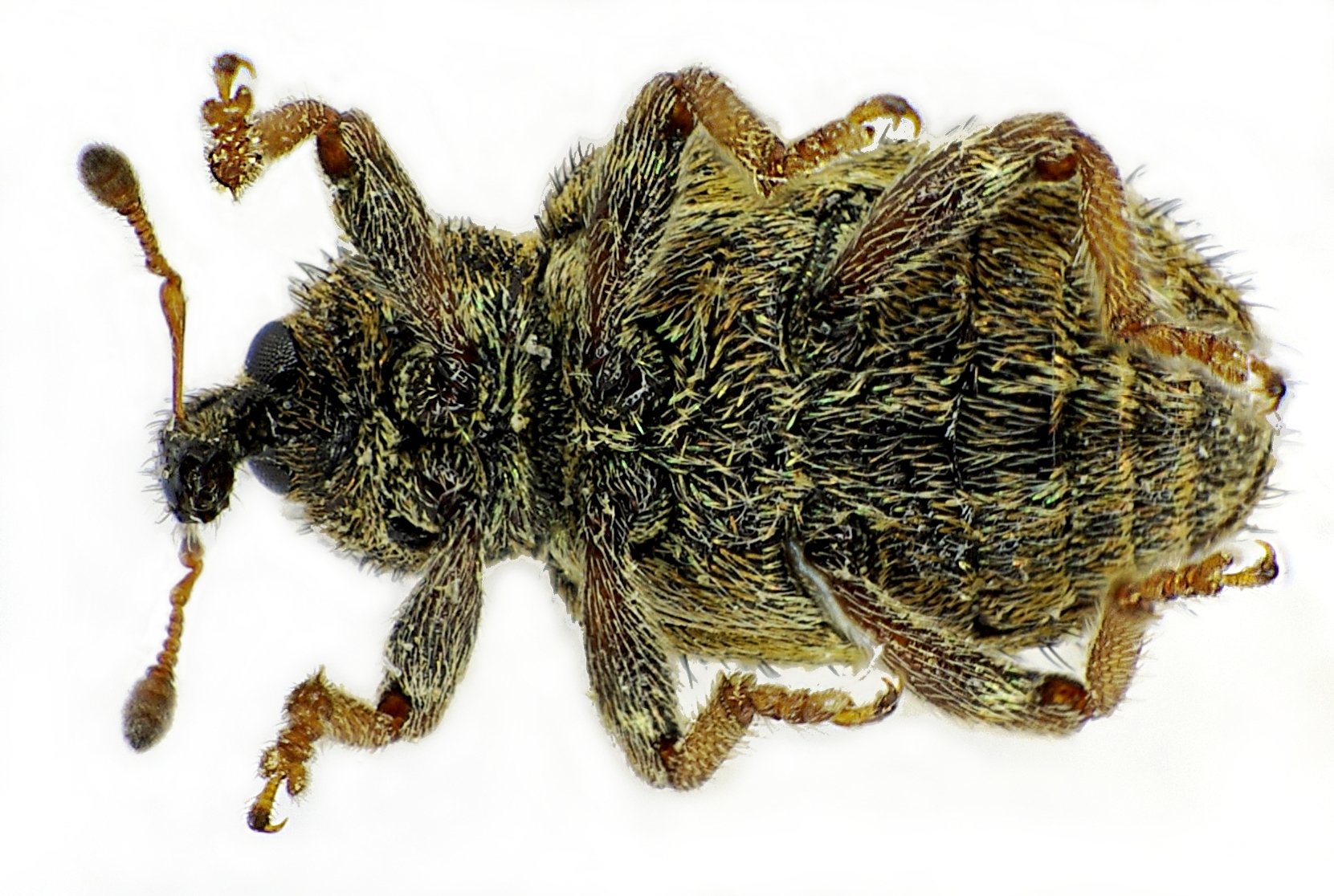

Scientific classification
- Kingdom: Animalia
- Phylum: Arthropoda
- Clade: Pancrustacea
- Class: Insecta
- Order: Coleoptera
- Suborder: Polyphaga
- Infraorder: Cucujiformia
- Family: Curculionidae
- Genus: Limobius
- Species: L. borealis

Binomial name
- Limobius borealis (Paykull, 1792)

= Limobius borealis =

Species of beetle

Limobius borealis is a species of beetle belonging to the family Curculionidae.

It is native to Europe. Larvae develop in the unripe flowerheads of Geranium species.
