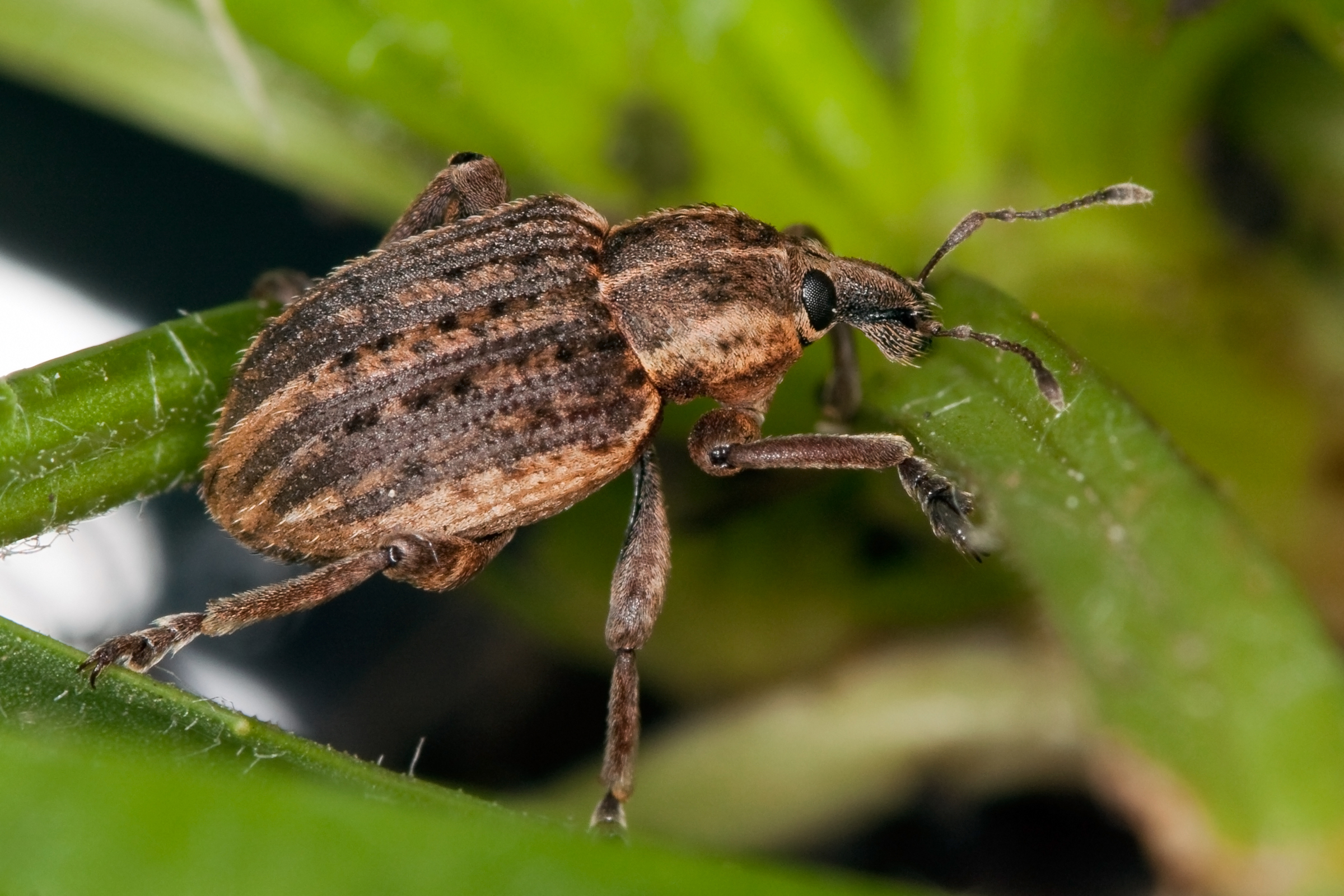

Scientific classification
- Kingdom: Animalia
- Phylum: Arthropoda
- Clade: Pancrustacea
- Class: Insecta
- Order: Coleoptera
- Suborder: Polyphaga
- Infraorder: Cucujiformia
- Superfamily: Curculionoidea
- Family: Curculionidae
- Genus: Hypera
- Species: H. zoilus

Binomial name
- Hypera zoilus Scopoli, 1763

Synonyms
- Hypera punctata Fabricius, 1775

= Hypera zoilus =

Species of beetle

Hypera zoilus (syn. H. punctata), commonly known as the clover leaf weevil, is an outdated species name of Brachypera zoilus, re-categorized in 2008. It is a species of weevil that can be found in clover fields throughout North America and Europe. It is typically brown and 5–9 mm in length.
