= Donus (beetle) =

- Dorsal view of a brown weevil belonging to the genus Donus on green leaves looking downwards

Scientific classification
- Kingdom: Animalia
- Phylum: Arthropoda
- Clade: Pancrustacea
- Class: Insecta
- Order: Coleoptera
- Suborder: Polyphaga
- Infraorder: Cucujiformia
- Superfamily: Curculionoidea
- Family: Curculionidae
- Tribe: Hyperini
- Genus: Donus; Guillaume Capiomont, 1868

Species
- Several, including: Donus antoinei Hoffmann, 1957; Donus bonnairei Hoffmann, 1955; Donus bonvouloiri Hoffmann, 1958; Donus elegans (Boheman, 1842); Donus etruscus Megerle; Donus pourtoyi Hoffmann, 1958; Donus setosus Megerle; Donus tessellatus Megerle; Donus tortuosus Hoffmann, 1959

Synonyms
- Neoglanis Alonso-Zarazaga & Lyal 1999; Glanis Jekel, 1864 nec Agassiz, 1857

Genus of beetles

Donus is a genus of true weevils in the tribe Hyperini.
