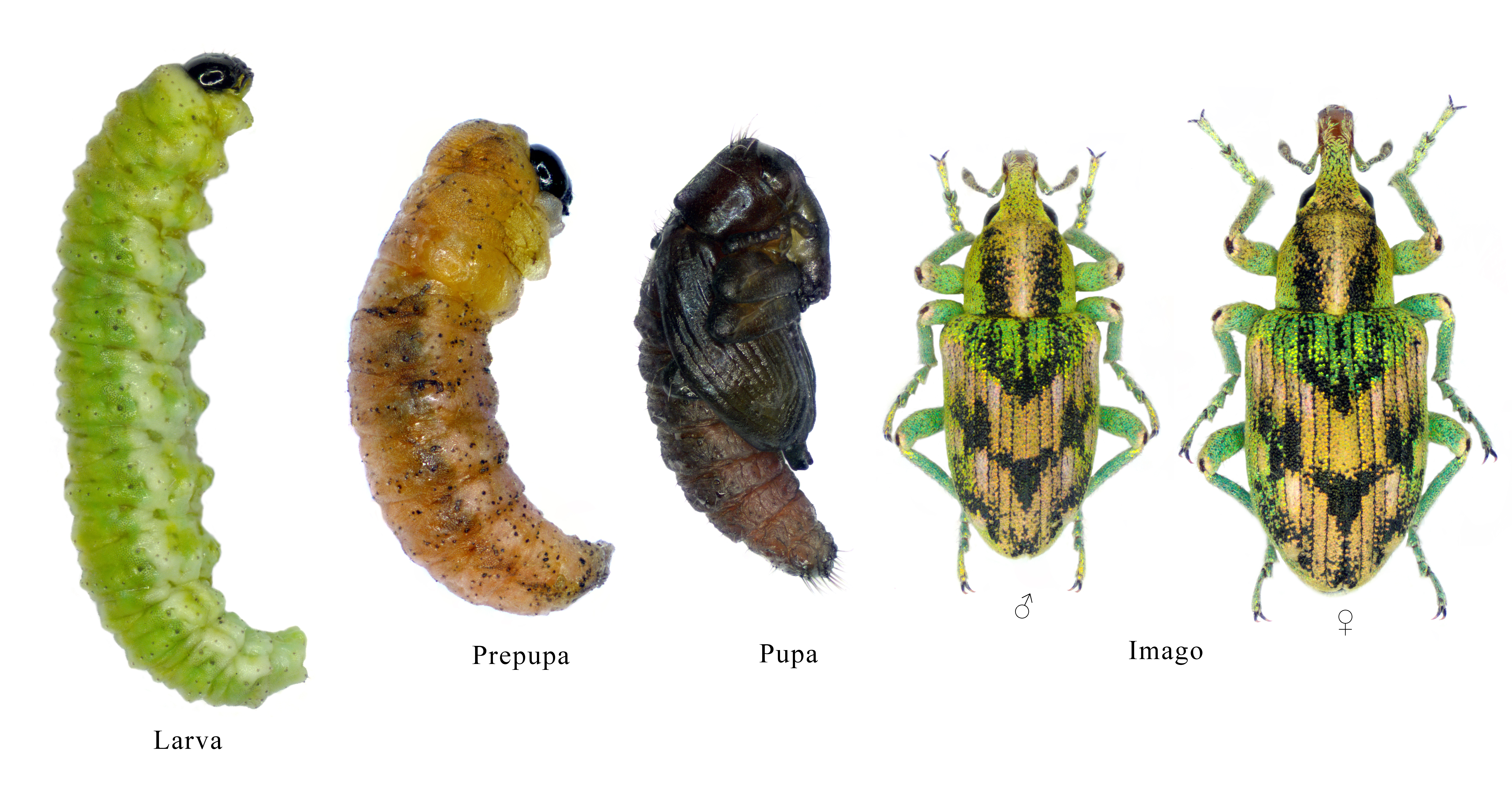
- Part of lifecyrcle of splendid tamarisk weevil (Coniatus (Bagoides) splendidulus Fabricius, 1781) (Hyperini).

Scientific classification
- Domain: Eukaryota
- Kingdom: Animalia
- Phylum: Arthropoda
- Class: Insecta
- Order: Coleoptera
- Suborder: Polyphaga
- Infraorder: Cucujiformia
- Family: Curculionidae
- Subfamily: Hyperinae; Marseul, 1863

Tribes
- Cepurini; Hyperini

Synonyms
- Phytonominae (Gistel, 1848)

= Hyperinae =

Subfamily of beetles

Hyperinae is a subfamily of true weevils. Species are sometimes placed in Molytinae.
