= List of fungi of South Africa – E =

This is an alphabetical list of fungal taxa as recorded from South Africa. Currently accepted names have been appended.

== Ec ==
Genus: Echidnodella Theiss. & Syd. 1918

- Echidnodella hypolepidis Doidge 1920accepted as Echidnodes hypolepidis (Doidge) Doidge, (1942)
- Echidnodella natalensis (Doidge) Arx, (1962), recorded as Echidnodes natalensis (Doidge) Doidge 1942

Genus: Echidnodes Theiss. & Syd. 1918

- Echidnodes acokantherae (Doidge) Doidge 1942, accepted as Lembosina acokantherae (Doidge) Arx [as 'acocantherae'],(1962)
- Echidnodes africana (Doidge) Doidge 1942
- Echidnodes curtisiae Doidge 1948
- Echidnodes durbana (Van der Byl) Hansf. 1946 accepted as Lembosina durbana (Van der Byl) Arx, (1962)
- Echidnodes hypolepidis (Doidge) Doidge 1942
- Echidnodes natalensis (Doidge) Doidge 1942 accepted as Echidnodella natalensis (Doidge) Arx, (1962)
- Echidnodes rhoina Doidge 1920 accepted as Lembosina rhoina (Doidge) Arx, (1962)
- Echidnodes transvaalensis Doidge 1948

Genus: Ectotrichophyton Castell. & Chalm. 1919 accepted as Trichophyton Malmsten, (1848)

- Ectotrichophyton mentagrophytes (C.P. Robin) Castell. & Chalm. 1919 accepted as Trichophyton mentagrophytes (C.P. Robin) Sabour., (1895)

== El ==
Genus: Elmerococcum Theiss. & Syd. 1915, accepted as Botryosphaeria Ces. & De Not., (1863)

- Elmerococcum peglerae (Pole-Evans) Doidge 1921

Genus: Elsinoë Racib. 1900

- Elsinoë ampelina Shear 1929
- Elsinoë fawcetti Bitanc. & Jenkins 1936
- Elsinoë poinsettiae Jenkins (sic) possibly (Jenkins & Ruehle) Rossman & W.C. Allen 2016
- Elsinoë pyri (Woron.) Jenkins 1932
- Elsinoë violae Jenkins (sic) probably (Massey & Jenkins) X.L. Fan & Crous 2017

== Em ==
Genus: Empusa Cohn 1855

- Empusa conglomerata (Sorokīn) Thaxt. 1888 accepted as Entomophaga conglomerata (Sorokīn) S. Keller, [1987]
- Empusa fresenii Nowak. 1886 accepted as Neozygites fresenii (Nowak.) Remaud. & S. Keller, (1980)
- Empusa grylli (Fresen.) Nowak. 1888 accepted as Entomophaga grylli (Fresen.) A. Batko, (1964)
- Empusa lecanii Zimm. 1901 accepted as Neozygites lecanii (Zimm.) Ben Ze'ev & R.G. Kenneth, (1987)
- Empusa muscae Cohn 1855 accepted as Entomophthora muscae (Cohn) Fresen., (1856)
- Empusa sp.

== En ==
Genus: Endocarpiscum Nyl. 1864 (Lichens)

- Endocarpiscum guepini (Delise) Nyl. 1864

Genus: Endocarpon Hedw. 1789

- Endocarpon crenatum Taylor 1847 accepted as Psora crenata (Taylor) Reinke, (1895)
- Endocarpon hepaticum Ach. 1809
- Endocarpon peltatum Taylor 1847
- Endocarpon pusillum Hedw. 1789
- Endocarpon speireum Taylor 1847
- Endocarpon vitellinum Spreng. 1820
- Endocarpon thunbergii (Ach.) Ach. 1803 accepted as Dermatiscum thunbergii (Ach.) Nyl., (1867)

Genus: Endodermophyton Castell. 1910 accepted as Trichophyton Malmsten, (1848)

- Endodermophyton africanum Doidge (sic) possibly C.W. Dodge 1935
- Endodermophyton sp.

Genus: Endodothella Theiss. & Syd. 1915 accepted as Phyllachora Nitschke ex Fuckel, (1870)

- Endodothella deightonii Syd. 1938 accepted as Stigmochora deightonii (Syd.) Arx, (1962)
- Endodothella natalensis Doidge 1921 accepted as Stigmochora natalensis (Doidge) Arx, (1962)
- Endodothella strelitziae (Cooke) Theiss. & Syd. 1915 accepted as Phyllachora strelitziae (Cooke) Sacc., (1883)

Order: Endomycetales Gäum. & C.W. Dodge 1928

Family: Endomycetaceae J. Schröt. 1893

Genus: Endophyllum Lév. 1826

- Endophyllum macowanii Pole-Evans 1909 [as macowani]

Genus: Endopyrenium Flot. 1855 accepted as Catapyrenium Flot., (1850)

- Endopyrenium peltatum (Taylor) Müll. Arg. 1888

Genus: Englerula Henn. 1904

- Englerula macarangae Henn. 1904
- Englerula popowiae Stevens.*

Genus: Englerulaster Höhn. 1910 accepted as Asterina Lév., (1845)

- Englerulaster gymnosporiae (Henn.) Theiss. 1918 accepted as Englera gymnosporiae (Henn.) F. Stevens, (1939)
- Englerulaster macowanianus (Thüm.) G. Arnaud 1918 accepted as Parenglerula macowaniana (Thüm.) Höhn., (1910)
- Englerulaster orbicularis (Berk. & M.A. Curtis) Höhn. 1910 accepted as Cryptomeliola orbicularis (Berk. & M.A. Curtis) S. Hughes & Piroz., (1997)
- Englerulaster popowiae Doidge 1920 accepted as Englera popowiae (Doidge) F. Stevens, (1939)

Genus: Enterographa Fée 1825 (Lichens)

- Enterographa capensis A. Massal. 1861, accepted as Chiodecton colensoi (A. Massal.) Müll. Arg., (1894)
- Enterographa galactina (Zahlbr.) Redinger 1938
- Enterographa vanderbylii (Zahlbr.) Redinger 1938
- Enterographa venosa (Pers.) A. Massal. 1860 accepted as Enterographa crassa (DC.) Fée, [1824]

Genus: Enterostigma Müll. Arg. 1885 accepted as Thelotrema Ach., (1803)

- Enterostigma compunctum (Ach.) Müll. Arg. 1885 accepted as Leucodecton compunctum (Ach.) A. Massal., [1859-1860]

Genus: Entoloma P. Kumm. 1871

- Entoloma erophilum (Fr.) P. Karst. 1879, accepted as Entoloma plebejum (Kalchbr.) Noordel., (1985)
- Entoloma lividum Quél. 1872 accepted as Entoloma sinuatum (Bull.) P. Kumm., (1871)
- Entoloma microcarpum (Berk. & Broome) Sacc. 1887 accepted as Termitomyces microcarpus (Berk. & Broome) R. Heim, (1942)
- Entoloma sagittiforme (Kalchbr. & Cooke) Sacc. [as 'sagittaeforme'] 1887, accepted as Termitomyces sagittiformis (Kalchbr. & Cooke) D.A. Reid [as 'sagittaeformis'], (1975)

Genus Entomophaga A. Batko 1964,

- Entomophaga conglomerata (Sorokīn) S. Keller, [1987] recorded as Empusa conglomerata (Sorokīn) Thaxt. 1888
- Entomophaga grylli (Fresen.) A. Batko, (1964) recorded as Empusa grylli (Fresen.) Nowak. 1888

Genus: Entomophthora Fresen. 1856

- Entomophthora aphidis H. Hoffm. 1858, accepted as Zoophthora aphidis (H. Hoffm.) A. Batko, (1964)
- Entomophthora apiculata (Thaxt.) M.A. Gust. 1965 accepted as Batkoa apiculata (Thaxt.) Humber, (1989)
- Entomophthora coronata (Costantin) Kevorkian 1937 accspted as Conidiobolus coronatus (Costantin) A. Batko, (1964) [1962]
- Entomophthora grylli Fresen. 1856
- Entomophthora megasperma (Cohn) Sacc. 1888 accepted as Tarichium megaspermum Cohn, (1875)
- Entomophthora muscae (Cohn) Fresen., (1856) recorded as Empusa muscae Cohn 1855
- Entomophthora sphaerosperma Fresen. 1856
- Entomophthora sp.

Order: Entomophthorales G. Winter 1880

Family: Entomophthoraceae A.B. Frank 1874

Genus: EntomosporiumcLév. 1857 accepted as Diplocarpon F.A. Wolf, (1912)

- Entomosporium maculatum Lév. 1856 accepted as Diplocarpon mespili (Sorauer) B. Sutton, (1980)

Genus: Entopeltis Höhn. 1910 accepted as Vizella Sacc., (1883)

- Entopeltis interrupta (G. Winter) Höhn. 1910, accepted as Vizella interrupta (G. Winter) S. Hughes, (1953)

Genus: Entyloma de Bary 1874

- Entyloma australe Speg. 1880
- Entyloma bidentis Henn. 1895
- Entyloma calendulae (Oudem.) de Bary 1874
- Entyloma dahliae Syd. & P. Syd. 1912
- Entyloma fuscum J. Schröt. 1877
- Entyloma oleandrae Henn. 1895
- Entyloma physalidis (Kalchbr. & Cooke) G. Winter 1883 accepted as Entyloma australe Speg., (1880)
- Entyloma zinniae Syd. 1935

== Ep ==
Family: Ephebaceae Th. Fr. 1861

Genus: Ephebe Fr. 1825

- Ephebe lanata (L.) Vain. 1888
- Ephebe pubescens (L.) Fr. 1826, accepted as Pseudephebe pubescens (L.) M. Choisy, (1930)

Genus: Ephelis Fr. 1849

- Ephelis viridans (Kalchbr. & Cooke) Sacc. 1884

Genus: Epichloë (Fr.) Tul. & C. Tul. 1865

- Epichloë cinerea Berk. & Broome 1873
- Epichloë eragrostis (sic) Pole Evans probably Epichloe eragrostidis Pole-Evans, (1917)
- Epichloë zahlbruckneriana Henn. 1900

Genus: Epicoccum Link 1816

- Epicoccum chrysanthemi du Plessis 1933
- Epicoccum granulatum Penz. 1882
- Epicoccum humicola (R.E. Buchanan) Sacc. 1931
- Epicoccum neglectum Desm. 1842
- Epicoccum nigrum Link 1816
- Epicoccum purpurascens Ehrenb. ex Schltdl. 1824 accepted as Epicoccum nigrum (1816)
- Epicoccum sp.

Genus: Epidermophyton Sabour. 1907

- Epidermophyton floccosum (Harz) Langeron & Miloch. 1930
- Epidermophyton interdigitale (Priestley) L. MacCarthy 1925 accepted as Trichophyton mentagrophytes (C.P. Robin) Sabour., (1895)
- Epidermophyton purpureum (H. Bang) C.W. Dodge 1935 accepted as Trichophyton purpureum H. Bang, (1910)
- Epidermophyton rubrum Castell. 1910 accepted as Trichophyton rubrum (Castell.) Sabour., (1911)

Genus: Epistigme Syd. 1924

- Epistigme nidulans Syd. 1924

Genus: Epochnium Link 1809 accepted as Monilinia Honey, (1928)

- Epochnium phyllogenum Kalchbr. & Cooke 1880

== Er ==
Family: Eremascaceae Engl. & E. Gilg 1924

Eremascaceae imperfectae C.W. Dodge 1935

Genus: Erikssonia Penz. & Sacc. 1898

- Erikssonia carissae Doidge 1948

Genus: Eriomycopsis Speg. 1910

- Eriomycopsis asterinae Hansf. 1942 accepted as Atractilina asterinae (Hansf.) Deighton & Piroz., (1972)
- Eriomycopsis bomplandi Speg. 1910
- Eriomycopsis flagellata Hansf. 1942
- Eriomycopsis meliolae Hansf. 1942
- Eriomycopsis minima Hansf. 1942 accepted as Rhytidenglerula minima (Hansf.) Arx, (1962)
- Eriomycopsis ugandae Hansf. 1942

Genus: Erostella (Sacc.) Sacc. 1906 accepted as Phaeoacremonium W. Gams, Crous & M.J. Wingf., (1996)

- Erostella quaternarioides Sacc.*

Family: Erysiphaceae Tul. & C. Tul. 1861

Genus: Erysiphe R. Hedw. ex DC. 1805

- Erysiphe aquilegiae DC. 1815
- Erysiphe brachystegiae Doidge 1948
- Erysiphe cichoracearum DC. 1805
- Erysiphe communis Link. (sic) possibly (Wallr.) Schltdl. 1824 accepted as Erysiphe cruciferarum Opiz ex L. Junell, (1967)
- Erysiphe cruciferarum Opiz ex L. Junell, (1967) recorded as Erysiphe communis Link. (sic) possibly (Wallr.) Schltdl. 1824
- Erysiphe graminis DC. 1815 accepted as Blumeria graminis (DC.) Speer, (1975)
- Erysiphe heraclei DC., (1815) recorded as Erysiphe umbelliferarum (Lév.) de Bary 1870,
- Erysiphe jatrophae Doidge 1948,
- Erysiphe martii Lév. 1851 accepted as Erysiphe trifolii Grev., (1824)
- Erysiphe nitida (Wallr.) Rabenh. 1844
- Erysiphe pisi DC. 1805
- Erysiphe polygoni DC. 1805
- Erysiphe trifolii Grev., (1824) recorded as Erysiphe martii Lév. 1851
- Erysiphe umbelliferarum (Lév.) de Bary 1870, accepted as Erysiphe heraclei DC., (1815)

== Eu ==
Subclass: Eubasidii*

Genus: EubelonisClem., (1909) accepted as Calycina Nees ex Gray, (1821)

- Eubelonis ocoteae Van der Byl 1926

Genus: Eucantharomyces Thaxt. 1895

- Eucantharomyces africanus Thaxt. 1900

Genus: Eudarluca Speg. 1908

- Eudarluca australis Speg. 1908

Genus: Eudimeriolum Speg. 1912

- Eudimeriolum gymnosporiae Hansf. 1946, accepted as Episphaerella gymnosporiae (Hansf.) Arx, (1962)

Genus: Eumitra*

- Eumitra implicita Stirt.*

Genus: Eupelte Syd. 1924

- Eupelte amicta Syd. 1924

Family: Eurotiaceae Clem. & Shear 1931

Genus: Eurotium Link 1809

- Eurotium herbariorum (Weber ex F.H. Wigg.) Link ex Nees 1816, accepted as Aspergillus glaucus (L.) Link, (1809)

Genus: Euryachora Fuckel 1870

- Euryachora maculiformis E.E. Nel 1942

Genus: Eutypella (Nitschke) Sacc. 1875

- Eutypella acacia Doidge 1941
- Eutypella citricola Syd. & P. Syd. 1909
- Eutypella doidgeae Syd. 1939
- Eutypella lycii Doidge 1941 accepted as Eutypella capensis Rappaz, (1987)
- Eutypella macowani Doidge 1941
- Eutypella stellulata (Fr.) Sacc. 1882

== Ev ==
Genus: Evernia Ach. 1809 (Lichens)

- Evernia chrysophthalma Flotow.*
- Evernia flavicans (Sw.) Fr. 1831 accepted as Teloschistes flavicans (Sw.) Norman, (1852)
- Evernia flavicans var. dealbata Flot. 1843

== Ex ==
Genus: Exidia Fr. 1822

- Exidia auricula-judae (Bull.) Fr. 1822 accepted as Auricularia auricula-judae (Bull.) Quél., (1886)
- Exidia caespitosa Lloyd 1915
- Exidia duthiei Lloyd 1915
- Exidia purpurea-cinerea MacOwan & Kalchbr. (sic)possibly Exidia purpureocinerea MacOwan 1882

Genus: Exoascus Fuckel 1860

- Exoascus deformans (Berk.) Fuckel 1870 accepted as Taphrina deformans (Berk.) Tul., (1866)

Family: Exobasidiaceae J. Schröt. 1888

Genus: Exobasidium Woronin 1867

- Exobasidium giseckiae Allesch. 1895
- Exobasidium hesperidum Maire 1917, [as hesperidium] accepted as Muribasidiospora hesperidum (Maire) Kamat & Rajendren, (1968)
- Exobasidium vaccinii (Fuckel) Woronin 1867
- Exobasidium vitis (Viala & G. Boyer) Prill. & Delacr. 1894 accepted as Aureobasidium pullulans (de Bary & Löwenthal) G. Arnaud, (1918)

Genus: Exosporium Link 1809

- Exosporium celastri Kalchbr. 1880 accepted as Stigmina celastri (Kalchbr.) M.B. Ellis, (1959)
- Exosporium palmivorum Sacc. 1898, accepted as Scolecostigmina palmivora (Sacc.) Kamal, (2010)

== See also ==
- List of bacteria of South Africa
- List of Oomycetes of South Africa
- List of slime moulds of South Africa
- List of fungi of South Africa
  - List of fungi of South Africa – A
  - List of fungi of South Africa – B
  - List of fungi of South Africa – C
  - List of fungi of South Africa – D
  - List of fungi of South Africa – E
  - List of fungi of South Africa – F
  - List of fungi of South Africa – G
  - List of fungi of South Africa – H
  - List of fungi of South Africa – I
  - List of fungi of South Africa – J
  - List of fungi of South Africa – K
  - List of fungi of South Africa – L
  - List of fungi of South Africa – M
  - List of fungi of South Africa – N
  - List of fungi of South Africa – O
  - List of fungi of South Africa – P
  - List of fungi of South Africa – Q
  - List of fungi of South Africa – R
  - List of fungi of South Africa – S
  - List of fungi of South Africa – T
  - List of fungi of South Africa – U
  - List of fungi of South Africa – V
  - List of fungi of South Africa – W
  - List of fungi of South Africa – X
  - List of fungi of South Africa – Y
  - List of fungi of South Africa – Z
