= List of Asterina species =

This is a list of the fungus species in the genus Asterina. Many are plant pathogens.

As of 27 August 2023, the GBIF lists up to 740 species, while Species Fungorum lists about 727 species (out of 931 records). About 1,085 species were accepted by Wijayawardene et al. in 2020.

This list of names, authors and dates is based on the Species Fungorum list.

== A ==
- Asterina aburiensis S. Hughes (1952)
- Asterina acalyphae Syd. (1925)
- Asterina achyrospermi Mibey (1996)
- Asterina acronychiae Hosag. & Goos (1996)
- Asterina acrotremae Hosag. & Chandrapr. ex Hosag. (2011)
- Asterina adeniae Hansf. (1945)
- Asterina adeniicola Hosag. & Kamar. (2006)
- Asterina adenostemmatis A.K. Kar & S.N. Ghosh (1987)
- Asterina advenula Syd. (1927)
- Asterina aemula Syd. (1927)
- Asterina africana (Van der Byl) Doidge (1942)
- Asterina afzeliae Mibey (1997)
- Asterina aganosmae Petr. (1931)
- Asterina aglaiae Hosag. (2006)
- Asterina alchorneae Syd. (1938)
- Asterina alchorneae-javanensis Hansf. (1954)
- Asterina alchorneicola Hansf. (1945)
- Asterina alloplecti T.A. Hofm. (2011)
- Asterina alpina Racib. (1900)
- Asterina altingiae B. Song (2003)
- Asterina amadelpha Syd. (1929)
- Asterina anacardii (R.W. Ryan) Hosag. & T.K. Abraham (2000)
- Asterina anamirtae Hosag. (1996)
- Asterina anisoptericola Hansf. (1949)
- Asterina annonicola Henn. (1902)
- Asterina anogeissi R.C. Rajak (1985)
- Asterina antidesmatis Petr. (1959)
- Asterina antioquensis (Toro) Garcés (1944)
- Asterina aphanes Petr. (1929)
- Asterina aporosae Hansf. (1954)
- Asterina aquilariae Ouyang & B. Song (1995)
- Asterina araliae M.S. Patil & A.B. Pawar (1989)
- Asterina ardisiae Hansf. (1954)
- Asterina ardisiicola Hosag. & Chandrapr. ex Hosag. (2011)
- Asterina arecacearum Hosag., T.K. Abraham & C.K. Biju (2001)
- Asterina aristolochiae Hosag., Jac. Thomas & D.K. Agarwal (2011)
- Asterina arkemibeyi Hosag., Sabeena & S.P. Mathew (2013)
- Asterina arnaudii R.W. Ryan (1924)
- Asterina artabotrydis Hansf. (1938)
- Asterina artocarpi Hosag. & Sabeena (2013)
- Asterina arxii-batistae J.L. Bezerra, Firmino & O.L. Pereira (2018)
- Asterina asclepiadis Hosag. & Goos (1996)
- Asterina asperulispora Gaillard (1897)
- Asterina aspidii (Henn.) Theiss. (1913)
- Asterina assimilis Syd. (1922)
- Asterina astroniae H.S. Yates (1917)
- Asterina atalantiae Hosag. & D.K. Agarwal (2003)
- Asterina aterrima Syd. (1938)
- Asterina atypica (Bat.) Hosag. & T.K. Abraham (2000)
- Asterina aucubae Henn. (1902)
- Asterina aulica Syd. (1938)
- Asterina australiensis Syd. (1937)
- Asterina averrhoae Hosag., Kamar. & K.P. Babu (2002)
- Asterina azarae Lév. (1845)

== B ==
- Asterina balakrishnanii Hosag. (1996)
- Asterina balansae (Speg.) Sacc. & Trotter (1913)
- Asterina balii Syd. & P. Syd. (1921)
- Asterina banguinensis H.S. Yates (1918)
- Asterina banisteriae Syd. (1929)
- Asterina baphiae S. Hughes (1952)
- Asterina barteriae Hansf. (1945)
- Asterina bataanensis Petr. (1931)
- Asterina beilschmiediae Bhise, C.R. Patil & Salunkhe (2015)
- Asterina belluciae Henn. (1904)
- Asterina benghalensis Mall & Aj. Kumar (2013)
- Asterina betonicae Hosag. & Goos (1996)
- Asterina blanda Syd. (1938)
- Asterina blumeae A.K. Kar & S.N. Ghosh (1987)
- Asterina boedijniana Hansf. (1954)
- Asterina borneensis Hansf. (1954)
- Asterina bosmanae Doidge (1942)
- Asterina bottomleyae Doidge (1942)
- Asterina brandisiae Hansf. (1948)
- Asterina brasiliana Speg. (1918)
- Asterina breyniae Syd. & P. Syd. (1917)
- Asterina breyniaecola Trotter (1926)
- Asterina brigadeirensis A.L. Firmino & O.L. Pereira (2023)
- Asterina bruceae B. Song (2003)
- Asterina buettneriae Theiss. (1913)
- Asterina bukobensis Hansf. (1946)
- Asterina byrsonimicola Henn. (1905)

== C ==
- Asterina camarinensis Syd. & P. Syd. (1914)
- Asterina cambodiana P. Joly (1965)
- Asterina cannonii Hosag. & C.K. Biju (2005)
- Asterina cansjerae R.W. Ryan (1928)
- Asterina cansjericola Hansf. & Thirum. (1948)
- Asterina canthii H.S. Yates (1918)
- Asterina canthii-dicocci Hosag. (2006)
- Asterina canthiigena Hosag., Archana & D.K. Agarwal (2007)
- Asterina capparicola Doidge (1942)
- Asterina capparis Syd., P. Syd. & E.J. Butler (1911)
- Asterina caralliae Lonkar, C.R. Patil & Salunkhe (2019)
- Asterina carbonacea Cooke (1880)
- Asterina caricarum Rehm (1895)
- Asterina caseariae Hansf. (1944)
- Asterina caseariae-esculentae Hosag. & T.K. Abraham (2000)
- Asterina caseariicola Hansf. (1907)
- Asterina cassiae Syd. & P. Syd. (1913)
- Asterina cassiicola Hosag. & Archana (2012)
- Asterina cassiigena Hosag., Thimm. & Sabeena (2013)
- Asterina castanopsidis B. Song & Ouyang (1996)
- Asterina celtidicola Henn. (1905)
- Asterina centroniae Petr. (1950)
- Asterina centropogonis R.E.D. Baker & W.T. Dale (1951)
- Asterina ceropegiae Hosag., H. Biju & Manojk. (2006)
- Asterina cerradensis Firmino, Vélez-Zambrano & Dianese (2019)
- Asterina cestricola (R.W. Ryan) Hosag. & T.K. Abraham (2000)
- Asterina champereiae Hansf. (1949)
- Asterina champereiicola B. Song & T.H. Li (2004)
- Asterina chloranthi Syd. (1931)
- Asterina chlorophorae Hansf. (1946)
- Asterina chrysophylli Henn. (1908)
- Asterina chrysophylligena Hosag., Thimm. & Sabeena (2013)
- Asterina chukrasiae Hosag. (2006)
- Asterina ciferriana Petr. (1932)
- Asterina cinnamomi Syd. (1923)
- Asterina cinnamomicola Hansf. (1946)
- Asterina cipadessae H.S. Yates (1917)
- Asterina circularis G. Winter (1886)
- Asterina cissi S. Hughes (1952)
- Asterina citriobati Hansf. (1957)
- Asterina clasterosporium S. Hughes (1953)
- Asterina clausenicola Doidge (1920)
- Asterina claviflori A.K. Kar & Maity (1970)
- Asterina clematidis Hansf. (1954)
- Asterina clemensiae Petr. (1931)
- Asterina clermontiae F. Stevens & R.W. Ryan (1925)
- Asterina clerodendricola Hansf. (1938)
- Asterina clusiacearum Hosag. & Thimm. (2012)
- Asterina coccolobae Ferd. & Winge (1908)
- Asterina coelocaryi Hansf. (1945)
- Asterina colliculosa Speg. (1889)
- Asterina columellicola W. Yamam. (1956)
- Asterina combreti Syd. & P. Syd. (1910)
- Asterina compsoneurae T.A. Hofm. (2011)
- Asterina concinna Syd. (1930)
- Asterina confertissima Syd. & P. Syd. (1916)
- Asterina congesta Cooke (1880)
- Asterina congregata Berk. & M.A. Curtis (1860)
- Asterina connectilis Syd. (1939)
- Asterina consimilis Höhn. (1909)
- Asterina consobrina Syd. (1927)
- Asterina contigua Syd. (1938)
- Asterina corallopoda Syd. (1939)
- Asterina cordylines Syd. (1937)
- Asterina coriacella Speg. (1889)
- Asterina costaricensis Syd. (1927)
- Asterina crebra Syd. & P. Syd. (1913)
- Asterina crotoniensis R.W. Ryan (1939)
- Asterina crotonis Syd. & P. Syd. (1916)
- Asterina cryptocaryicola Hosag., C.K. Biju & T.K. Abraham (2001)
- Asterina cupaniae Bat. (1953)
- Asterina cupheae Syd. (1927)
- Asterina cyathearum Racib. (1900)
- Asterina cylindrophora Syd. & P. Syd. (1917)
- Asterina cynanchi Hosag. & Shiburaj (2002)
- Asterina cynanchicola Hosag. & Archana (2012)
- Asterina cynometrae Hongsanan & K.D. Hyde (2016)
- Asterina cyrtandrae Hansf. (1954)

== D ==
- Asterina dallasica Petr. (1954)
- Asterina daphniphylli W. Yamam. (1956)
- Asterina daphniphyllicola B. Song (2004)
- Asterina davillae J.A. Stev. (1943)
- Asterina decipiens Syd. & P. Syd. (1912)
- Asterina decora Syd. (1937)
- Asterina decumana Syd. (1937)
- Asterina deightonii Syd. (1938)
- Asterina delicata Doidge (1920)
- Asterina delicatula Syd., P. Syd. & Bal (1921)
- Asterina delitescens Ellis & G. Martin (1883)
- Asterina dendroidea W. Yamam. (1956)
- Asterina denigrata Petr. (1929)
- Asterina densa Syd. & P. Syd. (1914)
- Asterina derridicola Hosag., Sabeena & S.P. Mathew (2013)
- Asterina derridis Henn. (1908)
- Asterina desmoticola Hosag. & Sabeena (2013)
- Asterina deviata Syd. (1939)
- Asterina dhivaharanii Hosag. & Nithyath. (2010)
- Asterina diaphorella Syd. & P. Syd. (1919)
- Asterina dichapetali Hansf. & Thirum. (1948)
- Asterina diclipterae W. Yamam. (1956)
- Asterina dictyolomatis Henn. (1904)
- Asterina dilabens Syd. & P. Syd. (1904)
- Asterina dilleniae Syd. & P. Syd. (1914)
- Asterina dinghuensis B. Song, T.H. Li & Y.H. Shen (2004)
- Asterina diospyri Hosag. & C.K. Pradeep (2001)
- Asterina dipholidis Petr. & Cif. (1930)
- Asterina diplocarpa Cooke (1882)
- Asterina diplopoda Syd. (1927)
- Asterina disciferae Hosag. (1996)
- Asterina disseminata Syd. (1939)
- Asterina distyliicola I. Hino & Katum. (1956)
- Asterina ditissima Syd. & P. Syd. (1917)
- Asterina dorsteniae Syd. (1927)
- Asterina doryphorae Hansf. (1954)
- Asterina drimycarpi A.K. Kar & Maity (1970)
- Asterina drimydicola Hansf. (1954)
- Asterina drypeticola Petr. & Cif. (1932)
- Asterina drypetigena Hosag. & Sony Thomas (2013)
- Asterina drypetis R.W. Ryan (1924)

== E ==
- Asterina echinospora Höhn. (1910)
- Asterina effusa Cooke & Massee (1887)
- Asterina ekmanii Petr. & Cif. (1932)
- Asterina elachista Syd. (1938)
- Asterina elaeagni (Syd. & P. Syd.) Syd. (1931)
- Asterina elaeocarpi Syd. & P. Syd. (1911)
- Asterina elaeocarpicola Hansf. (1954)
- Asterina elaeocarpigena Hosag., S.P. Mathew & D. Babu (2014)
- Asterina elaeocarpi-kobanmochii W. Yamam. (1957)
- Asterina elatostematis Hosag. & Goos (1996)
- Asterina elegans Doidge (1942)
- Asterina elmeri Syd. & P. Syd. (1911)
- Asterina embeliae Hansf. (1944)
- Asterina emciciana Hosag., P.J. Robin & Archana (2009)
- Asterina enicostematis Hosag. & Chandrapr. (2009)
- Asterina entebbeensis Hansf. (1946)
- Asterina eocenica Dilcher (1965)
- Asterina erebia Syd. (1927)
- Asterina erithalidis (Ellis & Everh.) Farl. (1905)
- Asterina erythropali Hansf. (1954)
- Asterina erythropalicola Hosag. & Goos (1996)
- Asterina escharoides Syd. & P. Syd. (1911)
- Asterina eugeniae-formosanae W. Yamam. (1957)
- Asterina euodiae Hansf. (1954)
- Asterina euodiicola W. Yamam. (1956)
- Asterina euonymi Hosag. & Goos (1994)
- Asterina eupatorii A.K. Kar & S.N. Ghosh (1987)
- Asterina eupomatiae (Henn.) Theiss. (1913)
- Asterina euryae B. Song (2004)
- Asterina excoecariae Doidge (1920)

== F ==
- Asterina fagarae H.S. Yates (1918)
- Asterina fawcettii R.W. Ryan (1924)
- Asterina ferruginosa Doidge (1920)
- Asterina fici-globosae Hansf. (1954)
- Asterina fieldiae Hansf. (1954)
- Asterina flacourtiacearum Hosag. & K. Ravik. (1996)
- Asterina flacourtiaceicola B. Song, T.H. Li & Hosag. (2003)
- Asterina flacourtiae Petr. (1931)
- Asterina fleuryae Doidge (1942)
- Asterina formosana W. Yamam. (1957)
- Asterina fragillissima Berk. (1855)
- Asterina fraseriana Syd. (1937)
- Asterina fuchsiae Syd. (1939)
- Asterina fumagina Dearn. & Barthol. (1917)
- Asterina funtumiae Syd. (1938)

== G ==
- Asterina gaiadendricola T.A. Hofm. (2008)
- Asterina gamsii Hosag. & C.K. Biju (2005)
- Asterina garciniae Hansf. (1946)
- Asterina garciniicola Ouyang & B. Song (1995)
- Asterina gardoquiae (Syd. & P. Syd.) Hosag. & T.K. Abraham (2000)
- Asterina geniospori (Hansf.) Hansf. (1941)
- Asterina geniostomaticola Hansf. (1954)
- Asterina geniostomatis Hansf. (1954)
- Asterina genipae R.W. Ryan (1924)
- Asterina gerbericola Doidge (1924)
- Asterina gesneriacearum (Henn.) Hongsanan & K.D. Hyde (2014)
- Asterina girardiniae Hosag. & C.K. Biju (2005)
- Asterina glycosmidigena Hosag. & Jac. Thomas (2010)
- Asterina glycosmidis Hosag. & C.K. Biju (2005)
- Asterina glyptopetali Hosag. & C.K. Biju (2005)
- Asterina gmelinae Sacc. (1916)
- Asterina gomphandrae Hosag. & C.K. Biju (2002)
- Asterina gonostegiae W. Yamam. (1956)
- Asterina goosii Hosag. & N.P. Balakr. (1996)
- Asterina gopalkrishnanii L.N. Nair & V.P. Kaul (1987)
- Asterina gordoniae Sabeena, H. Biju, Dhanusha & Shiburaj (2020)
- Asterina gouldiae F. Stevens & R.W. Ryan (1925)
- Asterina goyazensis Henn. (1895)
- Asterina grammocarpa Syd. & P. Syd. (1914)
- Asterina grandicarpa Mibey (1997)
- Asterina grewiae Cooke (1882)
- Asterina grisea Petr. (1950)
- Asterina guaranitica (Speg.) Speg. (1888)
- Asterina guianensis R.W. Ryan (1924)
- Asterina gymnemae Hosag. & Jac. Thomas (2010)
- Asterina gymnosporiae E. Castell. (1942)

== H ==
- Asterina hainanensis B. Song (2004)
- Asterina hakgalensis Hansf. (1947)
- Asterina hamata Syd. (1927)
- Asterina hamatula Cif. (1938)
- Asterina hansfordii Syd. (1938)
- Asterina hapala Syd. (1938)
- Asterina hederae Desm. (1859)
- Asterina heliciae W. Yamam. (1956)
- Asterina helicteris Ouyang & Y.X. Hu (1996)
- Asterina hemidesmi Hosag., Thimm. & Sabeena (2013)
- Asterina hendersonii Doidge (1920)
- Asterina henianii R.C. Verma, M.S. Tripathi & R.K. Chaudhary (1999)
- Asterina heterostemmatis W. Yamam. (1956)
- Asterina heterotropae Nakam. (1973)
- Asterina hians Syd. & P. Syd. (1916)
- Asterina hibisci (Doidge) Hosag. (2004)
- Asterina himantia (Pers.) Sacc. (1882)
- Asterina hippocrateae R.W. Ryan (1924)
- Asterina hodgsoniae B. Song & T.H. Li (2002)
- Asterina holarrhenae R.W. Ryan (1928)
- Asterina holocalycis Speg. (1912)
- Asterina homalii Syd. (1939)
- Asterina homaliicola S. Hughes (1952)
- Asterina homaliigena Hosag. & Thimm. (2012)
- Asterina homalomenae (J.M. Mend.) Hosag. & T.K. Abraham (2000)
- Asterina homonoiae Hosag. & Sabeena (2011)
- Asterina hopeae Hosag. & Kamar. (2002)
- Asterina hopeicola Hosag. & T.K. Abraham (1998)
- Asterina horsfieldiae Hansf. (1954)
- Asterina horsfieldiicola B. Song, T.H. Li & Hosag. (2003)
- Asterina hosagoudarii Bhise, C.R. Patil & Salunkhe (2015)
- Asterina huallagensis Henn. (1904)
- Asterina hughesii Hosag. & T.K. Abraham (2000)
- Asterina hugoniae Hosag., Sabeena & Riju (2011)
- Asterina hydnocarpi Hosag. & T.K. Abraham (1999)
- Asterina hydrangeae B. Song & Ouyang (1996)
- Asterina hydrocotyles Hosag. & C.K. Biju (2005)
- Asterina hyphaster Henn. (1902)
- Asterina hypophylla Berk. ex Theiss. (1912)
- Asterina hyptidicola Hosag. (2006)
- Asterina hyptidis (Rehm) Hosag. & T.K. Abraham (2000)
- Asterina hystrix Pat. & Har. (1900)

== I ==
- Asterina ilicicola W. Yamam. (1957)
- Asterina imbertiae Sabeena, H. Biju & Dhanusha (2021)
- Asterina incilis Syd. (1938)
- Asterina indecora Syd. (1927)
- Asterina indica Syd. & P. Syd. (1911)
- Asterina indodeightonii Vishnu, M.A. Khan & M. Bera ex R.K. Saxena & P.M. Kirk (2022)
- Asterina isothea Syd. (1927)

== J ==
- Asterina jacaratiae Theiss. (1916)
- Asterina jahnii Syd. (1930)
- Asterina jambolanae A.K. Kar & Maity (1970)
- Asterina japonica Theiss. (1913)
- Asterina jasmini Hansf. (1948)
- Asterina jasminicola H.S. Yates (1918)
- Asterina jasmini-subtrinervis W. Yamam. (1957)
- Asterina jaundeae S. Hughes (1953)

== K ==
- Asterina kampalensis Hansf. (1941)
- Asterina kannurensis Hosag., Archana, Khaleel & Ramya (2012)
- Asterina kauaiensis F. Stevens & R.W. Ryan (1925)
- Asterina kernii Toro (1925)
- Asterina killipii Dearn. & House (1925)
- Asterina knemae-attenuatae Hosag., T.K. Abraham & T.S. Nayar (1998)
- Asterina knysnae Doidge (1942)
- Asterina kodajadriensis Hosag., Sabeena & K. Ravik. (2012)
- Asterina kosciuskensis Selkirk (1975)
- Asterina kukkalensis Hosag., Dhivah. & Riju (2011)
- Asterina kusukusuensis W. Yamam. (1957)
- Asterina kwangensis Henn. (1907)

== L ==
- Asterina lactucina Syd. (1931)
- Asterina laevipodia M.L. Farr (1987)
- Asterina lafoensiae Bat. & Gayão (1953)
- Asterina lanceolati C.R. Patil, Bhise & S.C. Patil (2014)
- Asterina landolphiae Hansf. (1944)
- Asterina landolphiicola Hansf. (1945)
- Asterina lanneae Hosag. & Manojk. (2003)
- Asterina latifoliae C.R. Patil, Bhise & S.C. Patil (2014)
- Asterina lauracearum B. Song, T.H. Li & Y.H. Shen (2003)
- Asterina lawsoniae Henn. & E. Nyman (1899)
- Asterina lawsoniicola B. Song (2002)
- Asterina laxiuscula Syd. & P. Syd. (1913)
- Asterina leeae S. Hughes (1952)
- Asterina leonensis Syd. (1938)
- Asterina leopoldina Rehm (1907)
- Asterina lepianthis (Hosag., M.P. Balakr. & Goos) Hosag. (2002)
- Asterina leptalea Syd. (1931)
- Asterina leucadis Hosag. & P.J. Robin (2011)
- Asterina leveillana Rehm (1907)
- Asterina libertiae Syd. & P. Syd. (1904)
- Asterina ligustricola Hosag. & Kamar. (2004)
- Asterina ligustrinae (Bat. & Peres) S. Hughes (1987)
- Asterina linderae Hansf. (1948)
- Asterina liparidis Racib. (1913)
- Asterina litseae H.S. Yates (1918)
- Asterina litseae-ligustrinae Hosag., N.P. Balakr. & Goos (1996)
- Asterina litseae-verticillatae B. Song (2003)
- Asterina lobata Syd. & P. Syd. (1912)
- Asterina lobeliae F. Stevens & R.W. Ryan (1925)
- Asterina lobeliicola Hosag. & T.K. Abraham (2000)
- Asterina lobulata W. Yamam. (1957)
- Asterina lobulifera Syd. & P. Syd. (1914)
- Asterina loeseneriellae Hosag. & Goos (1996)
- Asterina lopoensis A.L. Firmino & O.L. Pereira (2023)
- Asterina loranthacearum Rehm (1907)
- Asterina loranthicola Syd. & P. Syd. (1914)
- Asterina loranthigena Hosag., D.K. Agarwal, H. Biju & Archana (2006)
- Asterina loranthi-rhododendricolae W. Yamam. (1957)
- Asterina loropetali B. Song (2003)
- Asterina lucida Bat. (1953)
- Asterina lycianthis Hosag. & T.K. Abraham (1997)

== M ==
- Asterina mabae M.S. Patil & A.B. Pawar (1989)
- Asterina macarangae Hansf. (1947)
- Asterina machili Katum. (1979)
- Asterina madikeriensis Hosag. (2006)
- Asterina maeruaicola M.K. Moinuddin, Bagyan. & Jac. Thomas (2016)
- Asterina magnoliae X.Y. Zeng, T.C. Wen & K.D. Hyde (2018)
- Asterina mahoniae Keissl. (1924)
- Asterina malaisiae Syd. (1931)
- Asterina malleae Hansf. (1955)
- Asterina malloti Sawada & W. Yamam. (1959)
- Asterina malloti-apeltae B. Song (2004)
- Asterina malloticola Hosag., Kamar. & G. Rajkumar (2003)
- Asterina mallotigena Hosag. & Sabeena (2012)
- Asterina malvacearum Firmino, Vélez-Zambrano & Dianese (2019)
- Asterina mananthavadiensis Hosag. & Sabeena (2013)
- Asterina mandaquiensis Henn. (1908)
- Asterina manglietiae B. Song & Ouyang (2001)
- Asterina manihotis Syd. (1939)
- Asterina mappiae Petr. & Cif. (1930)
- Asterina marginalis Petr. (1931)
- Asterina markhamiae Hansf. (1955)
- Asterina marmellensis (Henn.) Theiss. (1913)
- Asterina mascagniae Petr. (1947)
- Asterina mate Speg. (1908)
- Asterina megalosperma Speg. (1908)
- Asterina melanomera Syd. & P. Syd. (1917)
- Asterina melanotes Syd. (1929)
- Asterina melastomacearum R.W. Ryan (1924)
- Asterina melastomatacearum (Henn.) Theiss. (1913)
- Asterina melastomaticola Hansf. (1954)
- Asterina melastomatis Lév. (1845)
- Asterina melastomatis-candidi W. Yamam. (1957)
- Asterina melicopicola Hosag. & T.K. Abraham (1997)
- Asterina meliosmae W. Yamam. (1956)
- Asterina meliosmicola Petr. & Cif. (1932)
- Asterina memecyli R.W. Ryan (1928)
- Asterina memorae Henn. (1904)
- Asterina menispermacearum Petr. (1959)
- Asterina mexicana Ellis & Everh. (1900)
- Asterina micheliae Hansf. (1947)
- Asterina micheliicola B. Song, T.H. Li & Y.H. Shen (2001)
- Asterina micheliifolia Hosag. & Riju (2011)
- Asterina micheliigena Hosag. & Riju (2011)
- Asterina miconiae Theiss. (1913)
- Asterina miconiicola R.W. Ryan (1924)
- Asterina microchita Syd. (1939)
- Asterina microcosi B. Song (2003)
- Asterina microspora W. Yamam. (1975)
- Asterina microtheca Pat. (1902)
- Asterina microtropidicola Hosag., C.K. Biju & D.K. Agarwal (2002)
- Asterina microtropidis Hosag., N.P. Balakr. & Goos (1996)
- Asterina miliusae Hosag. & C.K. Biju (2004)
- Asterina millettiae Hosag., Archana, Kamar. & Jose (2011)
- Asterina mimusopicola Hosag., Sabeena & D.K. Agarwal (2009)
- Asterina mimusopis Hansf. (1957)
- Asterina mioconsobrina Vishnu, M.A. Khan & M. Bera ex R.K. Saxena & P.M. Kirk (2022)
- Asterina miosphaerelloides Vishnu, M.A. Khan & M. Bera ex R.K. Saxena & P.M. Kirk (2022)
- Asterina mischocarpi Ouyang & Y.X. Hu (1996)
- Asterina mitrariae Syd. (1932)
- Asterina mitteriana Syd. (1937)
- Asterina momordicae H.S. Yates (1918)
- Asterina monanthotaxis Mibey (1997)
- Asterina morellae Hosag., C.K. Biju & T.K. Abraham (2001)
- Asterina mulleri J.A. Stev. (1943)
- Asterina multiplex Rehm (1907)
- Asterina munnarensis Hosag. (2012)
- Asterina murrayae Hansf. (1947)
- Asterina murrayicola Hosag. & Sabeena (2012)
- Asterina myrciae R.W. Ryan (1924)
- Asterina myriantha Syd. (1935)
- Asterina myristicacearum Hosag. & Sabeena (2011)
- Asterina myristicae Hosag. & Sabeena (2011)
- Asterina myrsinacearum B. Song (2004)
- Asterina myrsines A.K. Kar & Maity (1970)
- Asterina myrtacearum Bhise & C.R. Patil (2014)
- Asterina mysorensis Hansf. & Thirum. (1948)

== N ==
- Asterina naraveliae Hosag., C.K. Biju & D.K. Agarwal (2002)
- Asterina natalensis Doidge (1920)
- Asterina natalitia Doidge (1942)
- Asterina natsiati A.K. Kar & Maity (1970)
- Asterina negeriana Syd. & P. Syd. (1904)
- Asterina neocombreticola Vishnu, M.A. Khan & M. Bera ex R.K. Saxena & P.M. Kirk (2022)
- Asterina neoelaeocarpi Vishnu, M.A. Khan & M. Bera ex R.K. Saxena & P.M. Kirk (2022)
- Asterina neolitseae H.S. Yates (1918)
- Asterina neolitseicola Hosag., C.K. Biju & T.K. Abraham (2001)
- Asterina nodosa Doidge (1942)
- Asterina nodosaria Dilcher (1965)
- Asterina nodulifera Syd. & P. Syd. (1914)
- Asterina nodulosa Speg. (1889)
- Asterina nothopegiae R.W. Ryan (1928)
- Asterina nyanzae Hansf. (1938)
- Asterina nycticaliae H.S. Yates (1917)

== O ==
- Asterina ocotearum Petr. & Cif. (1932)
- Asterina olacicola Hansf. (1947)
- Asterina olacis B. Song (2003)
- Asterina oligocarpa Syd. & P. Syd. (1914)
- Asterina oligopoda Syd. (1930)
- Asterina omphaleae Petr. (1948)
- Asterina oncinotidis Doidge (1942)
- Asterina opaca Syd. & P. Syd. (1912)
- Asterina opiliae Mibey (1997)
- Asterina opposita Syd. & P. Syd. (1913)
- Asterina oppositipodia Rahayu & I.H. Parbery (1991)
- Asterina opulenta (Henn.) Sacc. & D. Sacc. (1905)
- Asterina orbicularis Berk. & M.A. Curtis (1875)
- Asterina oreocnidecola Hosag., N.P. Balakr. & Goos (1996)
- Asterina oreocnidegena Hosag. (2006)
- Asterina oritis Hansf. (1954)
- Asterina orthosticha Syd. (1930)
- Asterina oxyanthi Doidge (1942)
- Asterina oxyceri Bhise, C.R. Patil & Salunkhe (2015)

== P ==
- Asterina pachynema Syd. (1939)
- Asterina palaquii Hosag. & Goos (1996)
- Asterina pandae Hansf. (1945)
- Asterina pandicola Hansf. (1945)
- Asterina papillata Syd. & P. Syd. (1916)
- Asterina papuensis Hansf. (1957)
- Asterina paramacrolobii Mibey (1997)
- Asterina parsonsiae Hosag. (2006)
- Asterina pasaniae Henn. (1900)
- Asterina passiflorae (Henn.) Sacc. & D. Sacc. (1905)
- Asterina passifloricola R.W. Ryan (1924)
- Asterina pavoniae Werderm. (1923)
- Asterina peglerae Doidge (1920)
- Asterina pellioniae Katum. (1986)
- Asterina pemphidioides Cooke (1876)
- Asterina pentaphylacis B. Song (2002)
- Asterina perpusilla Syd. & P. Syd. (1916)
- Asterina perseigena Hosag. & Divya (2013)
- Asterina phaleriae J.M. Mend. (1932)
- Asterina phenacis Syd. (1927)
- Asterina phlogacanthi A.K. Kar & S.N. Ghosh (1987)
- Asterina phoebes Syd. (1927)
- Asterina phoebes-costaricanae Hongsanan & K.D. Hyde (2017)
- Asterina phoebicola B. Song, T.H. Li & Hosag. (2003)
- Asterina phoebigena Hosag., Dhivah. & Nithyath. (2012)
- Asterina phoradendricola J.A. Stev. & Pollack (1946)
- Asterina phyllanthi-beddomei Hosag., Jac. Thomas & D.K. Agarwal (2011)
- Asterina phyllanthicola Suj. Singh (1980)
- Asterina phyllanthigena Hosag. (2004)
- Asterina phyllostegiae F. Stevens & R.W. Ryan (1925)
- Asterina physalidis Hosag. & Archana (2012)
- Asterina piperina Syd. & P. Syd. (1917)
- Asterina piperis H.S. Yates (1918)
- Asterina pipturi Syd. & P. Syd. (1916)
- Asterina pittospori Hansf. (1954)
- Asterina planchonellae Hansf. (1954)
- Asterina platypoda Syd. & P. Syd. (1917)
- Asterina plectranthi Hosag., Manojk. & H. Biju (2005)
- Asterina plectroniae J.M. Mend. (1932)
- Asterina plectroniaecola J.M. Mend. (1932)
- Asterina pleioceratis S. Hughes (1953)
- Asterina pliniae Cif. (1957)
- Asterina pluripora R.W. Ryan (1928)
- Asterina pogostemonis Petr. (1959)
- Asterina polygalae Hosag., Dhivah. & Nithyath. (2010)
- Asterina polyloba Syd. (1937)
- Asterina polythyria Doidge (1920)
- Asterina pongalaparensis Hosag., C.K. Biju & T.K. Abraham (2001)
- Asterina porrigens Syd. & P. Syd. (1912)
- Asterina porriginosa Syd. & P. Syd. (1912)
- Asterina portoricensis R.W. Ryan (1924)
- Asterina pouteriae B. Song (2003)
- Asterina pouzolziae Petr. (1954)
- Asterina pouzolziicola Hosag. & T.K. Abraham (2000)
- Asterina prataprajii Hosag., P.J. Robin & Archana (2010)
- Asterina presaracae Vishnu, M.A. Khan & M. Bera ex R.K. Saxena & P.M. Kirk (2022)
- Asterina prosopidis (Ellis & Everh.) Farl. (1905)
- Asterina psidii R.W. Ryan (1924)
- Asterina psychotriae R.W. Ryan (1924)
- Asterina psychotriicola Hosag. & Archana (2009)
- Asterina pterygopodii Hansf. (1945)
- Asterina puellaris Syd. (1937)
- Asterina pulchella Petr. (1929)
- Asterina pusilla Syd. & P. Syd. (1913)
- Asterina pycnanthi Hansf. (1938)

== Q ==
- Asterina quarta Racib. (1913)
- Asterina queenslandica Rahayu & I.H. Parbery (1991)

== R ==
- Asterina racemosae R.W. Ryan (1924)
- Asterina radiofissilis (Sacc.) Theiss. (1912)
- Asterina ramonensis Syd. (1927)
- Asterina ramosiana Hosag. & T.K. Abraham (2000)
- Asterina ramosii H.S. Yates (1918)
- Asterina ramuligera (Syd. & P. Syd.) Petr. (1947)
- Asterina randiae-benthamianae Hansf. (1957)
- Asterina recisa Syd. (1937)
- Asterina reclinata Syd. (1937)
- Asterina rhabdodendri Syd. & P. Syd. (1916)
- Asterina rhamni A.K. Kar & S.N. Ghosh (1987)
- Asterina rhodomyrti Hosag., H. Biju & Manojk. (2006)
- Asterina rickii Theiss. (1913)
- Asterina rizalensis Hansf. (1949)
- Asterina rizalica Petr. (1959)
- Asterina robusta Doidge (1920)
- Asterina rogergoosii B. Song (2002)
- Asterina rubiacearum M.R. Bhise, C.R. Patil, C.B. Salunkhe & S.V. Kambhar (2021)
- Asterina rufoviolascens Henn. (1904)

== S ==
- Asterina sabalicola Earle (1900)
- Asterina sabiacearum Hosag. & Goos (1994)
- Asterina sabiana A.K. Kar & S.N. Ghosh (1987)
- Asterina saccardoana Theiss. (1913)
- Asterina saccopetali Tilak & U.K. Kulk. (1977)
- Asterina samaderae Hosag. & Manojk. (2003)
- Asterina samanensis Cif. (1938)
- Asterina samoensis (Henn.) Theiss. (1919)
- Asterina sandowayensis Thaung (1977)
- Asterina saniculae Doidge (1942)
- Asterina saniculicola Hansf. (1954)
- Asterina saracae Hosag., T.K. Abraham & J.L. Crane (1998)
- Asterina sarcandrae Hosag. & Kamar. (2006)
- Asterina sawadae B. Song (2004)
- Asterina scaberrima Syd. (1938)
- Asterina schimae Hosag., Jac. Thomas & P.J. Robin (2009)
- Asterina schlechteriana Syd. (1927)
- Asterina schlegeliae T.A. Hofm. (2008)
- Asterina scitula Syd. (1938)
- Asterina scleropyri Hosag. & Chandrapr. (2009)
- Asterina scolopiae Doidge (1922)
- Asterina scrobiculata W. Yamam. (1957)
- Asterina scruposa Syd. (1938)
- Asterina scutullariae Hosag., Dhivah. & Nithyath. (2012)
- Asterina secamonicola Doidge (1927)
- Asterina serrensis Henn. (1908)
- Asterina shastavunadaensis Hosag. & Sabeena (2013)
- Asterina shimbaensis Mibey (1997)
- Asterina sidae Earle (1905)
- Asterina sideroxyli Hansf. (1954)
- Asterina sidicola R.W. Ryan (1924)
- Asterina simillima Syd. & P. Syd. (1917)
- Asterina singaporensis Syd. & P. Syd. (1921)
- Asterina sinsuieiensis W. Yamam. (1957)
- Asterina siphocampyli Syd. (1939)
- Asterina sodalis Syd. (1928)
- Asterina solanacearum Garcés (1944)
- Asterina solanicola Berk. & M.A. Curtis (1868)
- Asterina solanicoloides Rehm (1896)
- Asterina songii Hosag. (2012)
- Asterina spathodeae Hansf. (1947)
- Asterina spectabilis Syd. (1922)
- Asterina sphaerotheca P. Karst. & Roum. (1890)
- Asterina spinosa (J.M. Mend.) Hosag. & T.K. Abraham (2000)
- Asterina spissa Syd. & P. Syd. (1911)
- Asterina sponiae Racib. (1900)
- Asterina stauntoniae W. Yamam. (1957)
- Asterina stipitipodia M.L. Farr (1987)
- Asterina stixis B. Song, T.H. Li & Hosag. (2003)
- Asterina streptocarpi Doidge (1924)
- Asterina strophanthi Henn. (1905)
- Asterina styracina Syd. (1927)
- Asterina subcylindracea W. Yamam. (1957)
- Asterina subglobulifera Höhn. (1920)
- Asterina subinermis Syd. & P. Syd. (1913)
- Asterina sublibera Berk. (1855)
- Asterina submegas (Henn.) Hansf. (1949)
- Asterina suttoniae F. Stevens & R.W. Ryan (1925)
- Asterina suttonii Hosag. & C.K. Biju (2004)
- Asterina sydowiana R.W. Ryan (1924)
- Asterina syzygii Doidge (1942)

== T ==
- Asterina tabernaemontanae (Syd.) Hongsanan & K.D. Hyde (2014)
- Asterina tacsoniae Pat. (1893)
- Asterina talacauveriana Hosag. (2006)
- Asterina tantalina Petr. (1953)
- Asterina tarlacensis Petr. (1959)
- Asterina tayabensis H.S. Yates (1917)
- Asterina tenella Cooke (1885)
- Asterina tertia Racib. (1913)
- Asterina tetracerae Syd. (1931)
- Asterina tetracericola B. Song, T.H. Li & F.W. Xing (2004)
- Asterina tetrazygiae R.W. Ryan (1924)
- Asterina tetrazygiicola Y.M. Ahn & J.L. Crane (2004)
- Asterina theae W. Yamam. (1957)
- Asterina theissenii R.W. Ryan (1924)
- Asterina thevalakkaraensis Hosag. & Bindu (2013)
- Asterina thotteae Hosag. & Hanlin (1995)
- Asterina thunbergiicola Hansf. (1945)
- Asterina thylachii Mibey (1997)
- Asterina tinosporae Hansf. (1954)
- Asterina toddalae A.K. Kar & S.N. Ghosh (1987)
- Asterina toddaliicola Hosag., D.K. Agarwal, H. Biju & Archana (2006)
- Asterina tonduzii (Speg.) Syd. (1927)
- Asterina toroi Hosag. & T.K. Abraham (2000)
- Asterina torulosa Berk. (1855)
- Asterina toxocarpi Hosag. & C.K. Biju (2005)
- Asterina trachycarpa Syd. & P. Syd. (1912)
- Asterina tragiae S. Hughes (1952)
- Asterina transiens Theiss. (1913)
- Asterina travancorensis Syd. & P. Syd. (1915)
- Asterina trichiliae Doidge (1920)
- Asterina trichosanthis B. Song & Ouyang (2003)
- Asterina triloba Earle (1905)
- Asterina triumfettae (G. Arnaud) F. Stevens (1939)
- Asterina triumfetticola W. Yamam. (1957)
- Asterina tropicalis Speg. (1918)
- Asterina tubocapsici Sawada & W. Yamam. (1959)
- Asterina turneracearum Cif. (1954)
- Asterina turnerae Henn. (1904)
- Asterina turraeae Hansf. (1944)
- Asterina tylophorae-indicae Hosag., H. Biju & Manojk. (2006)
- Asterina typhospora Maire (1908)

== U ==
- Asterina ugandensis Syd. (1937)
- Asterina uncinata Doidge (1920)
- Asterina undulata Doidge (1920)
- Asterina urerae Hansf. (1945)
- Asterina uribei Toro (1930)
- Asterina ushae Hosag., Thimm. & Archana (2013)
- Asterina usteri Maire (1908)
- Asterina uvariae Hansf. (1946)
- Asterina uvariae-microcarpae B. Song, T.H. Li & J.Q. Liang (2002)
- Asterina uvariicola Hansf. (1945)

== V ==
- Asterina vagans Speg. (1888)
- Asterina valida (Speg.) Sacc. & Trotter (1913)
- Asterina vanderbijlii Werderm. (1923)
- Asterina venezuelana Syd. (1930)
- Asterina venustula Syd. (1922)
- Asterina vepridis Doidge (1942)
- Asterina verae-crucis Theiss. (1914)
- Asterina veronicae (Lib.) Cooke (1877)
- Asterina versipoda R.W. Ryan (1924)
- Asterina viburnicola Hosag., Dhivah. & Nithyath. (2012)
- Asterina violae Henn. (1902)
- Asterina virescens Speg. (1908)
- Asterina visci Hosag. (2002)
- Asterina vitacearum Hosag., Thimm. & Sabeena (2013)
- Asterina viticola A.K. Kar & S.N. Ghosh (1987)

== W ==
- Asterina weinmanniae Syd. (1939)
- Asterina wingfieldii Hosag., N.P. Balakr. & Goos (1996)
- Asterina woodfordiae V.P. Sahni (1964)
- Asterina woodiana (Doidge) Doidge (1942)
- Asterina woodii Doidge (1942)
- Asterina wrightiae Syd. (1931)

== X ==
- Asterina xanthogloea Syd. (1938)
- Asterina xumenensis Doidge (1942)
- Asterina xyliae Hosag. (2013)
- Asterina xylosmae J.M. Mend. (1932)
- Asterina xymalodicola Hansf. (1945)
- Asterina xymalodis Hansf. (1945)

== Y ==
- Asterina yakusimensis Katum. (1975)
- Asterina yamamotoicola Hosag. & T.K. Abraham (2000)
- Asterina yoshinagae Henn. (1902)
- Asterina yoshinoi Katum. (1975)

== Z ==
- Asterina zanthoxyli W. Yamam. (1957)
