= Symphaster =

Scientific classification
- Kingdom: Fungi
- Division: Ascomycota
- Class: Dothideomycetes
- Order: Asterinales
- Family: Asterinaceae
- Genus: Symphaster; Theiss. & Syd.

Type species
- Symphaster gesneraceae (Henn.) Theiss. & Syd.

Species
- Symphaster areolata Symphaster gesneraceae

Genus of fungi

Symphaster is a genus of fungi in the Asterinaceae family. The relationship of this taxon to other taxa within the class is unknown (incertae sedis), and it has not yet been placed with certainty into any order.
