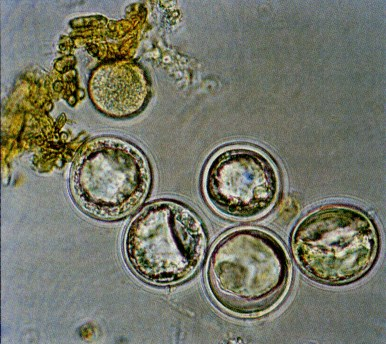
- Azygospores

Scientific classification
- Domain: Eukaryota
- Kingdom: Fungi
- Division: Entomophthoromycota
- Class: Entomophthoromycetes
- Order: Entomophthorales
- Family: Entomophthoraceae
- Genus: Entomophaga
- Species: E. maimaiga

Binomial name
- Entomophaga maimaiga Humber, Shimazu, and R.S. Soper (1988)

= Entomophaga maimaiga =

Species of fungus

Entomophaga maimaiga is a Japanese fungus which has shown striking success in managing spongy moth populations in North America.

== Etymology ==
Maimaiga is the Japanese name for the spongy moth.

== History ==
In 1908, shortly after classical efforts began to control spongy moth populations, North American researchers studied cadavers of Japanese spongy moths which had been killed by an entomophthoralean fungus. The fungus was released in the Boston area between 1910 and 1911. By 1912, they summarized their work, stating that extensive releases had never established this fungal pathogen, which they referred to as "gypsy fungus".

In the early 1980s, another attempt was made to introduce Entomophaga maimaiga into the wild. They obtained the sample from the western coast of Honshu. The fungus was determined to belong to the genus Entomophaga in the fungal order Entomophthorales and was given the name maimaiga based on geographical distribution.

In 1985 and 1986 were made small-scale releases of laboratory spongy moth larvae injected with fungal cells. The locations were New York State and Shenandoah National Park respectively. At the time these releases were not considered to be successful.

In 1989, cadavers of spongy moths found hanging on tree trunks revealed large resting spores characteristic of entomophthoralean fungi. The fungus found appeared to be the same species as released in 1910, 1911, 1985 and 1986.

The fungus spread across spongy moth populations over the next several years.

== Method of dispersion ==
The fungus spreads through aerial dispersion of actively ejected asexual spores from cadavers of spongy moth larvae it has killed. It can also be spread unwittingly by humans.

The fungus persists in the top layer of soil as resting spores. These have been shown to persist for at least 11 or 12 years, probably longer.

== Effect on spongy moths ==
The fungus causes high levels of infection among spongy moths in both low and high density populations, leading to population crashes. Early instars of infected moths typically eject conidia when they die in tree canopies, further infecting later instars containing spores of the fungus but no outward fungal growth.

== Effect on non-target Lepidoptera ==
Entomophaga maimaiga can only potentially affect lepidopteran larvae that are present in the spring, when spongy moth larvae are present. 78 species which fit this criterion were tested. Only about one-third were able to be infected under optimal conditions. Infection was only consistently high among three species of tussock moths and one colony of a hawk moth. However, field studies showed that rates achieved in the laboratory are far higher than found in the field. Overall the pathogen is considered highly host specific.
