= Morenoina =

Scientific classification
- Kingdom: Fungi
- Division: Ascomycota
- Class: Dothideomycetes
- Order: Asterinales
- Family: Asterinaceae
- Genus: Morenoina; Theiss.

Type species
- 'Morenoina antarctica (Speg.) Theiss.

Genus of fungi

Morenoina is a genus of fungi in the Asterinaceae family. The relationship of this taxon to other taxa within the class is unknown (incertae sedis), and it has not yet been placed with certainty into any order.

== Species ==
As accepted by Species Fungorum;

- Morenoina aframomi (Hansf.) Arx (1962)
- Morenoina antarctica (Speg.) Theiss. (1913)
- Morenoina arundinariae J.P. Ellis (1980)
- Morenoina australis (Speg.) Theiss. (1913)
- Morenoina azorica Dennis & Spooner (1977)
- Morenoina byrsonimae Bat. (1953)
- Morenoina calamicola S. Konta & K.D. Hyde (2017)
- Morenoina chamaecyparidis J.P. Ellis (1980)
- Morenoina clarkii J.P. Ellis (1980)
- Morenoina dracaenae Doidge (1948)
- Morenoina epilobii (Lib.) E. Müll. & Arx (1962)
- Morenoina festucae (Lib.) J.P. Ellis (1980)
- Morenoina fimbriata J.P. Ellis (1980)
- Morenoina graphoides (Sacc. & Berl.) Theiss. (1913)
- Morenoina inaequalis Maubl. & G. Arnaud (1918)
- Morenoina lucens (Harkn.) Theiss. (1913)
- Morenoina microscopica (Speg.) Theiss. (1913)
- Morenoina minuta J.P. Ellis (1980)
- Morenoina palmicola J. Fröhl., K.D. Hyde & Joanne E. Taylor (2000)
- Morenoina paludosa J.P. Ellis (1980)
- Morenoina parvula P.F. Cannon (1986)
- Morenoina phragmitis J.P. Ellis (1980)
- Morenoina pteridiicola J.P. Ellis (1984)
- Morenoina rhododendri J.P. Ellis (1980)
- Morenoina selaginellae M.L. Farr (1968)
- Morenoina websteri J.P. Ellis (1980)

Former species:

- M. africana Doidge (1920) = Echidnodella africana Asterinaceae
- M. serpens (Pat.) Theiss. (1913) = Echidnodes serpens Asterinaceae
