= Platypeltella angustispora =

Scientific classification
- Kingdom: Fungi
- Division: Ascomycota
- Class: Dothideomycetes
- Order: Asterinales
- Family: Asterinaceae
- Genus: Platypeltella
- Species: P. angustispora

Binomial name
- Platypeltella angustispora M.L.Farr & Pollack (1969)

Species of fungus

Platypeltella angustispora is a species of fungus in the family Microthyriaceae. It was described as new to science in 1969 by Marie Farr and Flora Pollack, both scientists working at the United States Department of Agriculture. The fungus was found growing on several collections of diseased plant material (Chamaedorea species) sent from Mexico, and intercepted by quarantine inspectors. It was initially thought to be an unknown Pyrenomycetes species of the family Asterinaceae (according to the taxonomical concepts of the time). After studying the material, Farr and Pollack described it as a new species of Platypeltella, clearly distinguishable from the type species (P. smilacis) by the size and shape of its ascospores.
