= Asterostomella =

Scientific classification
- Kingdom: Fungi
- Division: Ascomycota
- Class: Dothideomycetes
- Order: Asterinales
- Family: Asterinaceae
- Genus: Asterostomella; Speg.

Type species
- Asterostomella paraguayensis Speg. Anal.Soc. cient. argent. 22 (4): 198 (1886).

Genus of fungi

Asterostomella is a genus of fungi in the Asterinaceae family. The relationship of this taxon to other taxa within the class is unknown (incertae sedis), and it has not yet been placed with certainty into any order. They are leaf parasites. Such as Asterostomella miliusaeA.K. Singh, Kamal & Shiv K. Singh (1982) is found on Miliusa tomentosa (Roxb.) Finet & Gagnep. plants in India as a type of 'black mildew'.

It is found in South America (including Brazil and Argentina), Africa and parts of Asia. Including the Philippine Islands.

== Description ==
The coelomycetous genus is characterised by brown, ovoid, aseptate pycnidia (fruiting body), sometimes with a non-pigmented band in the middle. The genus is considered as a member of Asterinaceae based on its scutellate (shaped like a shield or platter), or orbicular, conidiomata (blister fruiting body) with stellate dehiscence, which is similar to Asterina.

== Species ==
As accepted by Species Fungorum;

- Asterostomella aberiae Petch (1922)
- Asterostomella acalyphae Syd. (1925)
- Asterostomella africana Syd. & P. Syd. (1910)
- Asterostomella alangii Hosag. & M. Mohanan (1996)
- Asterostomella alchorneae Petr. (1959)
- Asterostomella anogeissi Hosag. & Archana (2012)
- Asterostomella australis (Speg.) E.K. Cash (1972)
- Asterostomella balanseana (P. Karst. & Roum.) Theiss. (1912)
- Asterostomella baliospermi Hosag., Archana & D.K. Agarwal (2007)
- Asterostomella banisteriae Syd. (1929)
- Asterostomella boehmeriae Hosag., M.P. Balakr. & Goos (1996)
- Asterostomella caperoniae Speg. (1910)
- Asterostomella capparis Petr. (1929)
- Asterostomella caricae Henn. (1904)
- Asterostomella celasteri Sabeena, H. Biju, C.K. Biju & S.P. Mathew (2018)
- Asterostomella ceropegiae Hosag., H. Biju & Manojk. (2006)
- Asterostomella combreti Bat. & Cif. (1959)
- Asterostomella concinna Syd. (1930)
- Asterostomella cupaniae Bat. & Cif. (1959)
- Asterostomella daphniphylli Hosag. & K. Ravik. (1994)
- Asterostomella derridicola Hosag., Thimm. & Sabeena (2013)
- Asterostomella dhanikariensis Hosag. (2014)
- Asterostomella dilleniicola M.L. Farr (1986)
- Asterostomella diplocarpa M.L. Farr (1969)
- Asterostomella dispar Speg. (1910)
- Asterostomella dorsteniae Syd. (1927)
- Asterostomella elaeocarpi-serrati Hosag. (2006)
- Asterostomella epiphylla Höhn. & Litsch. (1907)
- Asterostomella erysiphoides (Kalchbr. & Cooke) Bat. & Cif. (1959)
- Asterostomella eugeniicola Doidge (1942)
- Asterostomella excoecariicola Hosag. & Goos (1996)
- Asterostomella farrargunjensis Hosag. (2014)
- Asterostomella flacourtiae-montanae Hosag. & Sabeena (2012)
- Asterostomella flacourtiarum Petr. (1959)
- Asterostomella forsteroniae (Henn.) Maubl. (1918)
- Asterostomella gregariella Petr. & Cif. (1930)
- Asterostomella grewiae Petr. (1959)
- Asterostomella hamatula Cif. (1938)
- Asterostomella helicteris Hosag., M.P. Balakr. & Goos (1996)
- Asterostomella heteropteridis (Henn.) G. Arnaud (1918)
- Asterostomella horrida Bat. & H. Maia (1959)
- Asterostomella indecora Syd. (1927)
- Asterostomella indica V.G. Rao & Anahosur (1972)
- Asterostomella isonandrae Hosag. & Goos (1994)
- Asterostomella isothea Syd. (1927)
- Asterostomella kushinagarensis R.C. Verma, M.S. Tripathi & R.K. Chaudhary (1999)
- Asterostomella kutuensis (Henn.) Bat. & Cif. (1959)
- Asterostomella lauracearum Bat. & J.L. Bezerra (1964)
- Asterostomella ligustri Hosag., M.P. Balakr. & Goos (1996)
- Asterostomella lismorensis Syd. (1937)
- Asterostomella lunaniae Cif. (1962)
- Asterostomella maculosa (Sacc.) S. Hughes (1958)
- Asterostomella meliosmae Bat. & J.L. Bezerra (1961)
- Asterostomella meliosmicola Petr. & Cif. (1932)
- Asterostomella meliosmigena Hosag. (2011)
- Asterostomella micheliae Hosag. & Goos (1996)
- Asterostomella miliusae A.K. Singh, Kamal & Shiv K. Singh (1982)
- Asterostomella minuta G. Arnaud (1918)
- Asterostomella ornata Cif. (1954)
- Asterostomella orthosticha Syd. (1930)
- Asterostomella otonephelii Hosag., D.K. Agarwal, H. Biju & Archana (2006)
- Asterostomella paraguayensis Speg. (1886)
- Asterostomella parameriae Petr. (1931)
- Asterostomella pelladensis Henn. (1908)
- Asterostomella polystigma Syd. (1922)
- Asterostomella pongamiae K.V. Rao, K. Gopal & Manohar. (1989)
- Asterostomella pseudospondiadis Bat. & Cif. (1959)
- Asterostomella radermacherae Hosag., M.P. Balakr. & Goos (1996)
- Asterostomella rhaphiostylidis Hansf. (1944)
- Asterostomella roureae Petr. (1959)
- Asterostomella scolopiae-crenatae Hosag. & T.K. Abraham (1997)
- Asterostomella shoreae Soni, Hosag., Pyasi & R.K. Verma (2010)
- Asterostomella splendida Viégas (1945)
- Asterostomella stipitipodia M.L. Farr (1987)
- Asterostomella strombosiae Hosag., D.K. Agarwal, H. Biju & Archana (2006)
- Asterostomella strophanthi Henn. (1905)
- Asterostomella terminaliae Hosag., M.P. Balakr. & Goos (1996)
- Asterostomella tonduzii Syd. (1927)
- Asterostomella tosaensis I. Hino & Katum. (1963)
- Asterostomella trematis Speg. (1910)
- Asterostomella ubatubensis Viégas (1945)
- Asterostomella vernoniae Hosag., Thimm. & Archana (2013)
- Asterostomella visci Doidge (1942)
- Asterostomella vismiae Bat., J.L. Bezerra & Peres (1964)
- Asterostomella walleniae Petr. & Cif. (1932)
- Asterostomella xylosmae Hosag., Nomani & Kamal (2012)
- Asterostomella ziziphina Hosag. & Archana (2012)

Former species;

- A. cristata (Speg.) Speg. (1910) = Asterina solanicola Asterinaceae
- A. epiphylla var. gallica Bourdot & Galzin (1911) = Asterostomella epiphylla
- A. lepianthis Hosag., M.P. Balakr. & Goos (1996) = Asterina lepianthis
- A. meliosmae I. Hino & Katum. (1961) = Asterostomella tosaensis
- A. meliosmicola Hosag., M.P. Balakr. & Goos (1996) = Asterostomella meliosmigena
- A. veronicae G. Arnaud (1918) = Asterina veronicae
