= Parasterinella =

Scientific classification
- Kingdom: Fungi
- Division: Ascomycota
- Class: Dothideomycetes
- Order: Asterinales
- Family: Asterinaceae
- Genus: Parasterinella; Speg.

Type species
- Parasterinella drimydis (Lév.) Speg.

Genus of fungi

Parasterinella is a genus of fungi in the Asterinaceae family. The relationship of this taxon to other taxa within the class is unknown (incertae sedis), and it has not yet been placed with certainty into any order. This is a monotypic genus, containing the single species Parasterinella drimydis.
