= Asterina =

Asterina may refer to:

- Asterina (echinoderm), a starfish genus in the family Asterinidae
- Asterina (fungus), a fungus genus in the family Asterinaceae
