= Echidnodella vagamonensis =

Scientific classification
- Kingdom: Fungi
- Division: Ascomycota
- Class: Dothideomycetes
- Order: Asterinales
- Family: Asterinaceae
- Genus: Echidnodella
- Species: E. vagamonensis

Binomial name
- Echidnodella vagamonensis J. Thomas & Hina (2021)

Species of fungi

Echidnodella vagamonensis is a parasitic species of fungus in the family Asterinaceae.
