= Asterolibertia =

Scientific classification
- Kingdom: Fungi
- Division: Ascomycota
- Class: Dothideomycetes
- Order: Asterinales
- Family: Asterinaceae
- Genus: Asterolibertia; G. Arnaud

Type species
- Asterolibertia couepiae (Henn.) G. Arnaud

Genus of fungi

Asterolibertia is a genus of fungi in the Asterinaceae family.

The genus name of Asterolibertia is in honour of Marie-Anne Libert (1782-1865), who was a Belgian botanist and mycologist. She was one of the first women plant pathologists.

== Species ==
Known species;
- Asterolibertia anisopterae (Syd. & P.Syd.) Hansf.
- Asterolibertia bahiensis Firmino, Inácio & Dianese
- Asterolibertia bakeri (Syd. & P.Syd.) Hansf.
- Asterolibertia barrinhensis Firmino & Dianese
- Asterolibertia bredemeyerae (Rehm) Arx
- Asterolibertia burchelliae (Doidge) Doidge
- Asterolibertia campograndensis Firmino & Dianese
- Asterolibertia couepiae (Henn.) G.Arnaud
- Asterolibertia crustacea (Ellis & Everh.) Hansf.
- Asterolibertia cryptocaryae (Cooke) Hansf.
- Asterolibertia flabellariae Hansf.
- Asterolibertia gibbosa (Gaillard) Hansf.
- Asterolibertia hiiranensis (W.Yamam.) W.Yamam.
- Asterolibertia hydnocarpi Hosag. & T.K.Abraham
- Asterolibertia inaequalis (Mont.) Toro
- Asterolibertia licaniae (Cooke) Hansf.
- Asterolibertia licaniicola Hansf.
- Asterolibertia malpighii Bat. & H.Maia
- Asterolibertia mangiferae Hansf. & Thirum.
- Asterolibertia megathyria (Doidge) Doidge
- Asterolibertia moquileae (Bat. & H.Maia) J.L.Bezerra, Firmino, S.P.B.Araújo & Jad.Pereira
- Asterolibertia myocoproides (Sacc. & Berl.) Arx
- Asterolibertia nothopegiae Hosag. & T.K.Abraham
- Asterolibertia parinaricola Firmino, Inácio & Dianese
- Asterolibertia parinarii (Syd.) Hansf.
- Asterolibertia peruviana Hansf.
- Asterolibertia pogonophorae Bat. & H.Maia
- Asterolibertia randiae (Doidge) Arx
- Asterolibertia santiriae (Syd. & P.Syd.) Hansf.
- Asterolibertia schroeteri (Rehm) Arx
- Asterolibertia spatholobi Hansf.
- Asterolibertia sporoboli E.Castell. & Graniti
- Asterolibertia thaxteri Hansf.
- Asterolibertia ulei Hansf.
- Asterolibertia vateriae Hosag.
