= Asterina stipitipodia =

Scientific classification
- Kingdom: Fungi
- Division: Ascomycota
- Class: Dothideomycetes
- Order: Asterinales
- Family: Asterinaceae
- Genus: Asterina
- Species: A. stipitipodia

Binomial name
- Asterina stipitipodia M.L. Farr

Species of fungus

Asterina stipitipodia is a species of fungus in the family Asterinaceae, first described by Marie Leonore Farr in 1987. It was originally found on the leaves of Dilleniaceae species in Brazil, South America,
