= Trichasterina =

Scientific classification
- Kingdom: Fungi
- Division: Ascomycota
- Class: Dothideomycetes
- Order: Asterinales
- Family: Asterinaceae
- Genus: Trichasterina; G. Arnaud

Type species
- Trichasterina styracis (Theiss.) G. Arnaud

Genus of fungi

Trichasterina is a genus of fungi in the Asterinaceae family. The relationship of this taxon to other taxa within the class is unknown (incertae sedis), and it has not yet been placed with certainty into any order.

== Species ==
As accepted by Species Fungorum;

- Trichasterina calophylli Hansf. (1958)
- Trichasterina cheirodendri Hansf. (1955)
- Trichasterina desmotis B. Song, T.H. Li & A.L. Zhang (2002)
- Trichasterina goniothalami Hosag. & Goos (1996)
- Trichasterina goniothalamicola B. Song (2002)
- Trichasterina heritierae Sawada & W. Yamam. (1959)
- Trichasterina microspila (Syd.) Hansf. (1954)
- Trichasterina myrtaceicola Bat. & H. Maia (1960)
- Trichasterina polyalthiae Hansf. (1955)
- Trichasterina popowiae (Doidge) Doidge (1942)
- Trichasterina styracis (Theiss.) G. Arnaud (1918)
