= Halbania =

Scientific classification
- Kingdom: Fungi
- Division: Ascomycota
- Class: Dothideomycetes
- Order: Asterinales
- Family: Asterinaceae
- Genus: Halbania; Racib.

Type species
- Halbania cyathearum Racib.

Genus of fungi

Halbania is a genus of fungi in the Asterinaceae family. The relationship of this taxon to other taxa within the class is unknown (incertae sedis), and it has not yet been placed with certainty into any order.

As accepted by Species Fungorum;

- Halbania cryptomeriae Sawada (1950)
- Halbania cyathearum Racib. (1889)
- Halbania juniperi Sawada (1950)
