= Cirsosia =

Scientific classification
- Kingdom: Fungi
- Division: Ascomycota
- Class: Dothideomycetes
- Order: Asterinales
- Family: Asterinaceae
- Genus: Cirsosia; G. Arnaud

Type species
- Cirsosia manaosensis G. Arnaud

Genus of fungi

Cirsosia is a genus of fungi in the Asterinaceae family. The relationship of this taxon to other taxa within the class is unknown (incertae sedis), and it has not yet been placed with certainty into any order.

== Species ==
As accepted by Species Fungorum;

- Cirsosia arecacearum Hosag. & M. Pillai (1994))
- Cirsosia dipterocarpi (Henn.) Bat. & H. Maia (1960)
- Cirsosia flabellariae (Syd.) Bat. & H. Maia (1960)
- Cirsosia globulifera (Pat.) Arx (1962)
- Cirsosia hopeae Hosag., Jac. Thomas & D.K. Agarwal (2011)
- Cirsosia hughesii Bat. & H. Maia (1960)
- Cirsosia humboldtigena L.K. Mathew, N.N. Nair & K. Swapna (2017)
- Cirsosia irregularis (Syd. & P. Syd.) Arx (1962)
- Cirsosia manaosensis (Henn.) G. Arnaud (1918)
- Cirsosia moulmeinensis Thaung (1977)
- Cirsosia santiriae Bat. & H. Maia (1960)
- Cirsosia splendida Bat. & H. Maia (1960)
- Cirsosia transversalis (Syd. & P. Syd.) Deighton (1952)
- Cirsosia vateriae Hosag. (2012)

Former species;

- C. moquileae Bat. & H. Maia (1960) = Asterolibertia moquileae Asterinaceae
- C. splendida var. laevigata Firmino & Dianese (2015) = Cirsosia splendida
