= Meliolaster =

Scientific classification
- Kingdom: Fungi
- Division: Ascomycota
- Class: Dothideomycetes
- Order: Asterinales
- Family: Asterinaceae
- Genus: Meliolaster; Höhn.

Type species
- Meliolaster mackenzii Doidge

Genus of fungi

Meliolaster is a genus of fungi in the Asterinaceae family. The relationship of this taxon to other taxa within the class is unknown (incertae sedis), and it has not yet been placed with certainty into any order.

As accepted by Species Fungorum;

- Meliolaster aporusae Hosag., Harish & Archana (2009)
- Meliolaster clavisporus (Pat.) Höhn. (1918)
