= Dothidasteromella =

Scientific classification
- Kingdom: Fungi
- Division: Ascomycota
- Class: Dothideomycetes
- Order: Asterinales
- Family: Asterinaceae
- Genus: Dothidasteromella; Höhn. (1910)

Type species
- Dothidasteromella sepulta (Berk. & M.A.Curtis) Höhn. (1910)

Genus of fungi

Dothidasteromella is a genus of fungi in the Asterinaceae family. The relationship of this taxon to other taxa within the class is unknown (incertae sedis), and it has not yet been placed with certainty into any order.

== Species ==
- Dothidasteromella acokantherae
- Dothidasteromella brevilobi
- Dothidasteromella evanescens
- Dothidasteromella floridana
- Dothidasteromella hansfordii
- Dothidasteromella magnoliae
- Dothidasteromella pandani
- Dothidasteromella parvispora
- Dothidasteromella pavettae
- Dothidasteromella sepulta
- Dothidasteromella systema-solare
