= Echidnodella africana =

Scientific classification
- Kingdom: Fungi
- Division: Ascomycota
- Class: Dothideomycetes
- Order: Asterinales
- Family: Asterinaceae
- Genus: Echidnodella
- Species: E. africana

Binomial name
- Echidnodella africana (Doidge) Arx (1962)

Species of fungus

Echidnodella africana is a species of parasitic fungi found in South Africa.
