= Parasterinopsis =

Scientific classification
- Domain: Eukaryota
- Kingdom: Fungi
- Division: Ascomycota
- Class: Dothideomycetes
- Order: Asterinales
- Family: Asterinaceae
- Genus: Parasterinopsis; Batista, 1960

Type species
- Parasterinopsis sersalisiae (Hansf.) Bat., 1960

Species
- Parasterinopsis caesalpiniae Bat. & H. Maia, 1963; Parasterinopsis orchidacearum Bat. & Peres, 1963; Parasterinopsis sersalisiae (Hansf.) Bat., 1960

Genus of fungi

Parasterinopsis is a genus of fungi in the Asterinaceae family.
