= Uleothyrium =

Scientific classification
- Kingdom: Fungi
- Division: Ascomycota
- Class: Dothideomycetes
- Order: Asterinales
- Family: Asterinaceae
- Genus: Uleothyrium; Petr.

Type species
- Uleothyrium amazonicum Petr.

Genus of fungi

Uleothyrium is a genus of fungi in the Asterinaceae family. The relationship of this taxon to other taxa within the class is unknown (incertae sedis), and it has not yet been placed with certainty into any order.

The genus was circumscribed by Franz Petrak in Ann. Mycol. vol.14 (1-2) on pages 65, 96 in 1916 and also in Ann. Mycol. vol.27 (5-6) on page 388 in 1929.

The genus name of Uleothyrium is in honour of Ernst Heinrich Georg Ule (1854–1915), who was a German botanist and plant collector.

As accepted by Species Fungorum;

- Uleothyrium amazonicum Petr. (1929)
- Uleothyrium leptocarpum Syd. (1932)

Former species; Uleothyrium clavisporum (Rehm) Syd. (1934) = Prillieuxina clavispora, Asterinaceae
