= Batistinula =

Scientific classification
- Kingdom: Fungi
- Division: Ascomycota
- Class: Dothideomycetes
- Order: Asterinales
- Family: Asterinaceae
- Genus: Batistinula; Arx

Type species
- Batistinula gallesiae Arx

Genus of fungi

Batistinula is a genus of fungi in the Asterinaceae family. The relationship of this taxon to other taxa within the class is unknown (incertae sedis), and it has not yet been placed with certainty into any order. This is a monotypic genus, containing the single species Batistinula gallesiae.
