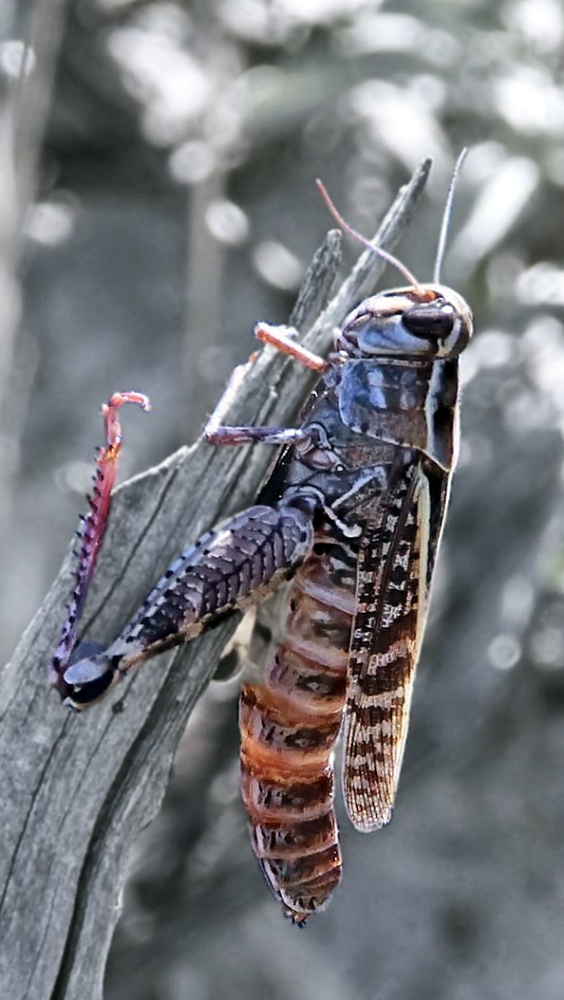

Scientific classification
- Kingdom: Fungi
- Division: Entomophthoromycota
- Class: Entomophthoromycetes
- Order: Entomophthorales
- Family: Entomophthoraceae
- Genus: Entomophaga
- Species: E. grylli

Binomial name
- Entomophaga grylli Fresenius

= Entomophaga grylli =

Species of fungus

Entomophaga grylli is a fungal pathogen which infects and kills grasshoppers. It is the causal agent of one of the most widespread diseases affecting grasshoppers. This is sometimes known as summit disease because infected insects climb to the upper part of a plant and grip the tip of the stem as they die; this ensures widespread dispersal of the fungal spores. The fungus is a species complex with several different pathotypes, each one of which seems to be host-specific to different subfamilies of grasshoppers. The pathogen is being investigated for its possible use in biological pest control of grasshoppers.

== Taxonomy ==
Entomophaga grylli is a species complex which in North America includes the pathotypes E. macleodii and E. calopteni, and in Australia E. praxibuli. The different pathotypes can be distinguished by the formation or lack of formation of primary conidia, the size and the number of nuclei in the conidia, their isozyme profiles, the host species involved, and the geographical range in which they are found. They all attack grasshoppers, but it is not known whether all grasshopper species are susceptible to infection. Each pathotype seems to be host-specific to certain grasshopper subfamilies.

== Life cycle ==
Entomophaga calopteni only produces resting spores, which are available to infect grasshoppers the following year. E. macleodii and E. praxibuli produce both resting spores and asexual conidia. Large numbers of conidia are produced under wet, humid conditions, and several cycles of infection can then occur in a single season. After landing on a potential host, a conidium produces a germ tube which can grow through the cuticle into the hemocoel; once there, it produces amoeboid protoplasts. These are cells without cell walls and seem to elude the insect's immune system. They multiply and kill the host. In some members of the species complex, they develop hyphae with cell walls and grow through the cuticle, producing conidiophores and infective conidia. In these and other members of the species complex, they also have an intermediate stage producing resting spores with cell walls.

After the insect cadaver has fallen to the ground, the resting spores overwinter in the soil. A portion of them germinate in the spring, producing other spores that are forcibly ejected from the soil, landing on low vegetation where they come into contact with grasshoppers. They penetrate through the cuticle, proliferate and develop rapidly, the infected insect dying within about one week. At an advanced stage of the disease, an infected individual climbs to the top of a plant and dies with its limbs gripping the stem and its head pointing upwards. Some resting spores remain dormant in the soil for two or more years. Epizootic outbreaks of disease in grasshopper populations in North America have been attributed to E. grylli but are usually localised and sporadic rather than widespread. They have been credited with ending many outbreaks of grasshopper species over the decades.

== Use in biological control ==
In western Canada and the western United States, grasshoppers are estimated to cause over $400 million economic damage each year to crops and rangeland. From 1986 to 1992 an integrated pest management program was initiated by the United States Department of Agriculture and the Animal and Plant Health Inspection Service to attempt to control grasshopper numbers without the use of vast quantities of insecticide. The inclusion of the E. grylli complex in the program was investigated. A disadvantage to its use is that, unlike entomopathogens such as Metarhizium acridum, the fungus cannot be mass-produced and its effectiveness depends on the weather conditions (more grasshoppers are infected in warm, moist conditions).

Attempts to control grasshoppers with this fungus have been largely ineffective; insects can be successfully infected by injecting them with the pathogen, but introduction of North American pathotypes into Australia and vice versa have failed to establish long term infections. The pathogen has potential for biological control of grasshoppers but more research is needed.
