= Vizellopsis =

Scientific classification
- Kingdom: Fungi
- Division: Ascomycota
- Class: Dothideomycetes
- Order: Asterinales
- Family: Asterinaceae
- Genus: Vizellopsis; Bat., J.L. Bezerra & T. Barros

Type species
- Vizellopsis grevilleae Bat., J.L. Bezerra & T.T. Barros

Genus of fungi

Vizellopsis is a genus of fungi in the class Dothideomycetes and in the Asterinaceae family. A monotypic genus, it contains the single species Vizellopsis grevilleae.

The relationship of this taxon to other taxa within the class is unknown (incertae sedis).

== See also ==
- List of Dothideomycetes genera incertae sedis
