= Platypeltella =

Scientific classification
- Kingdom: Fungi
- Division: Ascomycota
- Class: Dothideomycetes
- Order: Asterinales
- Family: Asterinaceae
- Genus: Platypeltella; Petr. (1929)

Type species
- Platypeltella smilacis Petr. (1929)

Species
- P. angustispora P. irregularis P. smilacis

Synonyms
- Asterinopeltis Bat. & H.Maia (1958)

Genus of fungi

Platypeltella is a genus of fungi in the family Microthyriaceae. The genus was circumscribed by Austrian-Czech mycologist Franz Petrak in 1929, with Platypeltella smilacis as the type and only species. Platypeltella remained monotypic until P. angustispora was added in 1969. A third species, P. irregularis, was described in 1982. All species grow as plant pathogens on monocot hosts.
