= BioControl =

Journal about biological control

- Discipline: Sustainable agriculture
- Language: English
- Edited by: Eric Wajnberg

Publication details
- Former name: Entomophaga
- History: 1956-present
- Publisher: Springer Science+Business Media (The Netherlands)
- Frequency: Bimonthly
- Impact factor: 3.571 (2020)

Standard abbreviations
- ISO 4: BioControl

Indexing
- CODEN: BOCOFW
- ISSN: 1386-6141 (print); 1573-8248 (web)
- OCLC no.: 40434534

Links
- Journal homepage; Online access

BioControl is a peer-reviewed scientific journal published by Springer Science+Business Media covering all aspects of basic and applied research in biological control of invertebrate, vertebrate, and weed pests, and plant diseases. The journal was established in 1956 as Entomophaga and published by Lavoisier, before moving to Springer and obtaining its current name in 1998. BioControl is published bimonthly. From 1998 to 2006, Heikki Hokkannen was the editor-in-chief. The current editor-in-chief is Eric Wajnberg (INRA, France).

== Abstracting and indexing ==
BioControl is currently abstracted and indexed in Academic OneFile, AGRICOLA, Biological Abstracts, BIOSIS Previews, CAB International, Chemical Abstracts Service, Current Contents/Agriculture, Biology & Environmental Sciences, Elsevier BIOBASE - Current Awareness in Biological Sciences, EMBiology Global Health, Science Citation Index, Scopus, Summon by Serial Solutions, and The Zoological Record. According to the Journal Citation Reports, the journal has a 2020 impact factor of 3.571.
