= Echidnodes =

Scientific classification
- Kingdom: Fungi
- Division: Ascomycota
- Class: Dothideomycetes
- Order: Asterinales
- Family: Asterinaceae
- Genus: Echidnodes; Theiss. & Syd.

Type species
- Echidnodes liturae (Cooke) Theiss. & Syd.

Genus of fungi

Echidnodes is a genus of fungi in the Asterinaceae family. The relationship of this taxon to other taxa within the class is unknown (incertae sedis), and it has not yet been placed with certainty into any order.

== Species ==
As accepted by Species Fungorum;

- Echidnodes africana (Doidge) Doidge (1942)
- Echidnodes anisocarpa (Syd. & P. Syd.) Hansf. (1946)
- Echidnodes asterinearum Petr. & Cif. (1930)
- Echidnodes bromeliacearum (Rehm) Theiss. & Syd. (1918)
- Echidnodes bromeliae R.W. Ryan (1924)
- Echidnodes cocoes Syd. (1928)
- Echidnodes curtisiae Doidge (1948)
- Echidnodes denigrata Syd. (1925)
- Echidnodes diospyri Hansf. (1957)
- Echidnodes glonioides (Rehm) Syd. & P. Syd. (1919)
- Echidnodes hypolepidis (Doidge) Doidge (1942)
- Echidnodes hypophylla Syd. & P. Syd. (1918)
- Echidnodes lembosioides (Doidge) Doidge (1942)
- Echidnodes liturae (Cooke) Theiss. & Syd. (1918)
- Echidnodes mammeae R.W. Ryan (1924)
- Echidnodes marcgraviae Bat. & Peres (1967)
- Echidnodes microspora (Chardón) Seaver & Chardón (1926)
- Echidnodes myrtaceicola Bat. & Gayão (1953)
- Echidnodes pandanicola Hosag. & Hanlin (1995)
- Echidnodes patula Petr. (1950)
- Echidnodes pisoniae F. Stevens & R.W. Ryan (1925)
- Echidnodes sandwicensis Petr. (1952)
- Echidnodes serpens (Pat.) Hansf. (1954)
- Echidnodes sydowii Petr. (1948)
- Echidnodes tenompokensis Petr. (1954)
- Echidnodes transvaalensis Doidge (1948)
- Echidnodes visci Petr. (1953)
- Echidnodes vrieseae (Höhn.) Theiss. & Syd. (1918)
- Echidnodes xenospila Syd. (1922)

Former species;

- E. acokantherae (Doidge) Doidge (1942) = Lembosina acokantherae, Lembosinaceae family
- E. aulographoides (Sacc., E. Bommer & M. Rousseau) N.F. Robertson (1950) = Lembosina aulographoides, Lembosinaceae
- E. baccharidincola (Rehm) Theiss. & Syd. (1926) = Prillieuxina baccharidincola, Asterinaceae
- E. bosciae Hansf. (1946) = Lembosina bosciae, Lembosinaceae
- E. canthii Hansf. (1947) = Lembosina canthii, Lembosinaceae
- E. capparis Hansf. (1946) = Lembosia capparis, Asterinaceae
- E. crustacea (Cooke) Hansf. (1954) = Echidnodella crustacea, Asterinaceae
- E. durbana (Van der Byl) Hansf. (1946) = Lembosina durbana, Lembosinaceae
- E. embeliae Hansf. (1947) = Lembosina embeliae, Lembosinaceae
- E. festucae (Lib.) R.W. Ryan (1939) = Morenoina festucae, Asterinaceae
- E. harunganae Hansf. (1945) = Lembosia harunganae, Asterinaceae
- E. heptapleuri (Sacc.) Syd. & P. Syd. (1921) = Lembosina heptapleuri, Lembosinaceae
- E. irregularis (Syd. & P. Syd.) Hansf. (1954) = Cirsosia irregularis, Asterinaceae
- E. natalensis (Doidge) Doidge (1942), = Echidnodella natalensis, Asterinaceae
- E. pandani (Rostr.) Hansf. (1946) = Lembosia pandani, Asterinaceae
- E. psychotriae (G. Arnaud) F. Stevens (1939) = Lembosina psychotriae, Lembosinaceae
- E. quercina (Ellis & G. Martin) Hansf. (1946) = Lembosina quercina, Lembosinaceae
- E. quercina var. burmensis Thaung (2006) = Lembosina quercina, Lembosinaceae
- E. pittospori Hansf. (1947) = Lembosina pittospori, Lembosinaceae
- E. rhoina Doidge (1920) = Lembosina rhoina, Lembosinaceae
- E. sclerolobii (Henn.) Hansf. (1946) = Lembosina sclerolobii, Lembosinaceae
- E. tecleae (Doidge) Bat. & Nascim. (1959) = Asterinella tecleae, Microthyriaceae
- E. tecleae (Doidge) Bat., Nascim. & Peres (1959) = Asterinella tecleae, Microthyriaceae
