= Echidnodella =

Scientific classification
- Kingdom: Fungi
- Division: Ascomycota
- Class: Dothideomycetes
- Order: Asterinales
- Family: Asterinaceae
- Genus: Echidnodella; Theiss. & Syd.

Type species
- Echidnodella linearis (Syd.) Syd.

Genus of fungi

Echidnodella is a genus of fungi in the Asterinaceae family. The relationship of this taxon to other taxa within the class is unknown (incertae sedis), and it has not yet been placed with certainty into any order.

== Species ==
As accepted by Species Fungorum;

- Echidnodella africana (Doidge) Arx (1962)
- Echidnodella angustiformis (Tracy & Earle) F. Stevens (1939)
- Echidnodella camphorae (Earle) Theiss. & Syd. (1918)
- Echidnodella cavendishiae Toro (1934)
- Echidnodella cedralensis Toro (1934)
- Echidnodella crustacea (Cooke) Arx (1962)
- Echidnodella damnacanthi Katum. (1975)
- Echidnodella diaphana Toro (1934)
- Echidnodella furcraeae R.W. Ryan (1924)
- Echidnodella guatemalensis Bat., Nascim. & Peres (1959)
- Echidnodella hopeae Hosag., M.P. Balakr. & Goos (1996)
- Echidnodella imadae Goos & Uecker (1992)
- Echidnodella linearis (Syd. & P. Syd.) Syd. (1918)
- Echidnodella lucumae Arx (1960)
- Echidnodella mabae F. Stevens & R.W. Ryan (1925)
- Echidnodella manilkarae Hosag. & T. Sabu (2005)
- Echidnodella melastomacearum R.W. Ryan (1924)
- Echidnodella memecyli Hosag. & T.K. Abraham (1998)
- Echidnodella miconiae R.W. Ryan (1924)
- Echidnodella mimusopis Hosag., Thimm. & Archana (2013)
- Echidnodella myrciae R.W. Ryan (1924)
- Echidnodella myristicacearum Hosag. & Divya (2013)
- Echidnodella natalensis (Doidge) Arx (1962)
- Echidnodella nephrodii (Racib.) Bat. & I.H. Lima (1960)
- Echidnodella polyalthiae Hosag. (2004)
- Echidnodella psychotriae Katum. (1975)
- Echidnodella raillardiae F. Stevens & R.W. Ryan (1925)
- Echidnodella ramosii (Syd. & P. Syd.) F. Stevens (1939)
- Echidnodella rapaneae I. Hino & Katum. (1957)
- Echidnodella rondeletiae R.W. Ryan (1924)
- Echidnodella rugispora (Tracy & Earle) F. Stevens & R.W. Ryan (1939)
- Echidnodella syzygii Subhedar & V.G. Rao (1977)
- Echidnodella vagamonensis Jac. Thomas bis & H. Mohamed (2021)

Former species;

- E. cocculi F. Stevens & R.W. Ryan (1925) = Lembosina cocculi, Lembosinaceae family
- E. hypolepidis Doidge (1920) = Echidnodes hypolepidis Asterinaceae
- E. vateriae Hosag. & Kamar. (2002) = Marthomamyces vateriae Asterinaceae
