= Euryachora =

Scientific classification
- Kingdom: Fungi
- Division: Ascomycota
- Class: Dothideomycetes
- Order: Capnodiales
- Family: Mycosphaerellaceae
- Genus: Euryachora; Fuckel (1870)

Type species
- Euryachora sedi (Link) Fuckel (1870)

Genus of fungi

Euryachora is a genus of fungi in the family Mycosphaerellaceae.

== Species ==
- Euryachora arjonae
- Euryachora castanopsidis
- Euryachora epilobii
- Euryachora indica
- Euryachora maculiformis
- Euryachora neowashingtoniae
- Euryachora paeoniae
- Euryachora rhytismoides
- Euryachora sacchari
- Euryachora sedi
- Euryachora syzygii
