= Biological exponential growth =

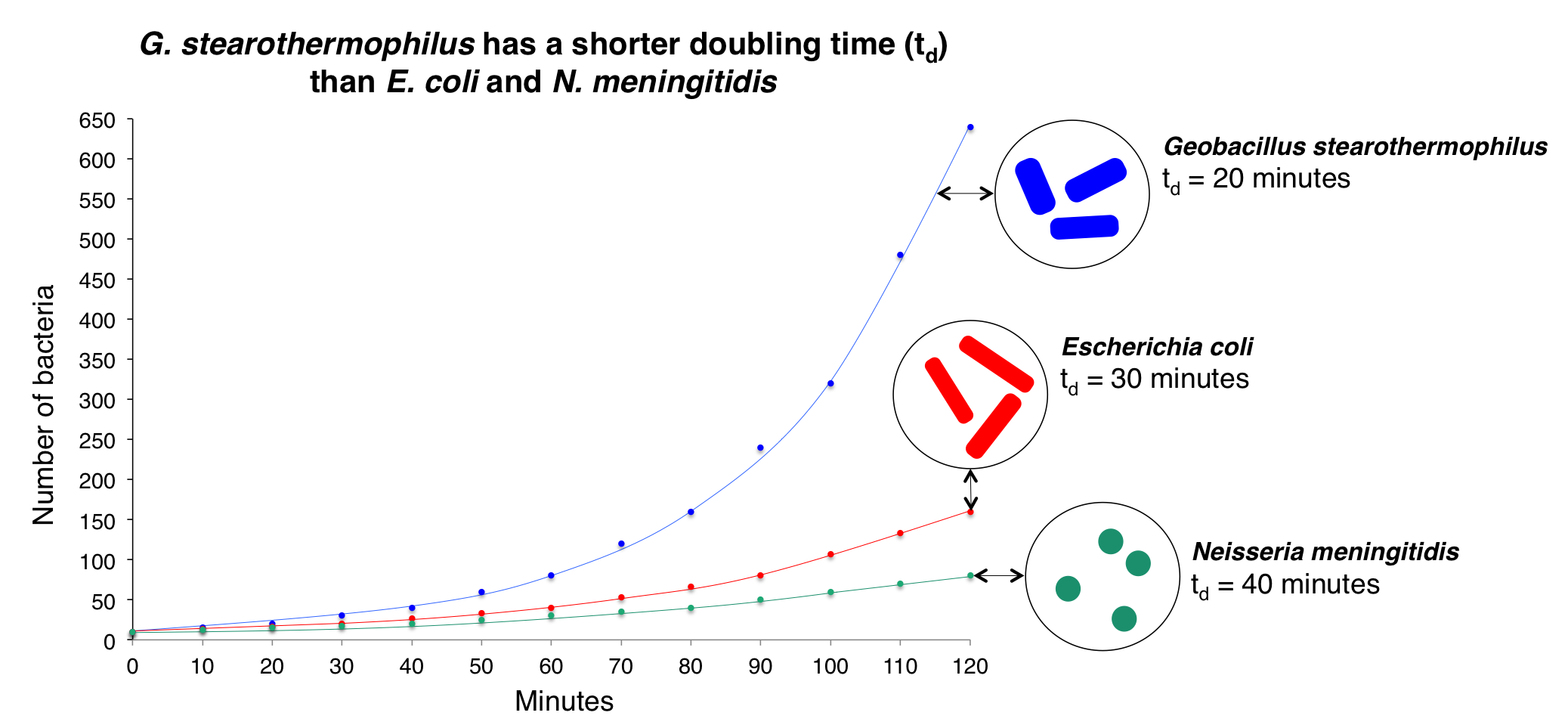
Graph showing the exponential growth of three species of bacteria

Biological exponential growth is the unrestricted growth of a population of organisms, occurring when resources in its habitat are unlimited. Most commonly apparent in species that reproduce quickly and asexually, like bacteria, exponential growth is intuitive from the fact that each organism can divide and produce two copies of itself. Each descendent bacterium can itself divide, again doubling the population size (as displayed in the above graph). The bacterium Escherichia coli, under optimal conditions, may divide as often as twice per hour. Left unrestricted, the growth could continue, and a colony would cover the Earth's surface in less than a day. Resources are the determining factor in establishing biological exponential growth, and there are different mathematical equations used to analyze and quantify it.

== Resources ==
Resource availability is essential for the unimpeded growth of a population. Examples of resources organisms use are food, water, shelter, sunlight, and nutrients.[1][2] Ideally, when resources in the habitat are unlimited, each species can fully realize its innate potential to grow in number, as Charles Darwin observed while developing his theory of natural selection. Any species growing exponentially under unlimited resource conditions can reach enormous population densities in a short time. Darwin showed how even a slow-growing animal like the elephant could theoretically reach an enormous population if there were unlimited resources for its growth in its habitat.[3] This is unrealistic in almost all situations (with exceptions, such as a laboratory). There is simply a finite quantity of everything necessary for life, and individuals in a population will compete with their own or other species for these finite resources.[4]

=== Mathematical Equations ===
One equation used to analyze biological exponential growth uses the birth and death rates in a population. If, in a hypothetical population of size N, the birth rates (per capita) are represented as b and death rates (per capita) as d, then the increase or decrease in N during a time period t will be

$\frac{dN}{dt}=(b-d)N$

(b-d) is called the 'intrinsic rate of natural increase' and is a parameter chosen for assessing the impacts of any biotic or abiotic factor on population growth.

As the population approaches its carrying capacity, the rate of growth decreases, and the population trend will become logistic. Once the carrying capacity, or K, is incorporated to account for the finite resources that a population will be competing for within an environment, the aforementioned equation becomes the following:

$\frac{dN}{dt}=r_{max}\frac{dN}{dt}=r_{max}N\frac{K-N}{K}$

The variable $r_\max$ is the population's maximum growth rate, which is also known as biotic potential. A graph of this equation creates an S-shaped curve, which demonstrates how initial population growth is exponential due to the abundance of resources and lack of competition. When factors that limit an organisms growth are not available in constant supply to meet the growing demand, such as RNA and protein amounts in bacteria, the growth of the organism cannot continue at this exponential rate. As resources become more limited, the growth rate tapers off, and eventually, once growth rates are at the carrying capacity of the environment, the population size will taper off. This S-shaped curve observed in logistic growth is a more accurate model than exponential growth for observing real-life population growth of organisms.

=== Other Fields ===
Biological exponential growth has ties to other scientific fields such as chemical ecology and microbiology. In relation to chemical ecology, the reactions that occur between the chemicals termed secondary metabolites of organisms impacts how they reproduce, feed, and defend themselves. Therefore, secondary metabolites are a type of resource that influences the growth of organisms as well.

== See also ==
- Malthusian catastrophe
- r/K selection theory

== Sources ==
John A. Miller and Stephen B. Harley zoology 4th edition
