= Azygospore =

Azygospore is an asexually formed zygospore in fungi.

Also known as parthenogenically formed from a gamete without gametic fusion.

Sometimes, gametangia fail to fuse. Gametangia become surrounded by a thick wall resulting in the formation of azygospore
