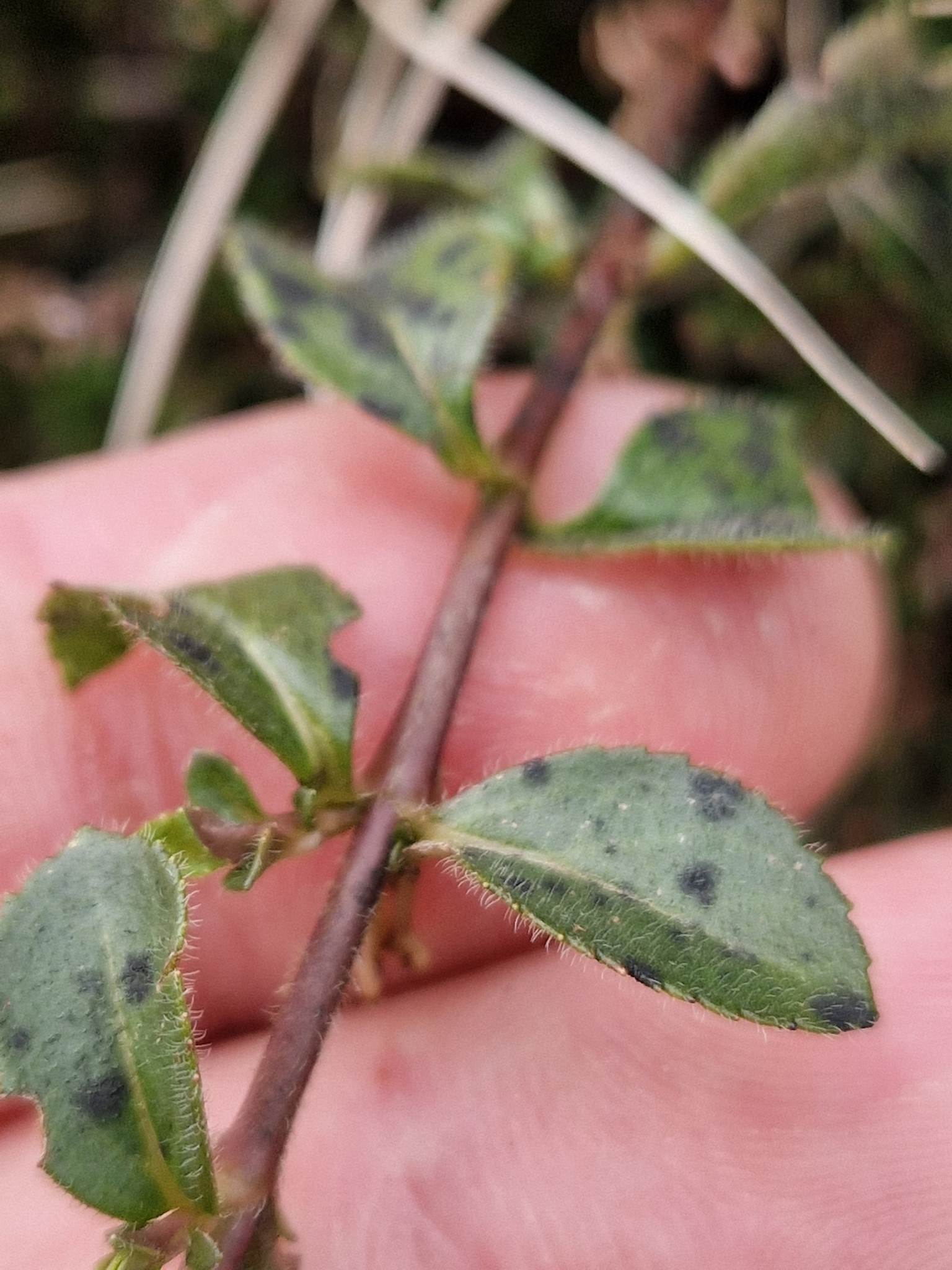
- Asterina veronicae

Scientific classification
- Kingdom: Fungi
- Division: Ascomycota
- Class: Dothideomycetes
- Order: Asterinales
- Family: Asterinaceae
- Genus: Asterina; Lév. (1845)

Type species
- Asterina melastomatis (1845)

Synonyms
- Myxasterina F.von Höhnel, 1909; Opeasterina Spegazzini, 1919

= Asterina (fungus) =

Genus of fungi

Asterina is a large genus of fungi in the family Asterinaceae family. It was then placed in order Asterinales later. The genus was circumscribed by French mycologist Joseph-Henri Léveillé in 1845.

The genus was originally introduced as a member of the Sphaeriaceae family (a former family with parasitic fungi having globose and sometimes necked or beaked perithecia) with four species; Asterina azarae, Asterina compacta, Asterina pulla and the type Asterina melastomatis.

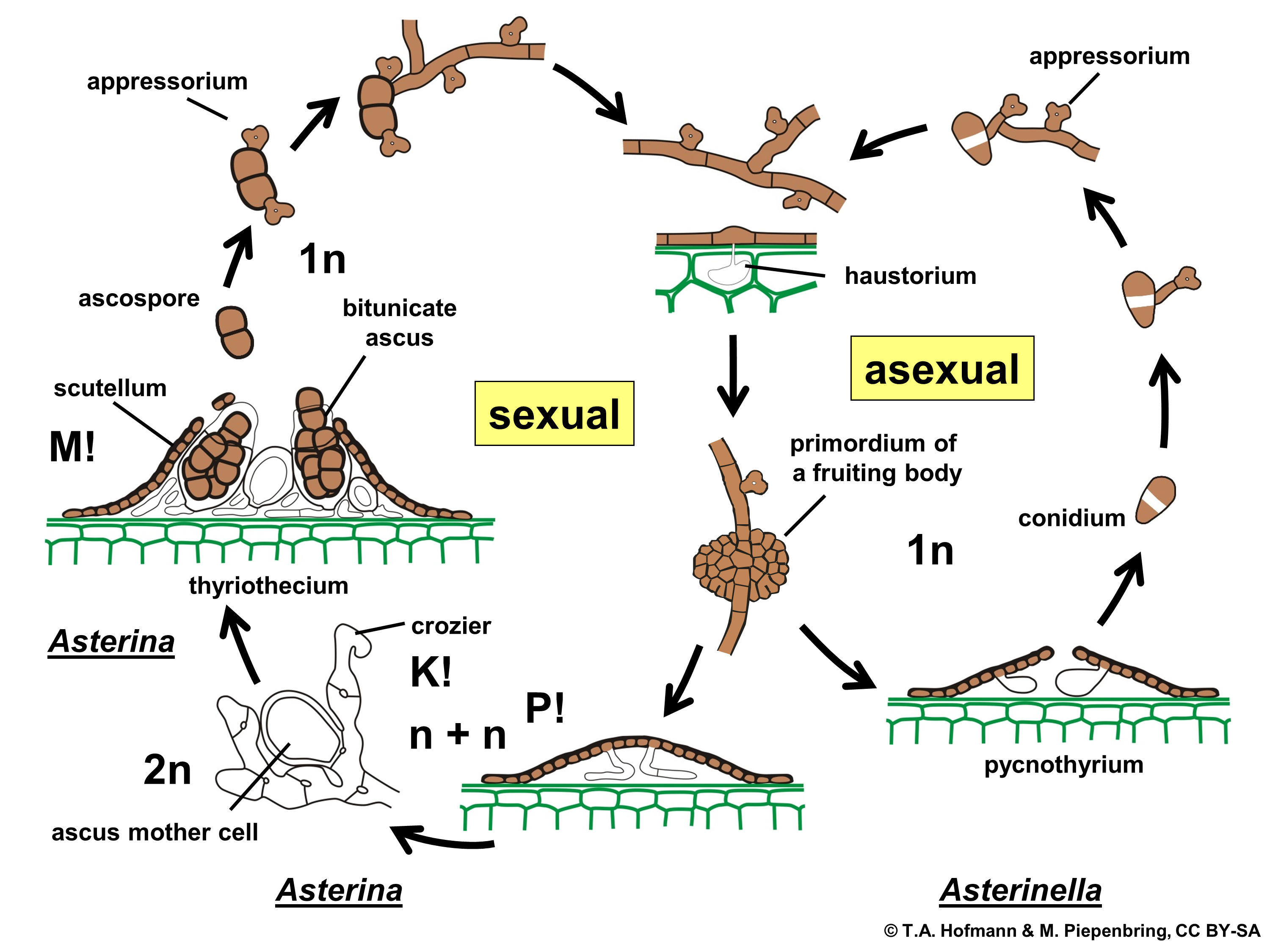
It is currently the largest genus in Asterinaceae family, but only nine species have DNA sequence data available in GenBank due to its unculturable character. Species in the genus generally have circular thyriothecia (an inverted ascocarp) with stellate dehiscence (division), lateral appressoria (infecting cell), globose asci (sexual spore), and dark brown, 1-septate (wall) ascospores.

The generally have cosmopolitan distribution, worldwide. Including China, New Zealand, Kenya, India, and Panama (South America).

== Hosts ==
They are generally are found as pathogens on plants, such as Asterina gaiadendricola is found on Gaiadendron punctatum (Loranthaceae family) and Asterina schlegeliae on Schlegelia parviflora (Schlegeliaceae), Asterina consobrina on Solanum aphyodendron Solanaceae), Asterina fuchsiae on Fuchsia paniculata (Onagraceae) and Asterina phenacis on Phenax mexicanus (Urticaceae). While both Asterina manihotis and Asterina ciferriana were both found on Caesalpinia bonduc, (Fabaceae).

Six species (Asterina indodeightonii, Asterina mioconsobrina, Asterina miosphaerelloides, Asterina neocombreticola, Asterina neoelaeocarpi and Asterina presaracae), where found on fossil angiosperm leaf remains recovered from the Siwalik sediments (mid-Miocene to early Pleistocene) of Arunachal Pradesh in the eastern Himalayas. Found on plant genera resembling the genera of Actinodaphne (Lauraceae), Anthocephalus (Rubiaceae), Combretum (Combretaceae), Lindera (Lauraceae) and Unona (Annonaceae).

== Species ==
As of 27 August 2023, the GBIF lists up to 740 species, while Species Fungorum lists about 727 species (out of 931 records). About 1,085 species were accepted by Wijayawardene et al. in 2020.

=== Selected species ===
- Asterina adeniicola
- Asterina advenula
- Asterina canthiigena
- Asterina ceropegiae
- Asterina champereiicola
- Asterina congesta
- Asterina congregata
- Asterina connectilis
- Asterina consobrina
- Asterina corallopoda
- Asterina coriacella
- Asterina daphniphyllicola
- Asterina delitescens
- Asterina enicostemmatis
- Asterina erebia
- Asterina euryae
- Asterina flacourtiae
- Asterina fragillissima
- Asterina funtumiae
- Asterina gaiadendricola
- Asterina gamsii
- Asterina geniostomatis
- Asterina girardiniae
- Asterina glycosmidigena
- Asterina glycosmidis
- Asterina glyptopetali
- Asterina guaranitica
- Asterina gymnemae
- Asterina hainanensis
- Asterina hederae
- Asterina himantia
- Asterina hydrocotyles
- Asterina hyptidicola
- Asterina indecora
- Asterina jahnii
- Asterina jasmini
- Asterina lauracearum
- Asterina lawsoniae
- Asterina laxiuscula
- Asterina ligustricola
- Asterina lobulifera
- Asterina loranthigena
- Asterina madikeriensis
- Asterina mahoniae
- Asterina malloti-apeltae
- Asterina manihotis
- Asterina melastomatis
- Asterina miliusae
- Asterina mimusopsidicola
- Asterina myrsinacearum
- Asterina nodulosa
- Asterina nyanzae
- Asterina orbicularis
- Asterina oreocnidegena
- Asterina orthosticha
- Asterina parsonsiae
- Asterina phoebeicola
- Asterina phoebes
- Asterina phoradendricola
- Asterina phyllanthigena
- Asterina plectranthi
- Asterina polygalae
- Asterina pouzolziae
- Asterina prataprajii
- Asterina psychotriicola
- Asterina pulchella
- Asterina quarta
- Asterina ramonensis
- Asterina randiae-benthamianae
- Asterina rhodomyrti
- Asterina sarcandrae
- Asterina sawadai
- Asterina schimae
- Asterina schlegeliae
- Asterina scleropyri
- Asterina scruposa
- Asterina solanicola
- Asterina sponiae
- Asterina stipitipodia
- Asterina sublibera
- Asterina suttonii
- Asterina systema-solare
- Asterina talacauveriana
- Asterina tenella
- Asterina tetracericola
- Asterina tetrazygiicola
- Asterina toddaliicola
- Asterina torulosa
- Asterina toxocarpi
- Asterina tylophorae-indicae
- Asterina veronicae
- Asterina viburni
