= Asterinaceae =

Scientific classification
- Kingdom: Fungi
- Division: Ascomycota
- Class: Dothideomycetes
- Order: Asterinales; M.E.Barr ex D.Hawksw. & O.E.Erikss. (1986)
- Family: Asterinaceae; Hansf. (1946)

Type genus
- Asterina Lév. (1845)

Family of fungi

The Asterinaceae are a family of fungi in the class Asterinales.

== Genera ==
This is a list of the genera in the Asterinaceae, based on a 2021 review and summary of fungal classification by Wijayawardene and colleagues. Following the genus name is the taxonomic authority (those who first circumscribed the genus; standardized author abbreviations are used), year of publication, and the number of species:

- Asterina Lév. – ca. 1085 spp.
- Asterolibertia G.Arnaud – ca. 30 spp.
- Asterostomella Speg. – 87 spp.
- Batistinula Arx – 1 sp.
- Cirsosia G.Arnaud – 18 spp.
- Dothidasteromella Höhn. – 11 spp.
- Echidnodella Theiss. & Syd. – 35 spp.
- Echidnodes Theiss. & Syd., 1918 – 27 spp.
- Halbania Racib. – 3 spp.
- Meliolaster Höhn. – 3 spp.
- Morenoina Theiss. - 26 spp.
- Parasterinopsis Bat. – 3 spp.
- Platypeltella Petr. – 3 spp.
- Prillieuxina G.Arnaud – 66 spp.
- Schenckiella Henn. – 1 sp.
- Steyaertia Bat. & H.Maia, 1960 - 1sp.
- Trichasterina G.Arnaud – 11 spp.
- Uleothyrium Petr. – 3 spp.
- Vizellopsis Bat., J.L.Bezerra & T.T.Barros – 1 sp.
