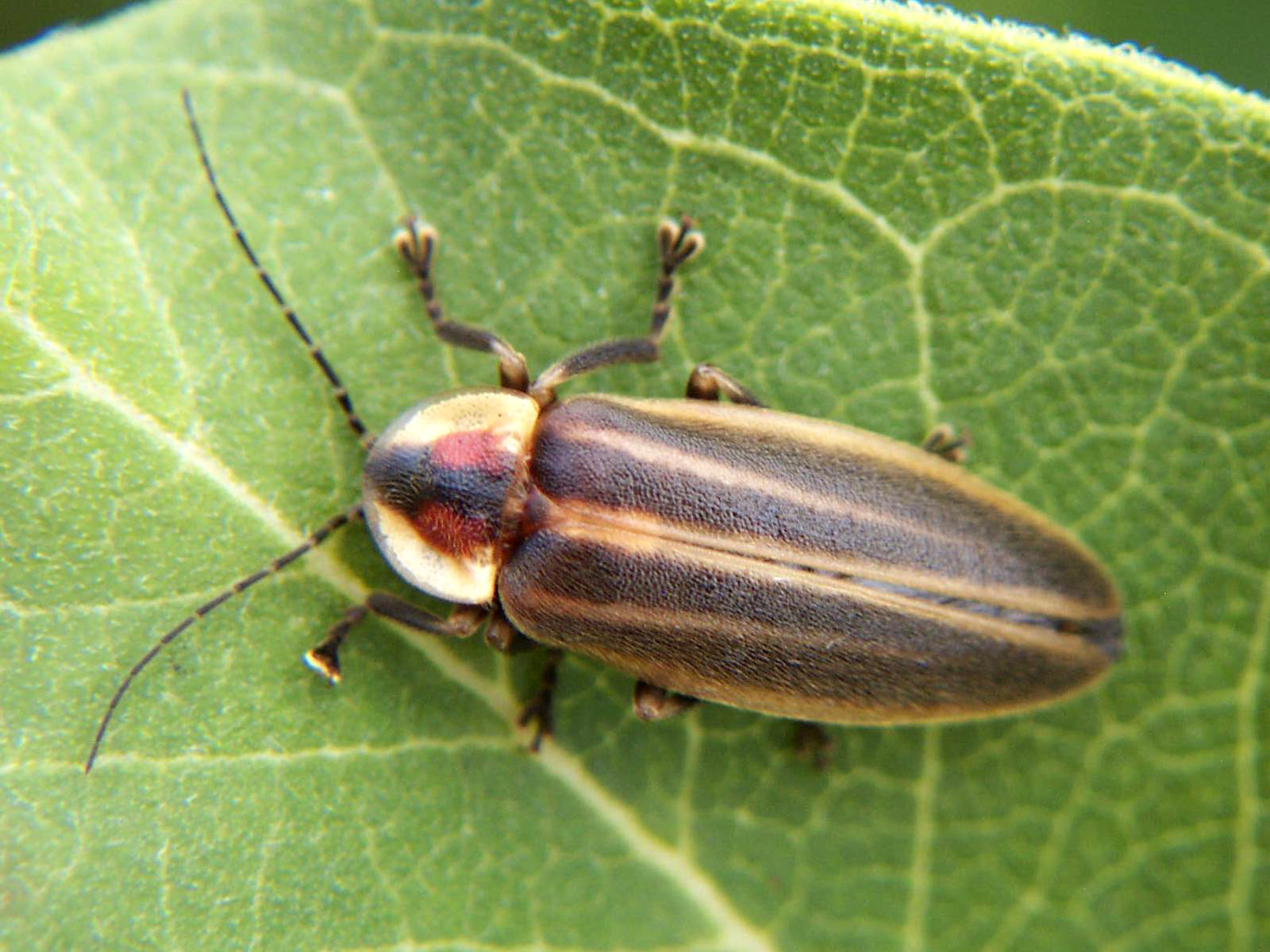
- Photuris lucicrescens

Scientific classification
- Kingdom: Animalia
- Phylum: Arthropoda
- Clade: Pancrustacea
- Class: Insecta
- Order: Coleoptera
- Suborder: Polyphaga
- Infraorder: Elateriformia
- Superfamily: Elateroidea; Leach, 1815

Families
- 10, see text

= Cantharoid beetles =

Group of beetles

The Cantharoid beetles are a group of beetles formerly placed in the now deprecated superfamily Cantharoidea. The family was found to be non-monophyletic taxonomic and most former members are now placed within the accepted superfamily Elateroidea. Some former families, Drilidae and Omalisidae, are now placed within Elateridae. One former family, Cneoglossidae, is now in the superfamily Byrrhoidea.

== Families ==
The superfamily contained ten families. These are now families in Elateroidea, except where indicated.

- Brachypsectridae Leconte & Horn, 1883 (Texas beetles).
- Cneoglossidae Champion, 1897. Now treated as a family in the superfamily Byrrhoidea.
- Homalisidae. This monotypic family contained the genus Homalisus, which is now treated as genus Omalisus in subfamily Omalisinae of Elateridae.
- Lycidae Laporte, 1836 (net-winged beetles)
- Drilidae Blanchard, 1845 (false firefly beetles). Now treated as tribe Drilini in subfamily Agryoninae of Elateridae.
- Phengodidae LeConte 1861 (glowworm beetles)
- Telegeusidae Leng, 1920 (long-lipped beetles). Sometimes treated as subfamily of Omethidae.
- Lampyridae Rafinesque, 1815 (firefly beetles)
- Omethidae LeConte, 1861 – (false soldier beetles)
- Cantharidae Imhoff, 1856 (1815) (soldier beetles)
