= Batkoa =

Scientific classification
- Kingdom: Fungi
- Division: Entomophthoromycota
- Class: Entomophthoromycetes
- Order: Entomophthorales
- Family: Entomophthoraceae
- Genus: Batkoa; R. A. Humber, 1989

Genus of fungi

Batkoa is a genus of fungi within the family of Entomophthoraceae and order Entomophthorales of the Zygomycota. This has been supported by molecular phylogenetic analysis (Gryganskyi et al. 2012).

The genus name of Batkoa is named by the American mycologist Richard A. Humber in 1989 to honor the Polish mycologist Andrzej Batko (1933–1997).

The presence of rhizoids and having globose (rounded) rather than pear-shaped conidia helps identify Batkoa species from Entomophaga species.

== Description ==
The Hyphal bodies are elongated and walled (but not proto-plastic). The condiphores are simple with narrow 'neck' between the conidium and condiogenous cell. The primary condia are globose and round, multi-nucleate, discharged by papillar eversion. The rhizoids (if present) are thicker than the vegetative hypae, with terminal discoid holdfast. The resting spores bud laterally from the parental cell. Unfixed nuclei have granular contents stained by aceto-orcein.

== Infection ==
Generally, when an insect (or host) comes in contact with Batkoa spores, they enter its body through leg joints or other chinks in its armor or through gaps in the 'skin'. The spores then start to multiply. As the fungi begin to overwhelm the insect, it stops eating, mating and crawls (or flies short distances) to a high, exposed place like on the side of a tree trunk or at the tip of a tall grass blade. There the fungus sends out threadlike hyphae from within the bug and attaching the insect to its perch, securely. The Batkoa fungus somehow triggers the host insect to open its wings fully, exposing its soft abdomen completely. That is the last time the host moves. Finally, the very small spores are expelled out from the insect's belly, showering everything below with spores and potentially, 'powdered death'.

== Hosts ==
Batkoa major is known to infect the invasive spotted lanternfly (Lycorma delicatula) in north-eastern North America, including Pennsylvania. No other recorded insects have been killed by Batkoa major in the Pennsylvania area. Batkoa major is also a host on the ptilodactylid beetle (Ptilodactyla serricollis in Maine and North Carolina. The pine beauty moth (Panolis flammea) in Scotland. It was also found on aphid, Myzodium modestrum in Sweden (Gustafsson, 1965).

In June 2007, an epizootic was observed in a crane fly (Tipula sp.) population in an area between Galugah to Bishehband in Mazandaran province of Iran. The fungus was identified as Batkoa apiculata (Thaxter) Humber. Batkoa apiculata has also been reported discovered on 3 species of aphid in France (Thoizon, 1970) and while in Poland, it was found on a wide range of insects (Balazy, 1993). Baktoa apiculata has also been found on moth, Mentaxya muscosa (Lepidoptera, Noctuidae) in Africa.

Various Batkoa species and also Furia species are being studied for the control of the (spittlebugs) cercopids Mahanarva fimbriolata and Deois schach which are known pests of sugarcane and pastures in Brazil.

Batkoa amrascae S. Keller & Villac. (1997) infects the cotton leafhopper, Amrasca biguttula (Homoptera: Cicadellidae) in the Philippines.

In Spain, Batkoa apiculata was found on Diptera Nematocera and Batkoa limoniae was found on Diptera Limoniidae.

== Distribution ==
It has been recorded being found mainly in North America and Great Britain, with a few other recordings elsewhere. Such as parts of Europe; France, Poland, Sweden, Spain, Iran, the Philippines, and Brazil. Batkoa hydrophila, and Batkoa gigantea has been recorded found in Switzerland.

== Species ==
As accepted by Species Fungorum;

- Batkoa amrascae S. Keller & Villac. (1997)
- Batkoa apiculata (Thaxt.) Humber (1989)
- Batkoa cercopidis (S. Keller) B. Huang, Humber & K.T. Hodge (2007)
- Batkoa dysderci (Viégas) Humber (1989)
- Batkoa gigantea (S. Keller) Humber (1989)
- Batkoa hydrophila S. Keller (2007)
- Batkoa limoniae (S. Keller) Niell & Santam. (2001)
- Batkoa major (Thaxt.) Humber (1989)
- Batkoa papillata (Thaxt.) Humber (1989)
- Batkoa pseudapiculata (S. Keller) B. Huang, Humber & K.T. Hodge (2007)
