= Ptilodactyla escalonai =

Scientific classification
- Domain: Eukaryota
- Kingdom: Animalia
- Phylum: Arthropoda
- Class: Insecta
- Order: Coleoptera
- Suborder: Polyphaga
- Infraorder: Elateriformia
- Family: Ptilodactylidae
- Genus: Ptilodactyla
- Species: P. escalonai

Binomial name
- Ptilodactyla escalonai Lawrence et al., 2024

Species of beetle

Ptilodactyla escalonai is a species of toe-winged beetle in the family Ptilodactylidae. It is found in Australia.

== Description ==
Ptilodactyla escalonai the first Ptilodactyla species described from Australia. It is morphologically similar to the species P. acuta.

== Distribution ==
It has mostly been found on the Cape York Peninsula in the state of Queensland.

== Etymology ==
The specific epithet "escalonai" is a tribute to Dr. Hermes E. Escalona, a friend and colleague of the authors.
