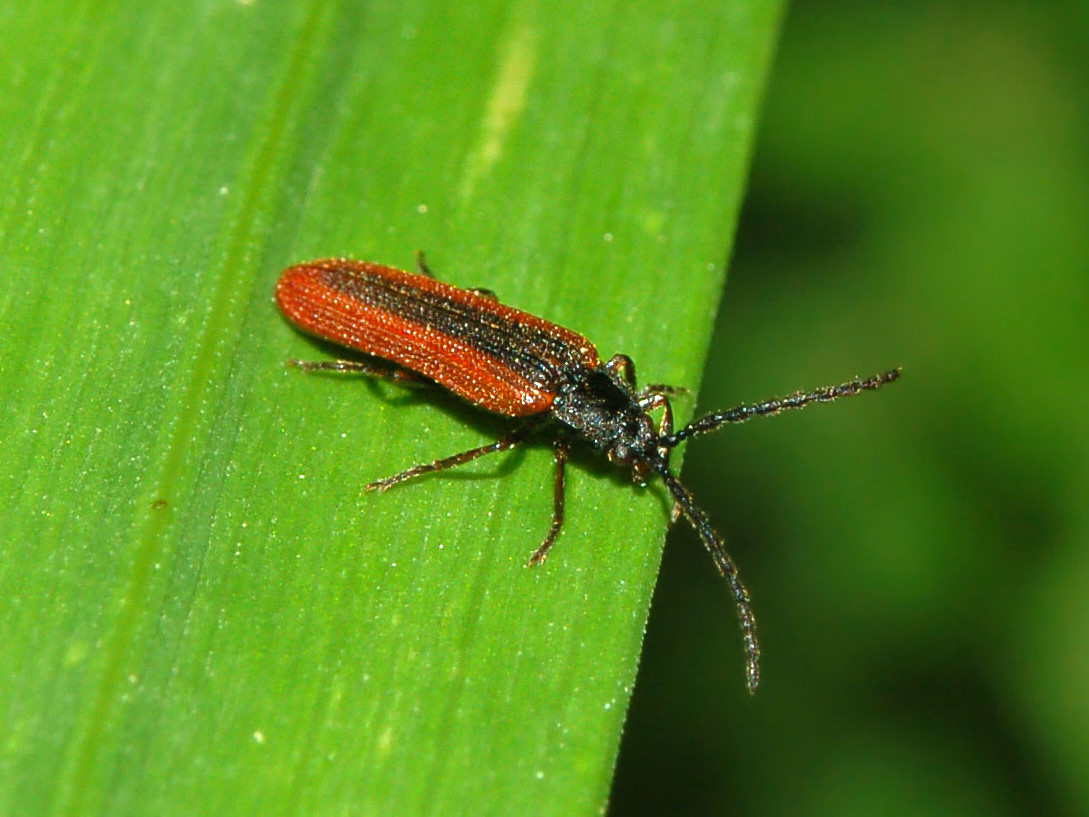
- Omalisus fontisbellaquaei

Scientific classification
- Kingdom: Animalia
- Phylum: Arthropoda
- Class: Insecta
- Order: Coleoptera
- Suborder: Polyphaga
- Infraorder: Elateriformia
- Family: Elateridae
- Subfamily: Omalisinae; Lacordaire, 1857

= Omalisinae =

Subfamily of beetles

The Omalisinae (formerly family Omalisidae) are a small subfamily of morphologically derived elaterid beetles. The Omalisinae were long considered an independent family in the deprecated superfamily Cantharoidea (more closely related to soft-bodied beetles like fireflies, than click beetles), and later a family in the Elateroidea, but molecular phylogenies have demonstrated that the morphological similarity of Omalisinae to other soft bodied beetles is a case of parallel evolution (homoplasy) of their soft bodies, rather than an apomorphy. Members of this beetle subfamily have been reported to have bioluminescent organs on the larvae, although no recent publications have confirmed this. Some recent evidence indicated they were the sister group to a clade comprising the families Rhagophthalmidae and Phengodidae (glowworm beetles), however a more comprehensive phylogenetic analysis based on genome sequences strongly supported the Omalisinae as being contained within the Elateridae.

== Species ==
- Genus Omalisus Geoffroy, 1762
  - Omalisus flavangulus (Spåth, 1898)
  - Omalisus fontisbellaquaei Geoffroy in Fourcroy, 1785
  - Omalisus graecus (Pic, 1901)
  - Omalisus minutus (Pic, 1938)
  - Omalisus nicaeensis (Lesne, 1921)
  - Omalisus nigricornis (Reitter, 1881)
  - Omalisus sanguinipennis (Laporte de Castelnau, 1840)
  - Omalisus taurinensis (Baudi, 1871)
  - Omalisus unicolor (Costa, 1857)
  - Omalisus victoris (Mulsant, 1852)
- Genus Thilmanus Baudi, 1872
  - Thilmanus longipennis Pic, 1912
  - Thilmanus obscurus Baudi, 1872
