= Lachnodactyla texana =

Scientific classification
- Domain: Eukaryota
- Kingdom: Animalia
- Phylum: Arthropoda
- Class: Insecta
- Order: Coleoptera
- Suborder: Polyphaga
- Infraorder: Elateriformia
- Family: Ptilodactylidae
- Genus: Lachnodactyla
- Species: L. texana

Binomial name
- Lachnodactyla texana Schaeffer, 1906

Species of beetle

Lachnodactyla texana is a species of toe-winged beetle in the family Ptilodactylidae. It is found in Central America and North America.
