= Ptilodactyla hyperglotta =

Scientific classification
- Domain: Eukaryota
- Kingdom: Animalia
- Phylum: Arthropoda
- Class: Insecta
- Order: Coleoptera
- Suborder: Polyphaga
- Infraorder: Elateriformia
- Family: Ptilodactylidae
- Genus: Ptilodactyla
- Species: P. hyperglotta

Binomial name
- Ptilodactyla hyperglotta Johnson & Freytag, 1982

Species of beetle

Ptilodactyla hyperglotta is a species of toe-winged beetle in the family Ptilodactylidae. It is found in North America.
