= Ptilodactyla carinata =

Scientific classification
- Domain: Eukaryota
- Kingdom: Animalia
- Phylum: Arthropoda
- Class: Insecta
- Order: Coleoptera
- Suborder: Polyphaga
- Infraorder: Elateriformia
- Family: Ptilodactylidae
- Genus: Ptilodactyla
- Species: P. carinata

Binomial name
- Ptilodactyla carinata Johnson & Freytag, 1978

Species of beetle

Ptilodactyla carinata is a species of toe-winged beetle in the family Ptilodactylidae. It is found in North America.
