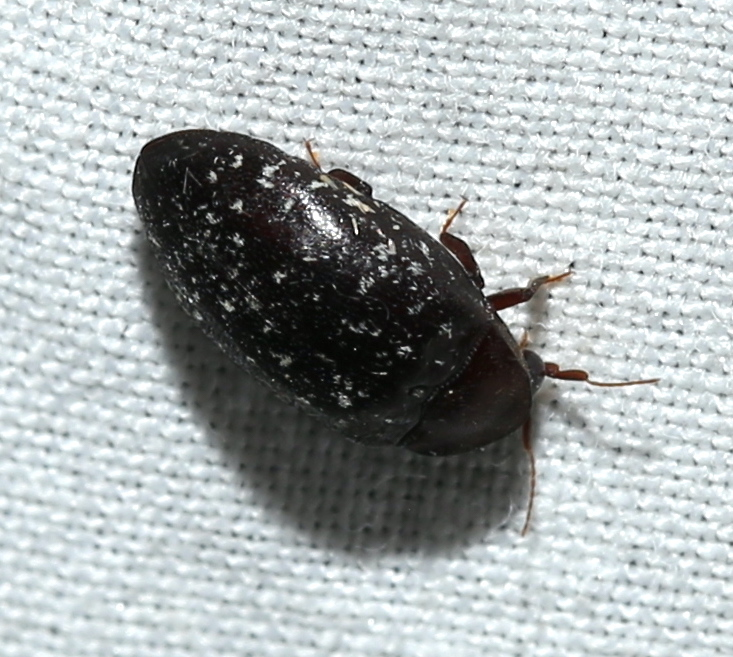

Scientific classification
- Kingdom: Animalia
- Phylum: Arthropoda
- Class: Insecta
- Order: Coleoptera
- Suborder: Polyphaga
- Infraorder: Elateriformia
- Family: Chelonariidae
- Genus: Chelonarium
- Species: C. lecontei

Binomial name
- Chelonarium lecontei Thomson, 1867

= Chelonarium lecontei =

Species of beetle

Chelonarium lecontei is a species of turtle beetle in the family Chelonariidae. It is found in North America.
