= Podabrocephalus =

Scientific classification
- Domain: Eukaryota
- Kingdom: Animalia
- Phylum: Arthropoda
- Class: Insecta
- Order: Coleoptera
- Suborder: Polyphaga
- Infraorder: Elateriformia
- Superfamily: Byrrhoidea
- Family: Ptilodactylidae
- Subfamily: Ptilodactylinae
- Genus: Podabrocephalus; Pic, 1913
- Species: P. sinuaticollis

Binomial name
- Podabrocephalus sinuaticollis Pic, 1913

Genus of beetles

Podabrocephalus is an enigmatic monotypic genus in the family Ptilodactylidae. For decades it had historically been placed in its own family, Podabrocephalidae, or sometimes included in the highly diverse family Cerambycidae, but more recent analyses firmly place it within Ptilodactylidae. Its only species is Podabrocephalus sinuaticollis, known from southern India.
