= Araeopidius =

Scientific classification
- Kingdom: Animalia
- Phylum: Arthropoda
- Class: Insecta
- Order: Coleoptera
- Suborder: Polyphaga
- Infraorder: Elateriformia
- Family: Ptilodactylidae
- Genus: Araeopidius; Cockerell, 1906

Genus of beetles

Araeopidius is a genus of toe-winged beetles in the family Ptilodactylidae. There is one described species in Araeopidius, A. monachus.
