= Pherocladus =

Scientific classification
- Kingdom: Animalia
- Phylum: Arthropoda
- Clade: Pancrustacea
- Class: Insecta
- Order: Coleoptera
- Suborder: Polyphaga
- Infraorder: Elateriformia
- Family: Ptilodactylidae
- Subfamily: Ptilodactylinae
- Genus: Pherocladus; Fairmaire, 1881

Genus of beetles

Pherocladus is a genus of toe-winged beetles in the family Ptilodactylidae.

== Species ==
The following species are recognized:

- Pherocladus atriceps Pic, 1923 – Sumatra
- Pherocladus capucina Pic, 1923 – Sumatra
- Pherocladus castanescens Pic, 1923 – Borneo
- Pherocladus dermestoides (Fairmaire, 1881) – Fiji
- Pherocladus inlateralis Pic, 1923 – Sumatra
- Pherocladus monteithi Lawrence et al., 2024 – Australia
- Pherocladus palawanus Delève, 1972 – Philippines
- Pherocladus plicata Pic, 1923 – Borneo
- Pherocladus singularicollis Pic, 1935 – Borneo
- Pherocladus testaceomaculata Pic, 1923 – Sumatra
