= Chelonarium =

Scientific classification
- Domain: Eukaryota
- Kingdom: Animalia
- Phylum: Arthropoda
- Class: Insecta
- Order: Coleoptera
- Suborder: Polyphaga
- Infraorder: Elateriformia
- Family: Chelonariidae
- Genus: Chelonarium; Fabricius, 1801

Genus of beetles

Chelonarium is a genus of turtle beetles in the family Chelonariidae. There are about 14 described species in Chelonarium.

== Species ==
These 14 species belong to the genus Chelonarium:

- Chelonarium atrum Fabricius, 1801
- Chelonarium grande Pic, 1922
- Chelonarium lecontei Thomson, 1867
- Chelonarium liratulum Ancey, 1884
- Chelonarium luteovestitum Méquignon, 1934
- Chelonarium montanum Wickham, 1914
- Chelonarium murinum Méquignon, 1934
- Chelonarium nitidum Méquignon, 1934
- Chelonarium obscuripenne Pic, 1917
- Chelonarium pilosellum Chevrolat, 1880
- Chelonarium rufum Pic, 1922
- Chelonarium simulator Méquignon, 1934
- Chelonarium sp-one
- Chelonarium tonkineum Pic, 1922
