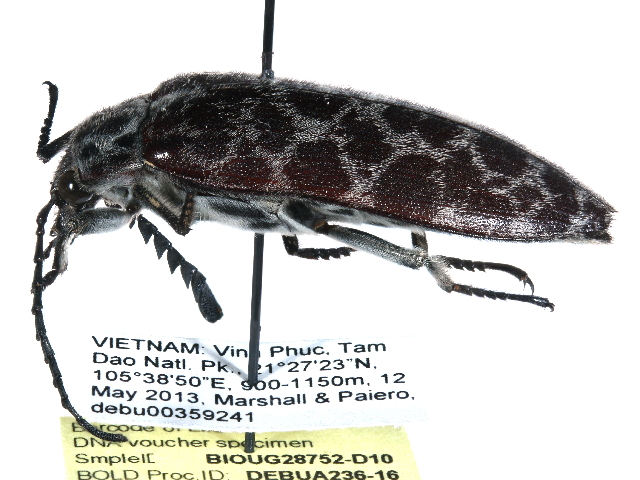
- A specimen, presumably of Eulichas, collected in Vietnam

Scientific classification
- Kingdom: Animalia
- Phylum: Arthropoda
- Clade: Pancrustacea
- Class: Insecta
- Order: Coleoptera
- Suborder: Polyphaga
- Infraorder: Elateriformia
- Superfamily: Byrrhoidea
- Family: Eulichadidae; Crowson, 1973

= Eulichadidae =

Eulichadidae Temporal range: Recent

Family of beetles

Eulichadidae is a family of beetles belonging to Elateriformia. There are two extant genera, Eulichas with several dozen species native to the Indomalayan realm of Asia, and Stenocolus, with a single species native to Western North America. The larvae are aquatic, with the larvae of Eulichas being found in sandy sediments of clean forest streams, while the larvae of Stenocolus are found under rocks and in leaf packs in low elevation streams and rivers. They are herbivorous or saprophagous with larval specimens of Eulichas having been found with wood particles in their stomachs, while the larvae of Stenocolus are known to feed on decaying roots and detritus. The adults are terrestrial, with specimens of Eulichas typically found using light, while specimens of Stenocolus are typically found in riparian vegetation, and are not attracted to light. Potential extinct genera have been described from Mesozoic rocks, but the placement of several of these taxa in the family is disputed.

== Genera ==
These two extant genera belong to the family Eulichadidae:

- Eulichas Jacobson, 1913 Asia
- Stenocolus LeConte, 1853 North America

=== Potential extinct genera ===
- Mesodascilla Martynov, 1926 Karabastau Formation, Kazakhstan, Late Jurassic (alternatively considered a member of Lasiosynidae)
- Cretasyne Yan, Wang & Zhang, 2013 Yixian Formation, China, Early Cretaceous (Aptian) (alternatively considered a member of Lasiosynidae)
- Mesaplus Hong, 1983 Haifanggou Formation, China, Middle Jurassic
