= Eurytomocharis eragrostidis =

Scientific classification
- Kingdom: Animalia
- Phylum: Arthropoda
- Class: Insecta
- Order: Hymenoptera
- Family: Eurytomidae
- Genus: Eurytomocharis
- Species: E. eragrostidis

Binomial name
- Eurytomocharis eragrostidis Howard, 1896

Synonyms
- Eurytoma eragrostidis

Species of wasp

Eurytomocharis eragrostidis is a species of wasp in the family Eurytomidae. It is a stem-boring pest that infests teff plants in the United States.
