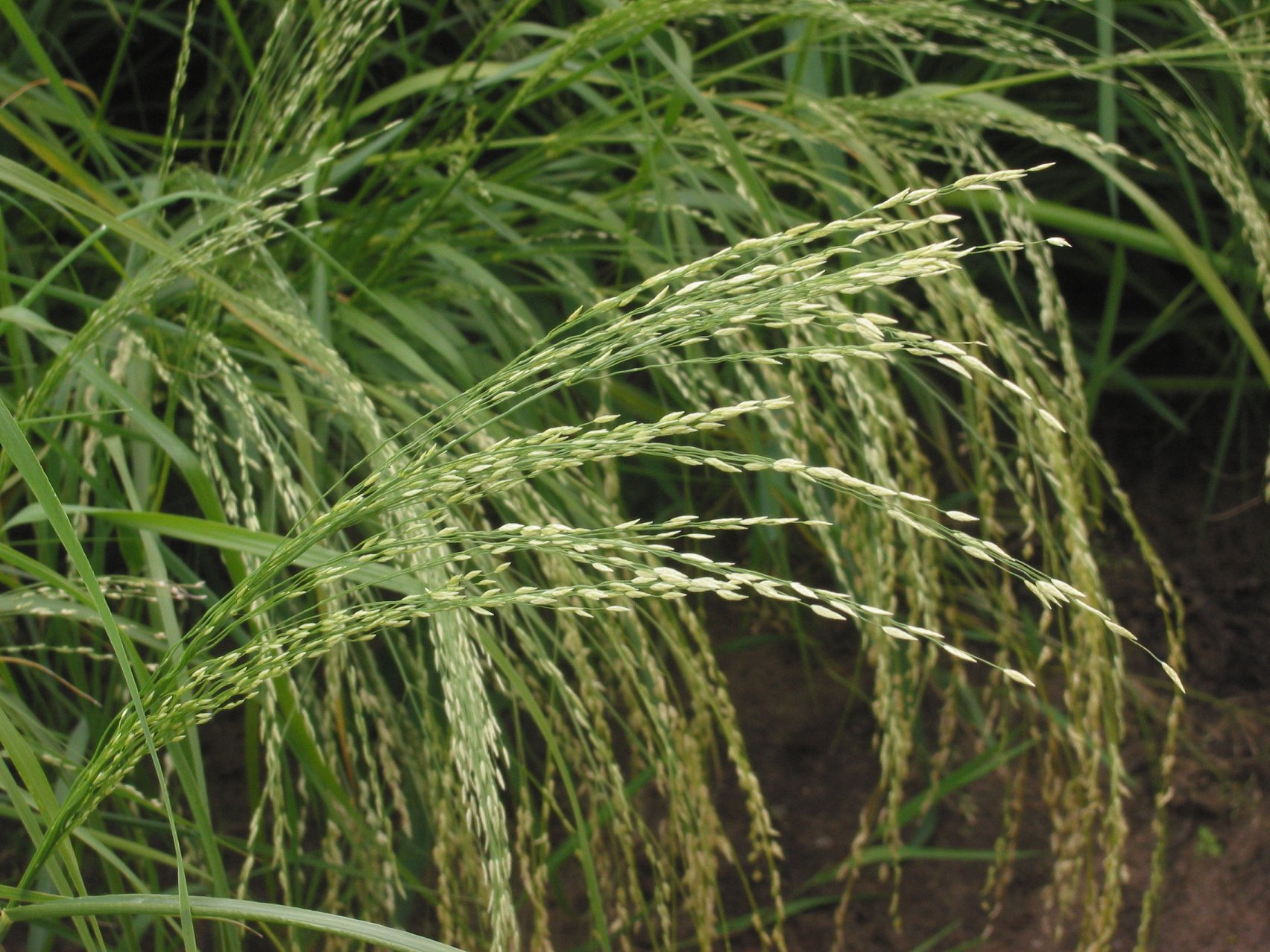

Scientific classification
- Kingdom: Plantae
- Clade: Tracheophytes
- Clade: Angiosperms
- Clade: Monocots
- Clade: Commelinids
- Order: Poales
- Family: Poaceae
- Subfamily: Chloridoideae
- Genus: Eragrostis
- Species: E. tef

Binomial name
- Eragrostis tef (Zucc.) Trotter

Synonyms
- Eragrostis abyssinica (Jacq.) Link

= Teff =

Edible annual grass native to Ethiopia and Eritrea

Teff (Amharic: ጤፍ), Eragrostis tef, also known as Williams lovegrass and annual bunch grass, is an annual species of lovegrass native to Eritrea and Ethiopia, where it originated in the highlands of both countries. It has been cultivated for its edible seeds, also called teff, since at least 1000 BCE and possibly as long ago as 4000 BCE. It is one of Ethiopia and Eritrea’s most important staple crops. As a modern crop, it is low-yielding and susceptible to lodging; the teff shoot fly is a major pest.

== Description ==
Eragrostis tef is a self pollinated tetraploid annual cereal grass. Teff is a C_{4} plant, which allows it to more efficiently fix carbon in drought and high temperatures, and is an intermediate between a tropical and temperate grass. The name teff is thought to originate from the Amharic word ጠፋ teffa, which means "(it is) lost". This probably refers to its tiny seeds, which have a diameter smaller than 1 mm (0.04 in). Teff is a fine-stemmed, tufted grass with large crowns and many tillers. Its roots are shallow, but develop a massive fibrous rooting system. The plant height varies depending on the cultivation variety and the environmental conditions.

== Distribution and habitat ==
Teff originated in the Ethiopian Highlands. It is mainly cultivated in Ethiopia and Eritrea. It is one of the most important staple crops in these two countries, where it is used to make injera. In 2016, Ethiopia grew more than 90 percent of the world's teff. It is marginally cultivated in India, Australia, Germany, the Netherlands, Spain, and the US, particularly in Idaho, California, Texas, and Nevada. Because of its very small seeds, a handful is enough to sow a large area. This makes teff particularly suited to a seminomadic lifestyle.

== Ecology ==
Teff is adaptable and can grow in various environments, at altitudes ranging from sea level to 3,200 metres (10,500 ft). However, it does not tolerate frost. Highest yields are obtained when teff is grown between 1,800 to 2,100 m (5,900 to 6,900 ft), with an annual rainfall of 450 to 550 mm (18 to 22 in), and daily temperatures range from 15 to 27 °C (59 to 81 °F). Yields decrease when annual rainfall falls below 250 mm and when the average temperature during pollination exceeds 22 °C. Despite its superficial root system, teff is quite drought-resistant thanks to its ability to regenerate rapidly after a moderate water stress and to produce fruits in a short time span. It is daylight-sensitive and flowers best with 12 hours of daylight. Teff is usually cultivated on pH-neutral soils, but can tolerate acid soil pH below 5. Teff has a C4 photosynthesis mechanism.

== Cultivation ==
As with many ancient crops, teff is quite adaptable; in particular, it can be cultivated both in dry environments and in wet conditions on marginal soils.

Teff is one of the most important cereals in Ethiopia and Eritrea. It is grown for its edible seeds and also for its straw to feed cattle. The seeds are very small, about a millimeter in length, and a thousand grains weigh approximately 0.3 g (1/128 oz). They can have a color from a white to a deep reddish brown. Teff is similar to millet and quinoa in cooking, but the seed is much smaller and cooks faster, using less fuel.

=== History ===
Teff is believed to have originated in Ethiopia between 4000 BCE and 1000 BCE. Genetic evidence points to E. pilosa as the most likely wild ancestor. A 19th-century identification of teff seeds from an ancient Egyptian site is now considered doubtful; the seeds in question (no longer available for study) are more likely of E. aegyptiaca, a common wild grass in Egypt.

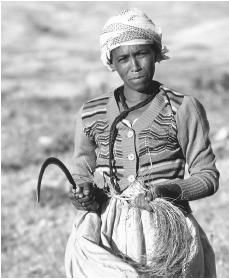
An Eritrean woman harvesting teff in Geshinashim, Eritrea

Teff is the most important commodity produced and consumed in Ethiopia where the flat pancake-like injera provides a livelihood for around 6.5 million small farmers in the country. In 2006, the Ethiopian government outlawed the export of raw teff, fearing export-driven domestic shortages like those suffered by South American countries after the explosion of quinoa consumption in Europe and the US. Processed teff, namely injera, could still be exported and was mainly bought by the Ethiopian and Eritrean diaspora living in northern Europe, the Middle East and North America. After a few years, fears of a domestic shortage of teff in the scenario of an international market opening decreased. Teff yields had been increasing by 40 to 50% over the five previous years while prices had remained stable in Ethiopia. This led the government to partially lift the export ban in 2015. To ensure that the domestic production would not be minimized, the export licenses have only been granted to 48 commercial farmers which had not cultivated the plant before. Lack of mechanization is a barrier to potential increases in teff exports. Yet the increasing demand, rising by 7–10% per year, and the subsequent increase in exports is encouraging the country to speed up the modernization of agriculture and is also boosting research. Because of its potential as an economic success, a few other countries, including the US and some European countries, are already cultivating teff and selling it on domestic markets.

=== Modern cultivation ===
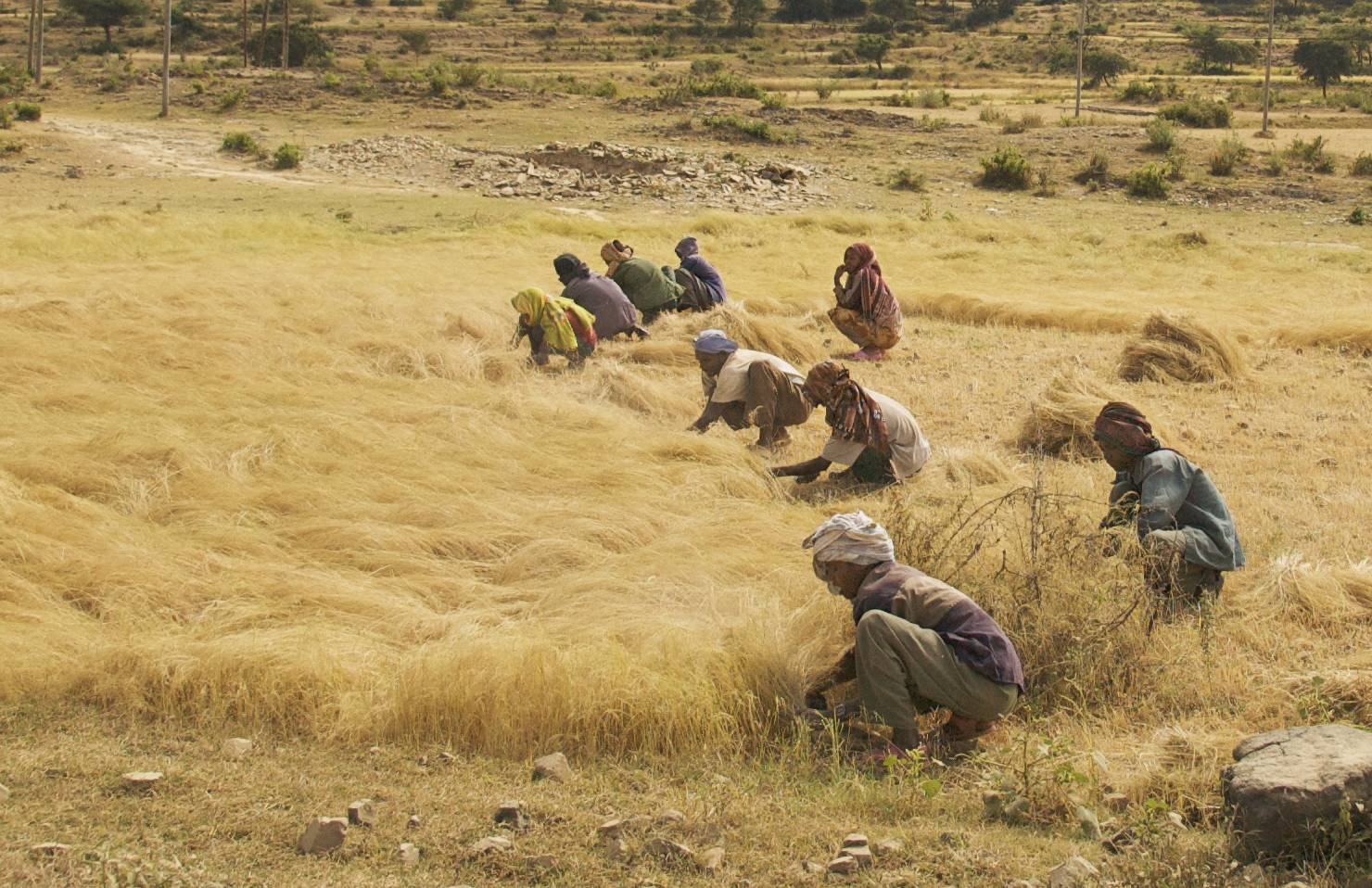
Traditional teff harvesting in Ethiopia, October 2007

The cultivation of teff is labor-intensive and the small size of its seeds makes it difficult to handle and transport without loss. In Ethiopia, teff is mostly produced during the main rain season, between July and November. It is known as an "emergency crop" because it is planted late in the season, when the temperatures are warmer, and most other crops have already been planted. Teff germination generally occurs 3–12 days after sowing. Optimal germination temperatures range from 15 to 35 °C; below 10 °C, germination almost does not occur. Teff is traditionally sown or broadcast by hand, on firm, humid soil. Usual sowing density ranges from 15 to 20 kg/ha, though farmers can sow up to 50 kg/ha, because the seeds are hard to spread equally and a higher sowing density helps to reduce weed competition at the early stage. Seeds are either left at the soil surface or slightly covered by a thin layer of soil, but must not be planted at a depth greater than 1 cm. The field can be subsequently rolled.

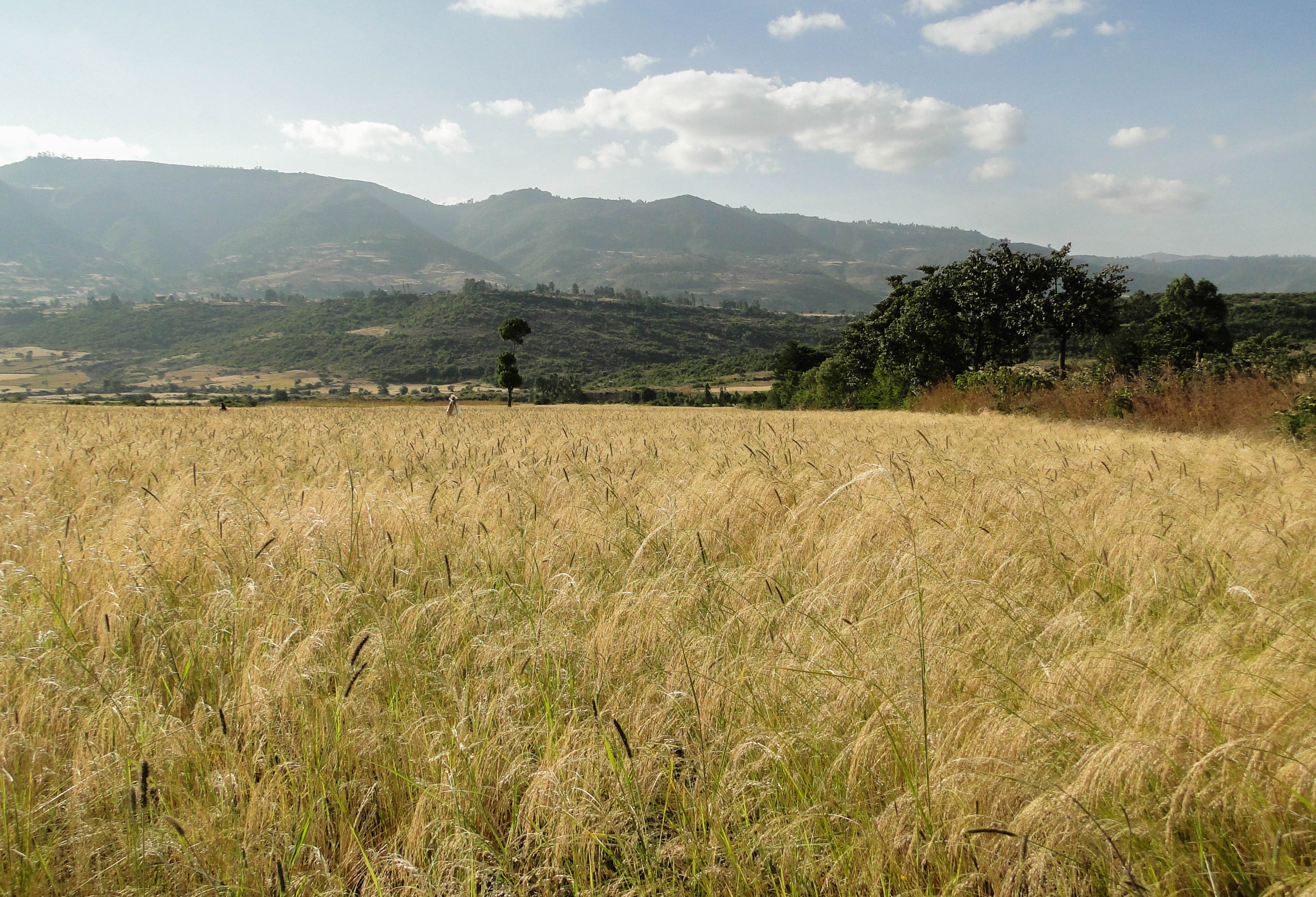
Field of teff

Recommended fertilization doses are 25–60 kg/ha for N, and 10–18 kg/ha for P. Teff responds more to nitrogen than to phosphorus; thus, high nitrogen inputs increase the biomass production and size of the plants, thereby increasing lodging. To avoid this, farmers can decrease nitrogen input, cultivate teff after a legume crop or adjust sowing time so that the rains have stopped when the crop reaches heading stage. In Ethiopia, teff is commonly used in crop rotations with other cereals and legumes.

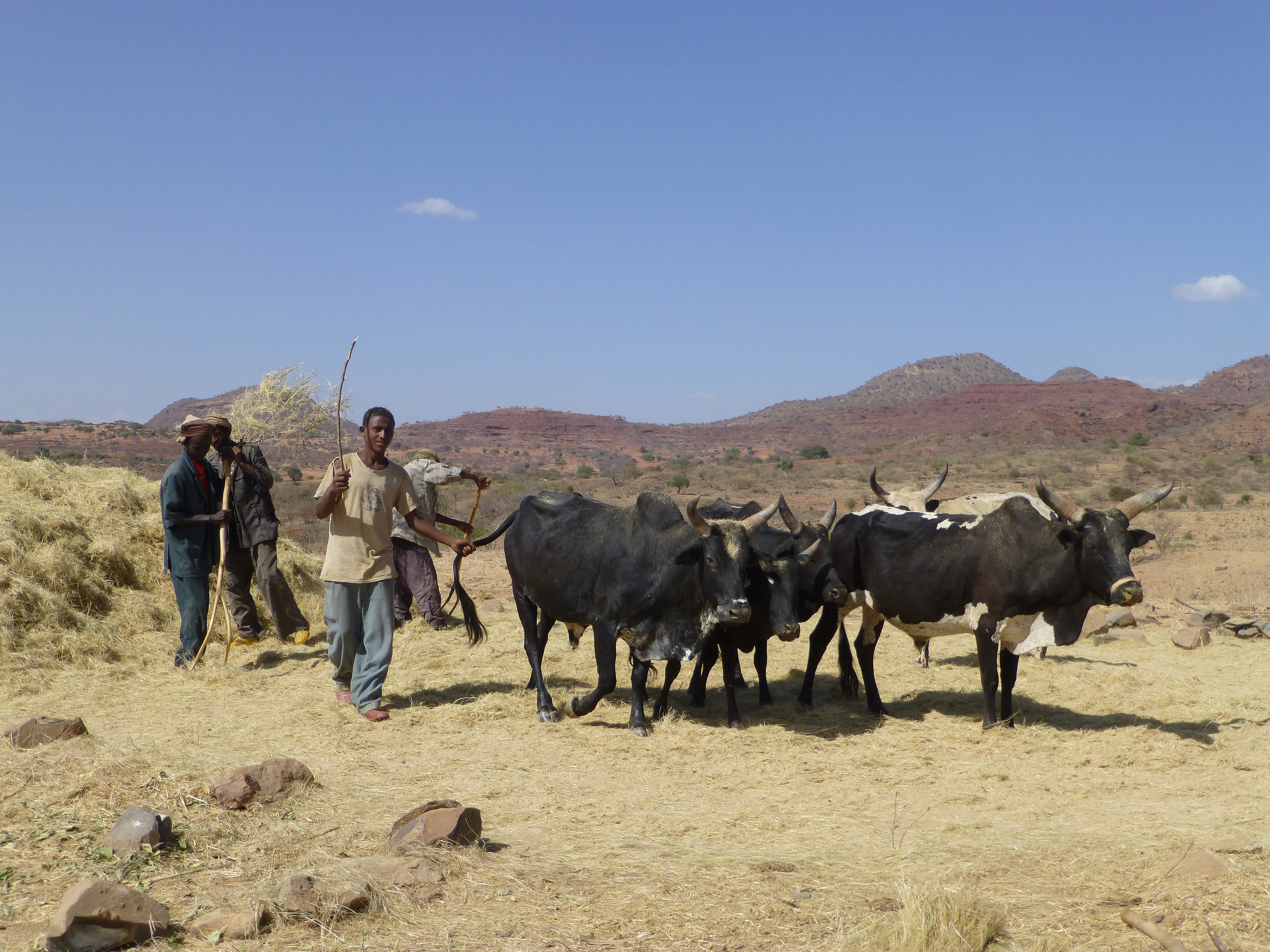
Teff threshed by using animals walking on the harvest

Teff is harvested 2–6 months after sowing, when the vegetative parts start to turn yellow. If teff is harvested past its maturation, seeds will fall off, especially in windy or rainy weather conditions. In Ethiopia, harvest lasts from November to January; harvest is usually done manually, with sickles. Farmers cut the plants at the soil surface, pile them up in the field and transport them to the threshing area. Teff is traditionally threshed by using animals walking on the harvest. Alternatively, some farmers rent threshing machines used for other cereals. The seeds are easy to store, as they are resistant to most pests during storage. Teff seeds can stay viable several years if direct contact with humidity and sun is avoided. Average yields in Ethiopia reach around two tonnes per ha. One single inflorescence can produce up to 1000 seeds, and one plant up to 10,000. Moreover, teff offers some promising opportunities for breeding programs: the first draft of the Eragrostis tef genome was published in 2014 and research institutes have started selecting for more resistant varieties. In 1996, the US National Research Council characterized teff as having the "potential to improve nutrition, boost food security, foster rural development and support sustainable landcare."

=== Challenges and prospects ===
The major challenges in teff production are its low yield and high susceptibility to lodging. Efforts to conventionally breed teff towards higher yields started in the 1950s and led to an average annual increase in yield of 0.8%.

High-yielding varieties, such as Quencho, were widely adopted by farmers in Ethiopia. Sequencing of the teff genome improved breeding, and an ethyl methanesulphonate (EMS)-mutagenized population was then used to breed the first semi-dwarf lodging-tolerant teff line, called kegne. In 2015, researchers tested 28 new teff varieties and identified three promising lines that generated yields of up to 4.7 tonnes per ha.

The "Teff Improvement Project" marked a milestone by releasing the first teff variety Tesfa to the Ethiopian markets in March 2017. Areas of further development include: "(i) improving productivity of teff; (ii) overcoming the lodging malady; (iii) developing climate-smart and appropriate crop and soil management options; (iv) developing tolerance to abiotic stresses such as drought and soil acidity; (v) developing suitable pre- and post-harvest mechanization technologies suitable for smallholder farmers as well as commercial farms; (vi) food processing and nutrition aspects with special attention to the development of different food recipes and value-added products; (vii) developing crop protection measures against diseases, insect pests and weeds; and (viii) improving or strengthening socio-economics and agricultural extension services."

=== Pests ===
The tef shoot fly (Atherigona hyalinipennis) is a major pest of the crop.

Other insect pests include:

- central shoot fly Delia arambourgi (seedling feeder)
- wello-bush cricket Decticoides brevipennis (flower feeder)
- red tef worm Mentaxya ignicollis
- tef epilachna beetle Chnootriba similis (leaf feeder); also transmits rice yellow mottle virus in rice
- chrysomelid black beetle Erlangerius niger (adults feed on developing grains and leaves)
- stem-boring wasp Eurytomocharis eragrostidis in the United States

== Uses ==
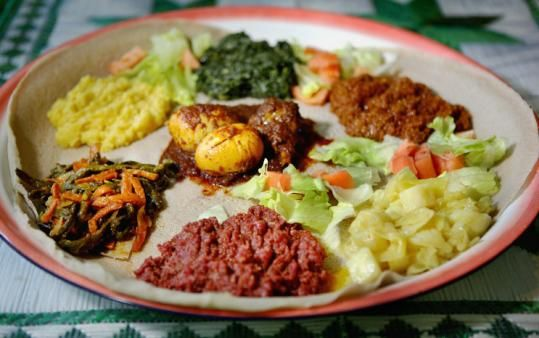
Injera served in a typical Ethiopian dish

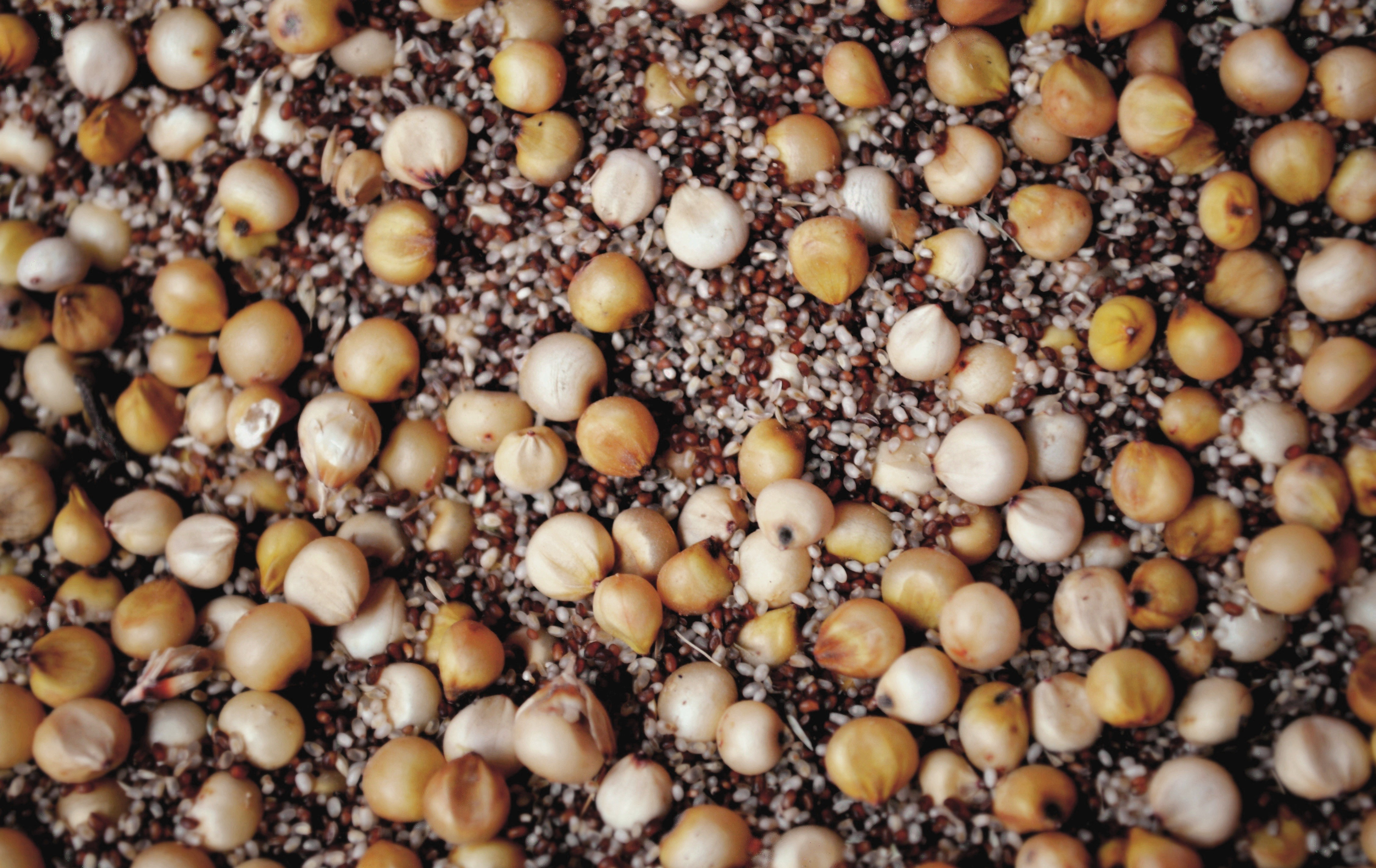
Teff (small grains) and sorghum (large grains), ingredients for tella

Teff is a multipurpose crop which has a high importance for the Ethiopian diet and culture. In Ethiopia, teff provides two-thirds of the daily protein intake. It is not only important for human nutrition, but also as fodder for livestock, or as building material. Teff is the main ingredient to prepare injera, a sourdough-risen flatbread. During meals, it is often eaten with meat or ground pulses. Sometimes it is also eaten as porridge. Moreover, teff can be used to prepare alcoholic drinks, called arak'e or katikalla or beer, called t'ella or fersso. Finally, due to its high mineral content, teff is also mixed with soybeans, chickpeas or other grains to manufacture baby foods.

Farmers in Ethiopia believe that consumers prefer white teff over darker varieties. As a nutritious fodder, teff is used to feed ruminants in Ethiopia and horses in the US. It is a source of animal feed, especially during the dry season, and it is often preferred over straw from other cereals. Teff grass can be used as a construction material when mixed with mud to plaster the walls of local grain storage facilities.

=== Nutrition ===
Teff, cooked
Nutritional value per 100 g (3.5 oz)
- Energy: 422 kJ (101 kcal)
- Carbohydrates: 19.86 g
- Dietary fiber: 2.8 g
- Fat: 0.65 g
- Protein: 3.87 g
Vitamins and minerals
Vitamins	Quantity %DV^{†}
Thiamine (B1)	15% 0.183 mg
Riboflavin (B2)	3% 0.033 mg
Niacin (B3)	6% 0.909 mg
Vitamin B6	6% 0.097 mg
Folate (B9)	5% 18 μg
Minerals	Quantity %DV^{†}
Calcium	4% 49 mg
Iron	11% 2.05 mg
Magnesium	12% 50 mg
Manganese	124% 2.86 mg
Phosphorus	10% 120 mg
Potassium	4% 107 mg
Sodium	0% 8 mg
Zinc	10% 1.11 mg
- Other constituents: Quantity
- Water: 74.93 g
- Link to USDA Database Entry
- ^{†}Percentages estimated using US recommendations for adults, except for potassium, which is estimated based on expert recommendation from the National Academies.

Uncooked teff is 9% water, 73% carbohydrates, 13% protein, and 2% fat. Cooked teff is 75% water, 20% carbohydrates, 4% protein, and less than 1% fat. A 100-gram (3 1/2-ounce) reference serving of cooked teff provides 420 kilojoules (101 kilocalories) of food energy, is a rich source of protein, dietary fiber, and manganese, and contains moderate amounts of thiamin, phosphorus, iron, magnesium, and zinc. The fiber content in teff is also higher than in most other cereals.

Teff is gluten free, and a method has been developed to process teff into a flour with a wider range of baking applications, such as for bread and pasta.

Teff, uncooked
Nutritional value per 100 g (3.5 oz)
- Energy: 1,536 kJ (367 kcal)
- Carbohydrates: 73.13 g
- Dietary fiber: 8.0 g
- Fat: 2.38 g
- Protein: 13.30 g
Vitamins and minerals
Vitamins	Quantity %DV^{†}
Thiamine (B1)	33% 0.390 mg
Riboflavin (B2)	21% 0.270 mg
Niacin (B3)	21% 03.363 mg
Vitamin B6	28% 0.482 mg
Minerals	Quantity %DV^{†}
Calcium	14% 180 mg
Iron	42% 7.63 mg
Magnesium	44% 184 mg
Phosphorus	34% 429 mg
Potassium	14% 427 mg
Sodium	1% 12 mg
Zinc	33% 3.63 mg
- Other constituents: Quantity
- Water: 8.82g
- Link to USDA Database Entry
- ^{†}Percentages estimated using US recommendations for adults, except for potassium, which is estimated based on expert recommendation from the National Academies.

Amino-acid	Concentration in raw teff, in g/16gN
Lysine	3.68
Isoleucine	4.07
Leucine	8.53
Valine	5.46
Phenylalaline	5.69
Tyrosine	3.84
Tryptophan	1.30
Threonine	4.32
Histidine	3.21
Arginine	5.15
Methionine	4.06
Cystine	2.50
Asparagine + Aspartic Acid	6.4
Proline	8.2
Serine	4.1
Glutamine + Glutamic Acid	21.8
Glycine	3.1
Alanine	10.1

== Patent and bio-piracy ==
In 2003, a Dutch company, Health and Performance Food International (HPFI), paired with the Ethiopian Institute of Biodiversity Conservation to introduce teff to European markets. The agreement was for Ethiopia to provide HPFI with a dozen strains of teff to market globally, and the two entities would split the proceeds. HPFI's CEO, Jans Roosjen, took out two patents on teff in 2003 and 2007, claiming that his way of milling and storing the flour was unique. HPFI went bankrupt in 2009, allowing Roosjen to utilize those patents and the marketing rights for the grain while being freed from the original agreement with Ethiopia. Ethiopia only received 4,000 euros over five years of collaboration. Roosjen sued a Dutch bakery company, Bakels, for patent infringement through selling teff baked goods. The Dutch patent office declared the patent void, stating that the methods used to bake and mix flours were "general professional knowledge". Teff is inherent to Ethiopia's national culture and identity. The government of Ethiopia has expressed intent to hold Roosjen accountable under patent law, and to regain ownership over international markets of its most important food.

== Allergy ==
There is a documented case of a 29-year-old employee at an organic food production facility who was confirmed to be hypersensitive to teff. The allergy developed through oral exposure during routine product sampling (cereal and bread made from teff flour) at the workplace. Within 5 minutes of exposure to the allergen, symptoms such as a burning sensation in the mouth, tongue swelling, and swallowing difficulties appeared. The man described was also found to have an isolated allergy to milk thistle, as well as an allergy to wasp venom and certain raw fruits and vegetables. Given the growing popularity of teff as a substitute for traditional grains in a gluten-free diet, it can be assumed that hypersensitivity to this plant will be diagnosed more and more frequently.

== See also ==
- Weeping lovegrass
