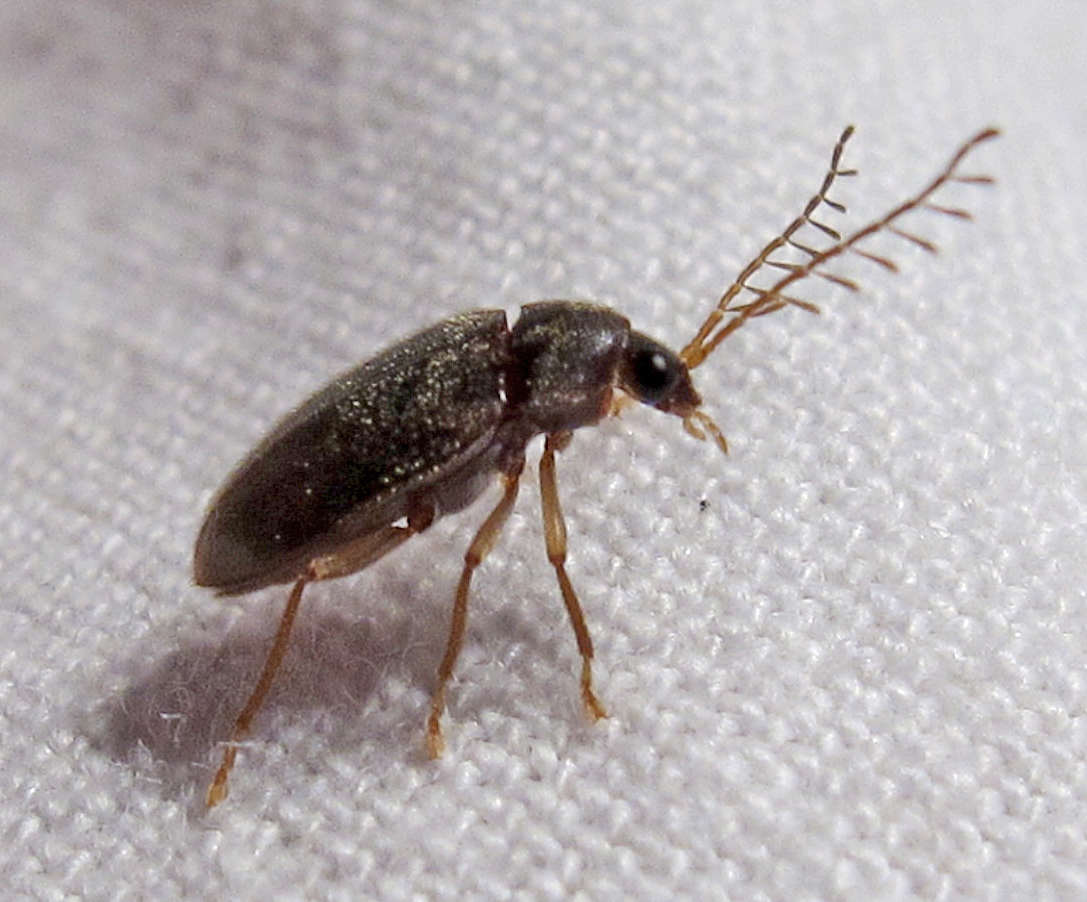

Scientific classification
- Domain: Eukaryota
- Kingdom: Animalia
- Phylum: Arthropoda
- Class: Insecta
- Order: Coleoptera
- Suborder: Polyphaga
- Infraorder: Elateriformia
- Family: Ptilodactylidae
- Genus: Ptilodactyla
- Species: P. serricollis

Binomial name
- Ptilodactyla serricollis (Say, 1823)

= Ptilodactyla serricollis =

Species of beetle

Ptilodactyla serricollis is a species of toe-winged beetle in the family Ptilodactylidae. It is found in North America.
