= Paralichus =

Scientific classification
- Domain: Eukaryota
- Kingdom: Animalia
- Phylum: Arthropoda
- Class: Insecta
- Order: Coleoptera
- Suborder: Polyphaga
- Infraorder: Elateriformia
- Family: Ptilodactylidae
- Genus: Paralichus; White, 1859

Genus of beetles

Paralichus is a genus of toe-winged beetles in the family Ptilodactylidae. There is one described species in Paralichus, P. trivittus.
