= Anchytarsus =

Scientific classification
- Kingdom: Animalia
- Phylum: Arthropoda
- Clade: Pancrustacea
- Class: Insecta
- Order: Coleoptera
- Suborder: Polyphaga
- Infraorder: Elateriformia
- Family: Ptilodactylidae
- Subfamily: Anchytarsinae
- Genus: Anchytarsus; Guérin-Méneville, 1843

Genus of beetles

Anchytarsus is a genus of toe-winged beetles in the family Ptilodactylidae. There are at least two described species in Anchytarsus.

== Species ==
These two species belong to the genus Anchytarsus:

- Anchytarsus bicolor (Melsheimer, 1846)
- Anchytarsus folliculipalpus
