= Stenocolus =

Scientific classification
- Kingdom: Animalia
- Phylum: Arthropoda
- Class: Insecta
- Order: Coleoptera
- Suborder: Polyphaga
- Infraorder: Elateriformia
- Family: Eulichadidae
- Genus: Stenocolus; LeConte, 1853

Genus of beetles

Stenocolus is a genus of forest stream beetles in the family Eulichadidae. There is one described species in Stenocolus, S. scutellaris.
