= Mentaxya ignicollis =

Scientific classification
- Kingdom: Animalia
- Phylum: Arthropoda
- Class: Insecta
- Order: Lepidoptera
- Superfamily: Noctuoidea
- Family: Noctuidae
- Genus: Mentaxya
- Species: M. ignicollis

Binomial name
- Mentaxya ignicollis (Walker, 1857)

Species of moth

Mentaxya ignicollis, the red teff worm, is a species of moth in the family Noctuidae. It is a pest of teff in Ethiopia.
