= Decticoides brevipennis =

Scientific classification
- Kingdom: Animalia
- Phylum: Arthropoda
- Class: Insecta
- Order: Orthoptera
- Suborder: Ensifera
- Family: Tettigoniidae
- Genus: Decticoides
- Species: D. brevipennis

Binomial name
- Decticoides brevipennis Ragge, 1977

Species of grasshopper

Decticoides brevipennis, the Wello-bush cricket, is a species of insect in the family Tettigoniidae. It is a pest of teff in Africa.
