= Chnootriba similis =

Scientific classification
- Kingdom: Animalia
- Phylum: Arthropoda
- Clade: Pancrustacea
- Class: Insecta
- Order: Coleoptera
- Suborder: Polyphaga
- Infraorder: Cucujiformia
- Family: Coccinellidae
- Genus: Chnootriba
- Species: C. similis

Binomial name
- Chnootriba similis (Thunberg, 1781)

Synonyms
- Coccinella similis

Species of beetle

Chnootriba similis, the teff epilachna beetle, is a species of lady beetle. It is a pest of teff in Ethiopia and feeds on its leaves.
