= Anchycteis =

Scientific classification
- Domain: Eukaryota
- Kingdom: Animalia
- Phylum: Arthropoda
- Class: Insecta
- Order: Coleoptera
- Suborder: Polyphaga
- Infraorder: Elateriformia
- Family: Ptilodactylidae
- Subfamily: Anchytarsinae
- Genus: Anchycteis; Horn, 1880

Genus of beetles

Anchycteis is a genus of toe-winged beetles in the family Ptilodactylidae. There is one described species in Anchycteis, A. velutina.
