= Lachnodactyla =

Scientific classification
- Domain: Eukaryota
- Kingdom: Animalia
- Phylum: Arthropoda
- Class: Insecta
- Order: Coleoptera
- Suborder: Polyphaga
- Infraorder: Elateriformia
- Family: Ptilodactylidae
- Subfamily: Ptilodactylinae
- Genus: Lachnodactyla; Champion, 1897

Genus of beetles

Lachnodactyla is a genus of toe-winged beetles in the family Ptilodactylidae. There are at least two described species in Lachnodactyla.

== Species ==
These two species belong to the genus Lachnodactyla:

- Lachnodactyla arizonica Schaeffer, 1906
- Lachnodactyla texana Schaeffer, 1906
