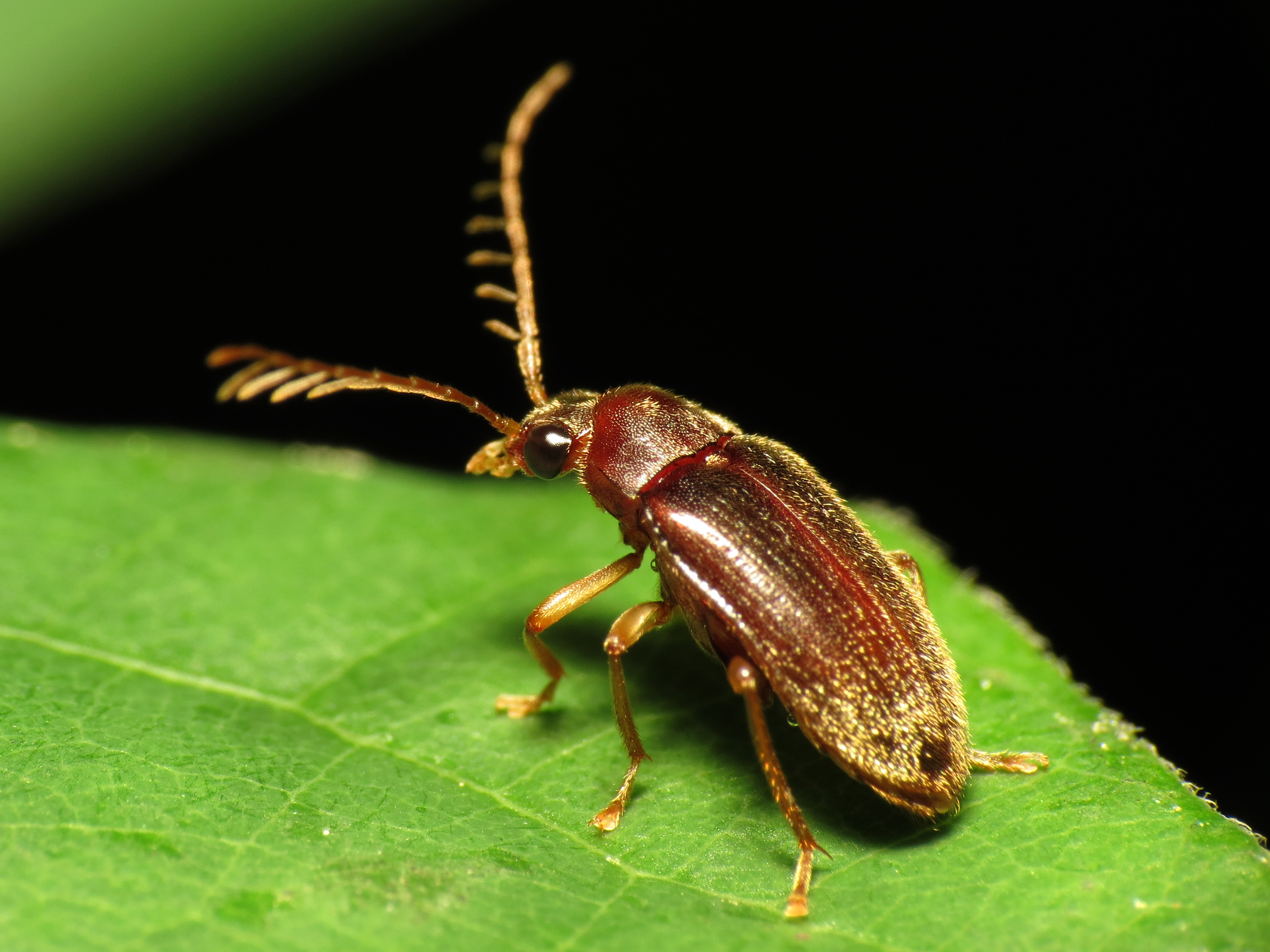

Scientific classification
- Kingdom: Animalia
- Phylum: Arthropoda
- Class: Insecta
- Order: Coleoptera
- Suborder: Polyphaga
- Infraorder: Elateriformia
- Family: Ptilodactylidae
- Subfamily: Ptilodactylinae
- Genus: Ptilodactyla; Illiger, 1807

= Ptilodactyla =

Genus of beetles

Ptilodactyla is a genus of toe-winged beetles in the family Ptilodactylidae. Around 380 species are described in Ptilodactyla, about 70% of all species in the family. However, it may be subject to divisions in the future, and there are likely many more undescribed species.

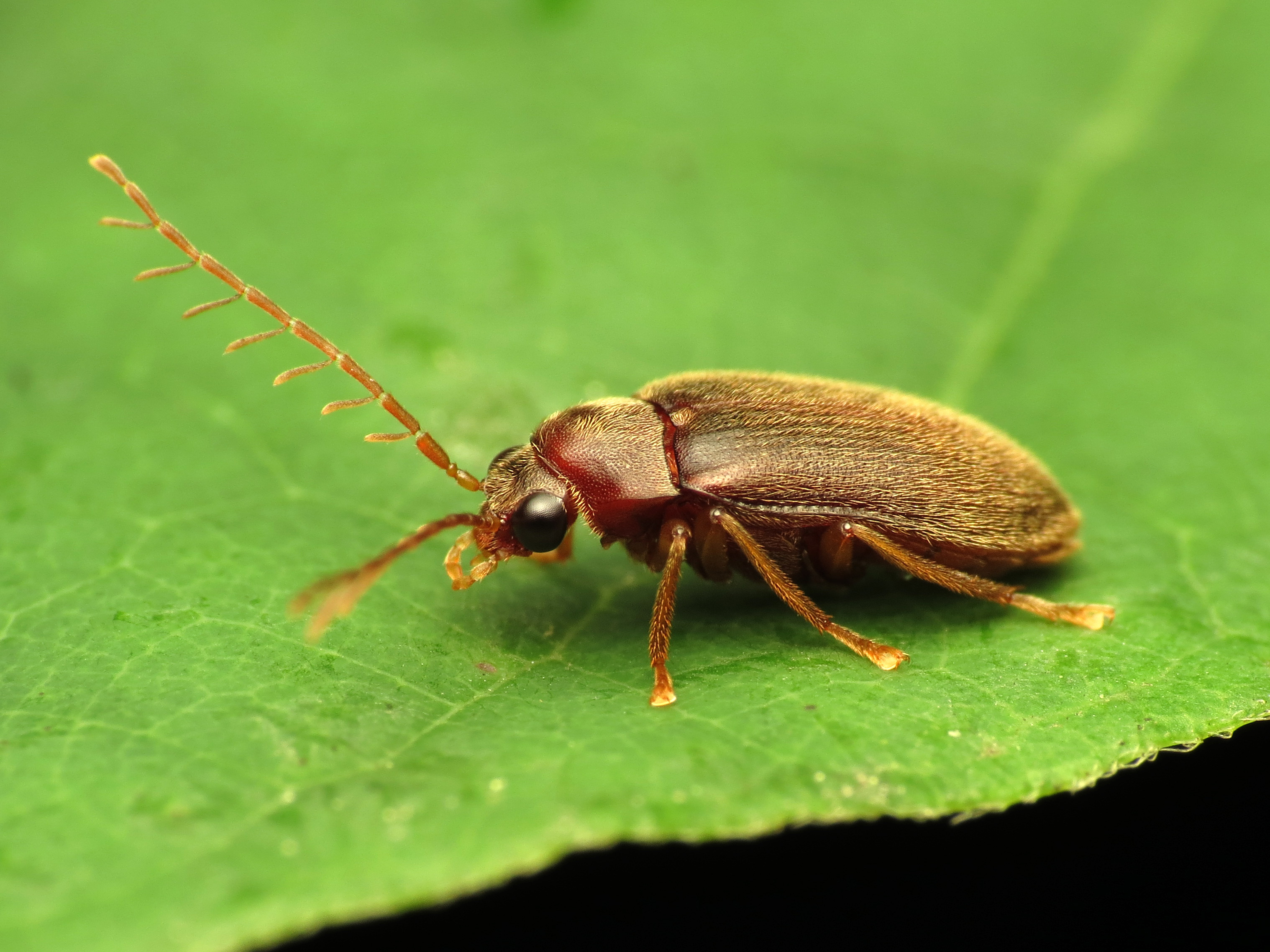

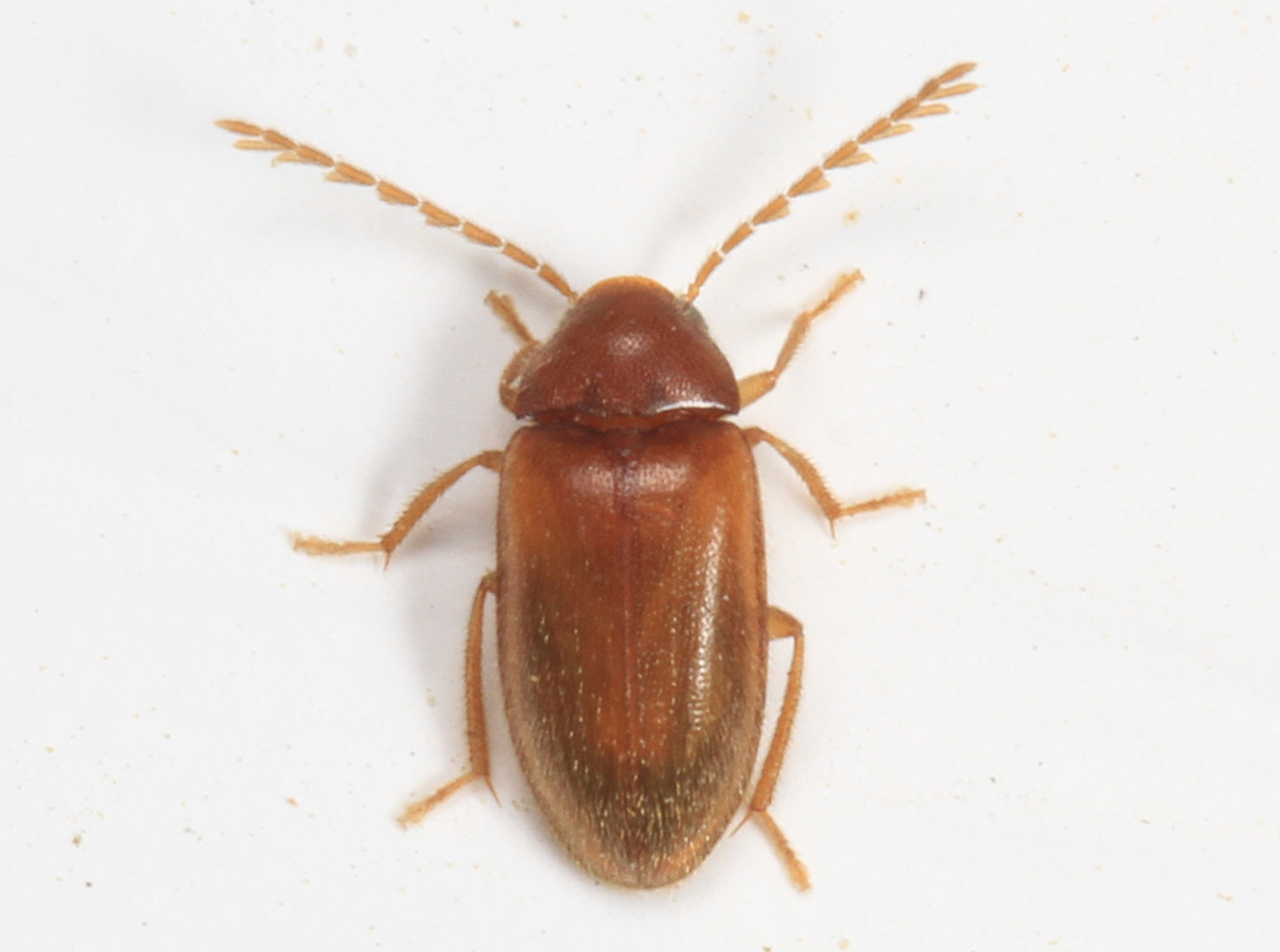

== Species ==
- Ptilodactyla acuta Johnson & Freytag, 1978
- Ptilodactyla amamioshimana
- Ptilodactyla angustata Horn, 1880
- Ptilodactyla atra Laporte de Castelnau, 1836
- Ptilodactyla carinata Johnson & Freytag, 1978
- Ptilodactyla castanea Laporte de Castelnau, 1836
- Ptilodactyla corporaali Pic, 1923
- Ptilodactyla emarginata Chevrolat, 1870
- Ptilodactyla equilobata Chapin, 1927
- Ptilodactyla escalonai Lawrence et al., 2024
- Ptilodactyla exotica Chapin, 1927
- Ptilodactyla formosana Nakane, 1996
- Ptilodactyla guadelupensis Legros, 1947
- Ptilodactyla humeralis Motschulsky, 1863
- Ptilodactyla hyperglotta Johnson & Freytag, 1982
- Ptilodactyla isoloba Johnson & Freytag, 1982
- Ptilodactyla lacordairei Laporte de Castelnau, 1836
- Ptilodactyla macrophthalma Legros, 1947
- Ptilodactyla militaris Chevrolat, 1870
- Ptilodactyla nanoderma Johnson & Freytag, 1982
- Ptilodactyla nitens Laporte de Castelnau, 1840
- Ptilodactyla nitida De Geer, 1775
- Ptilodactyla nitidissima Pic, 1927
- Ptilodactyla obscuriceps Pic, 1923
- Ptilodactyla ramea Lewis, 1895
- Ptilodactyla rouyeri
- Ptilodactyla scabrosa Champion, 1924
- Ptilodactyla sericea Laporte de Castelnau, 1836
- Ptilodactyla serricollis (Say, 1823)
- Ptilodactyla sinensis
- Ptilodactyla strangulata Pic, 1924
- Ptilodactyla thoracica Laporte de Castelnau, 1840
