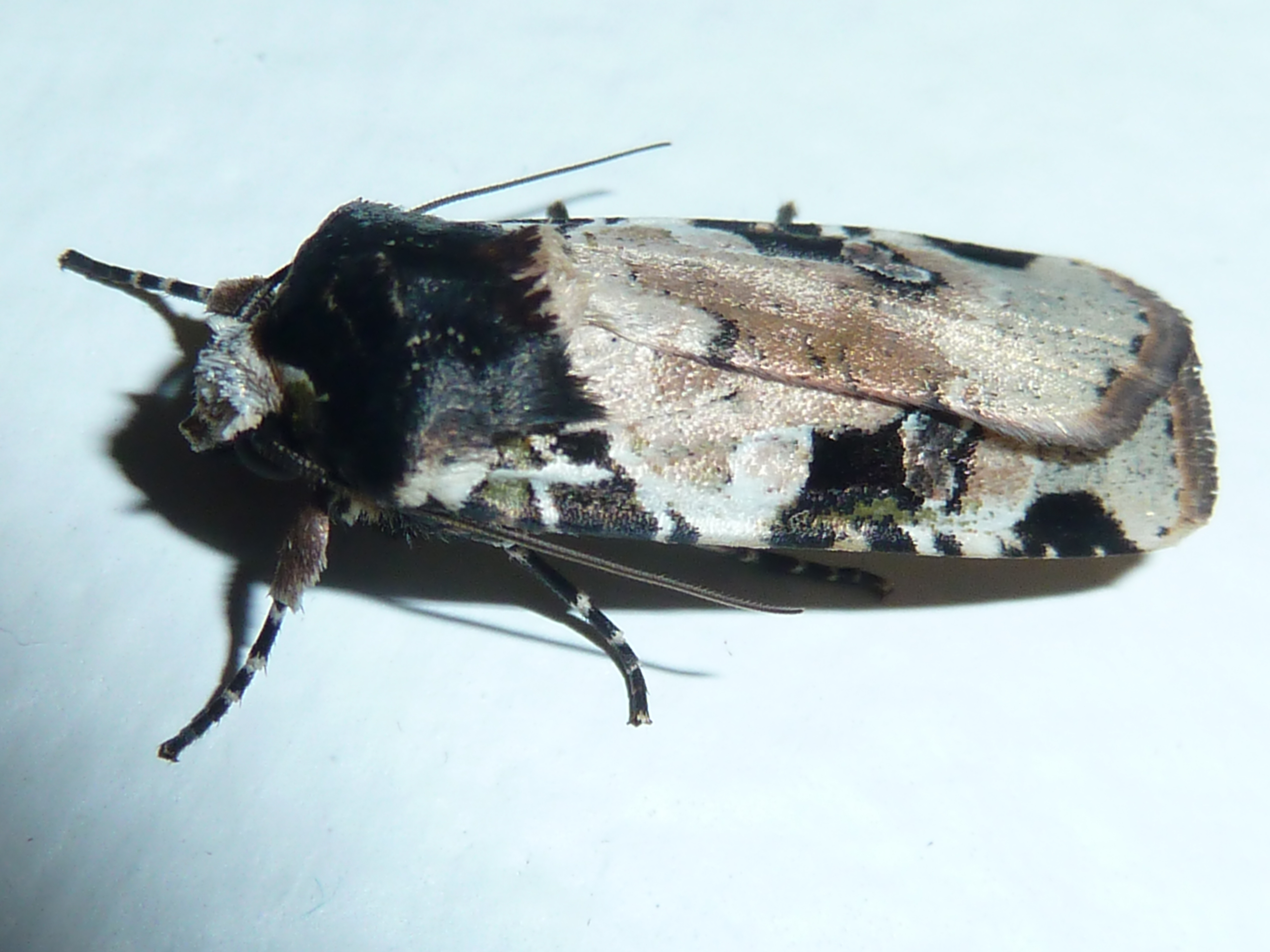
- M. albifrons in South Africa

Scientific classification
- Domain: Eukaryota
- Kingdom: Animalia
- Phylum: Arthropoda
- Class: Insecta
- Order: Lepidoptera
- Superfamily: Noctuoidea
- Family: Noctuidae
- Subfamily: Noctuinae
- Genus: Mentaxya; Geyer, 1837

= Mentaxya =

Genus of moths

Mentaxya is a genus of moths of the family Noctuidae.

== Species ==
Some species of this genus are:

- Mentaxya albifrons (Geyer, 1837)
- Mentaxya arabica Wiltshire, 1980
- Mentaxya atritegulata (Hampson, 1902)
- Mentaxya basilewskyi (Berio, 1955)
- Mentaxya bergeri (Berio, 1955)
- Mentaxya bruneli Laporte, 1975
- Mentaxya camerunensis Laporte, 1973
- Mentaxya comorana Viette, 1960
- Mentaxya cumulata (Walker, 1865)
- Mentaxya dallolmoi Berio, 1972
- Mentaxya fletcheri (Berio, 1955)
- Mentaxya fouqueae Laporte, 1974
- Mentaxya grisea Laporte, 1973
- Mentaxya ignicollis (Walker, 1857)
- Mentaxya ikondae Berio, 1972
- Mentaxya inconstans Laporte, 1984
- Mentaxya indigna (Herrich-Schäffer, 1854
- Mentaxya lacteifrons Laporte, 1984
- Mentaxya leroyi (Berio, 1955)
- Mentaxya minor Berio, 1977
- Mentaxya muscosa Geyer, 1837
- Mentaxya nigromaculata Laporte, 1984
- Mentaxya nimba Laporte, 1972
- Mentaxya palmistarum (de Joannis, 1932)
- Mentaxya percurvata (Berio, 1955)
- Mentaxya pujoli Laporte, 1973
- Mentaxya pyroides Berio, 1972
- Mentaxya quadrata Berio, 1974
- Mentaxya reninigra Laporte, 1977
- Mentaxya rimosa (Guenée, 1852)
- Mentaxya sandrae Laporte, 1974
- Mentaxya sexalata Viette, 1958
- Mentaxya strictirena Berio, 1974
- Mentaxya suffusalis Laporte, 1973
- Mentaxya thomasi Laporte, 1984
- Mentaxya torrianii Laporte, 1977
- Mentaxya trisellata Viette, 1958
- Mentaxya trisellatoides Laporte, 1973
- Mentaxya vuattouxi Laporte, 1972
