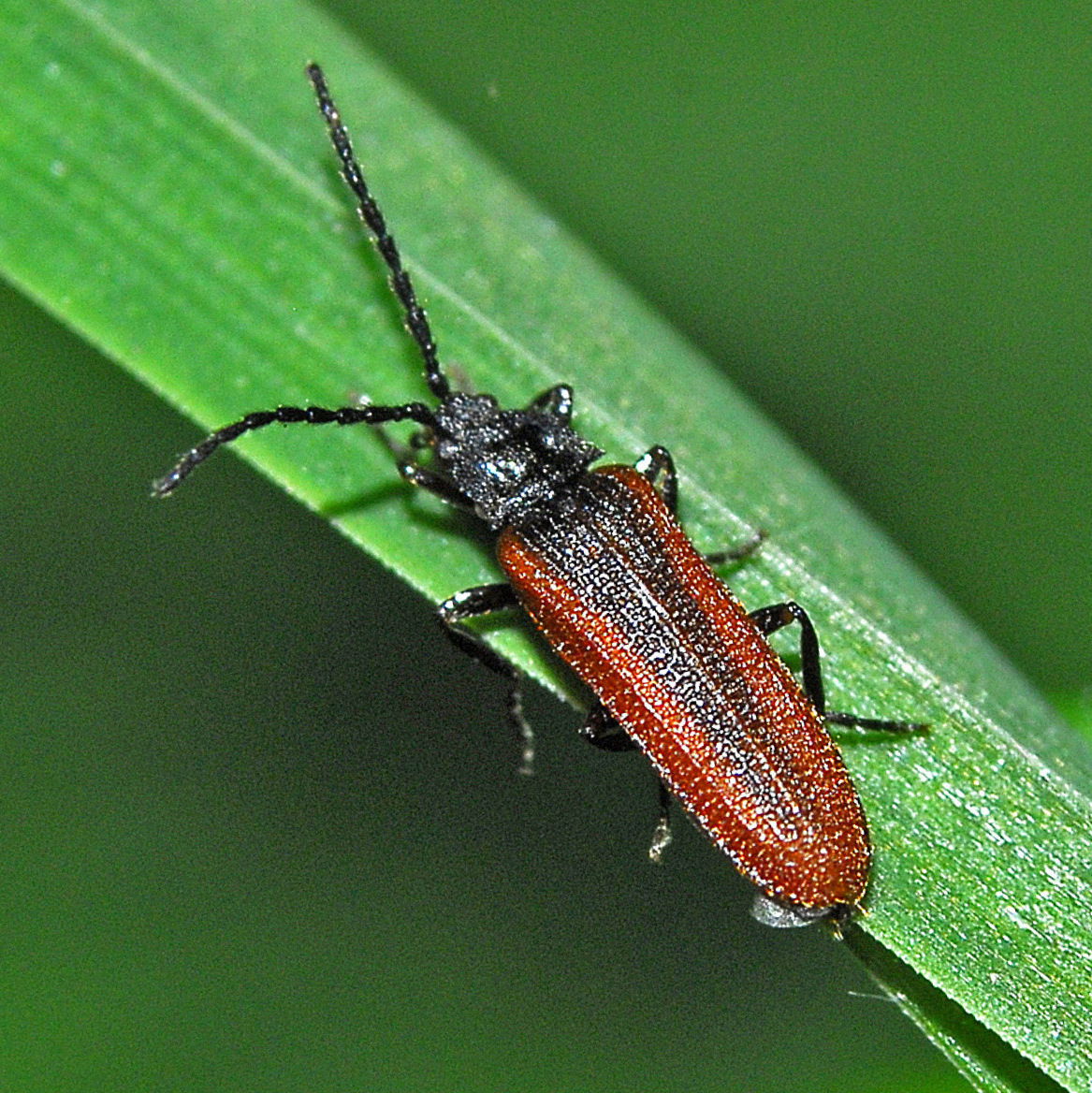
- Omalisus fontisbellaquaei

Scientific classification
- Domain: Eukaryota
- Kingdom: Animalia
- Phylum: Arthropoda
- Class: Insecta
- Order: Coleoptera
- Suborder: Polyphaga
- Infraorder: Elateriformia
- Family: Elateridae
- Subfamily: Omalisinae
- Genus: Omalisus; Geoffroy, 1762

Synonyms
- Homalisus Illiger, 1801; Homalysus Gistl, 1848; Omalysus O.F. Müller, 1764

= Omalisus =

Genus of beetles

Omalisus is a genus of beetle belonging to the family Elateridae.

== Species ==
Species within this genus include:

- Omalisus fontisbellaquaei Geoffroy, 1785
- Omalisus nicaeensis Lesne, 1921
- Omalisus sanguinipennis Laporte de Castelnau, 1840
- Omalisus taurinensis Baudi, 1871
- Omalisus victoris Mulsant, 1852
