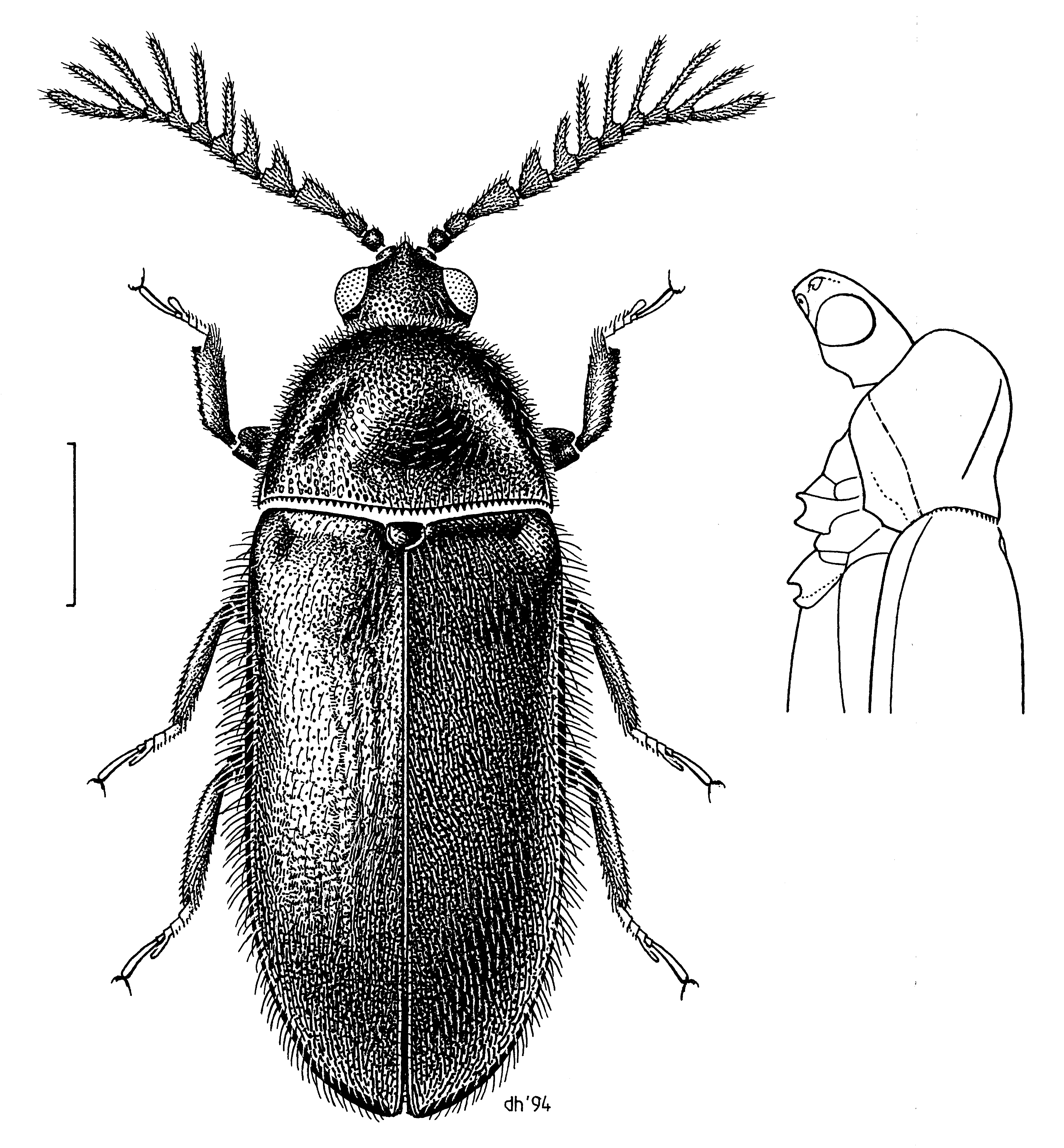
- Brounia thoracica

Scientific classification
- Kingdom: Animalia
- Phylum: Arthropoda
- Clade: Pancrustacea
- Class: Insecta
- Order: Coleoptera
- Suborder: Polyphaga
- Infraorder: Elateriformia
- Superfamily: Byrrhoidea
- Family: Chelonariidae; Blanchard, 1845

= Chelonariidae =

Chelonariidae Temporal range: Barremian–Recent

Family of beetles

Chelonariidae or turtle beetles is a family of beetles in the superfamily Byrrhoidea. It was described by Blanchard in 1845. There are 3 genera with around 300 described species. Little is known of their ecology, though it seems they are associated with the roots of orchids and the nests of ants and termites. Their exoskeletons are heavily sclerotised and their limbs can be effectively retracted into their bodies due to the presence of socket-like cavities. Adult specimens have seed-shaped bodies that are typically colored brown or black with lighter patches.

== Genera ==
- Brounia Sharp, 1878 (New Zealand)
- Chelonarium Fabricius, 1801 (Americas, Asia, Australia, with fossil species known from European Baltic amber)
- Pseudochelonarium Pic, 1916 (South & Southeast Asia, New Guinea)
- †Eochelonarium Kirejtshuk in Kirejtshuk and Azar 2013 Lebanese amber, Early Cretaceous (Barremian)

== Gallery ==
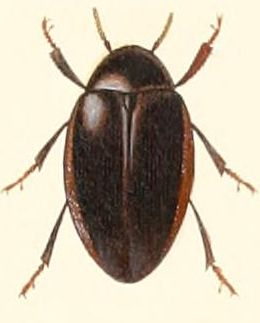
Chelonarium haemorrhoum

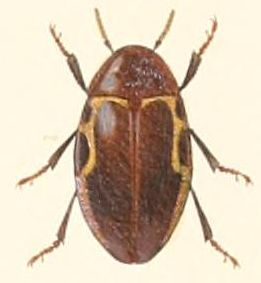
Chelonarium ornatum
