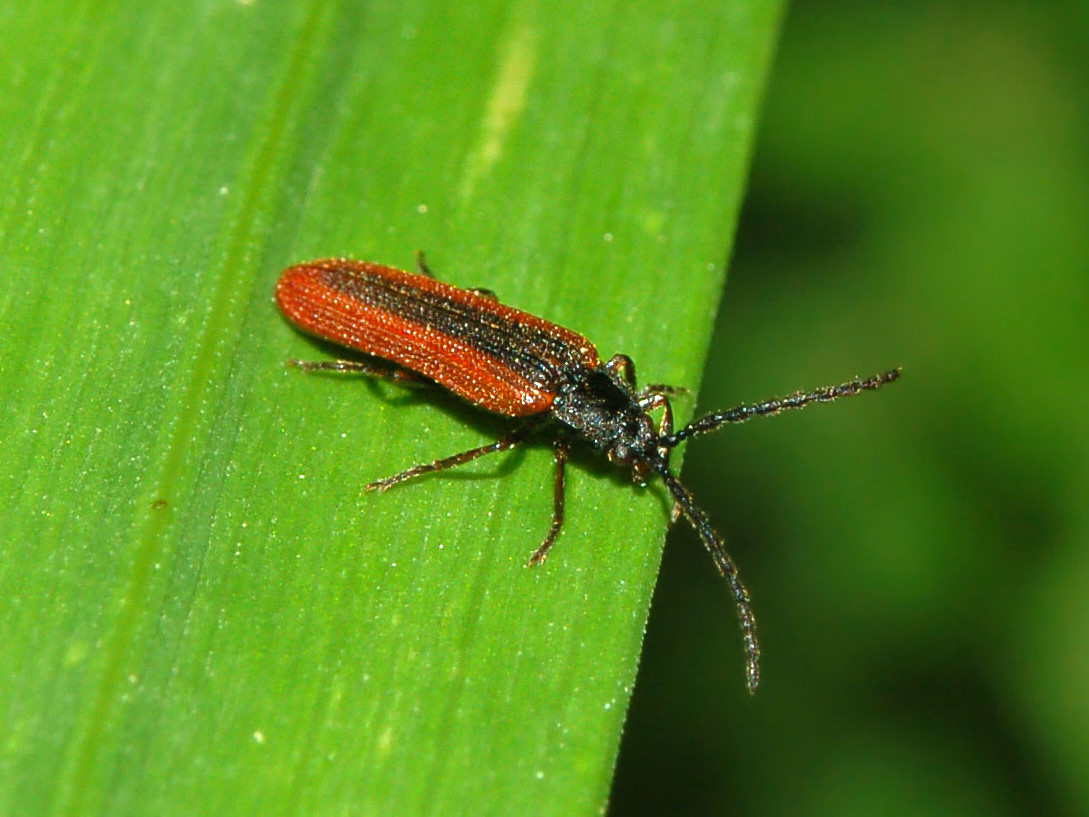

Scientific classification
- Kingdom: Animalia
- Phylum: Arthropoda
- Clade: Pancrustacea
- Class: Insecta
- Order: Coleoptera
- Suborder: Polyphaga
- Infraorder: Elateriformia
- Family: Elateridae
- Genus: Omalisus
- Species: O. fontisbellaquaei

Binomial name
- Omalisus fontisbellaquaei Geoffroy, 1785

Synonyms
- Homalisus nigricans Schilsky, 1888; Omalysus fontisbellaquei (Geoffroy) Müller, 1764; Phosphaenus rougeti J. E. Olivier, 1884

= Omalisus fontisbellaquaei =

Species of beetle

Omalisus fontisbellaquaei is a species of beetle belonging to the family Elateridae.

These beetles are mainly present in Austria, Belgium, Bulgaria, France, Germany, Italy, Switzerland and in the Near East.

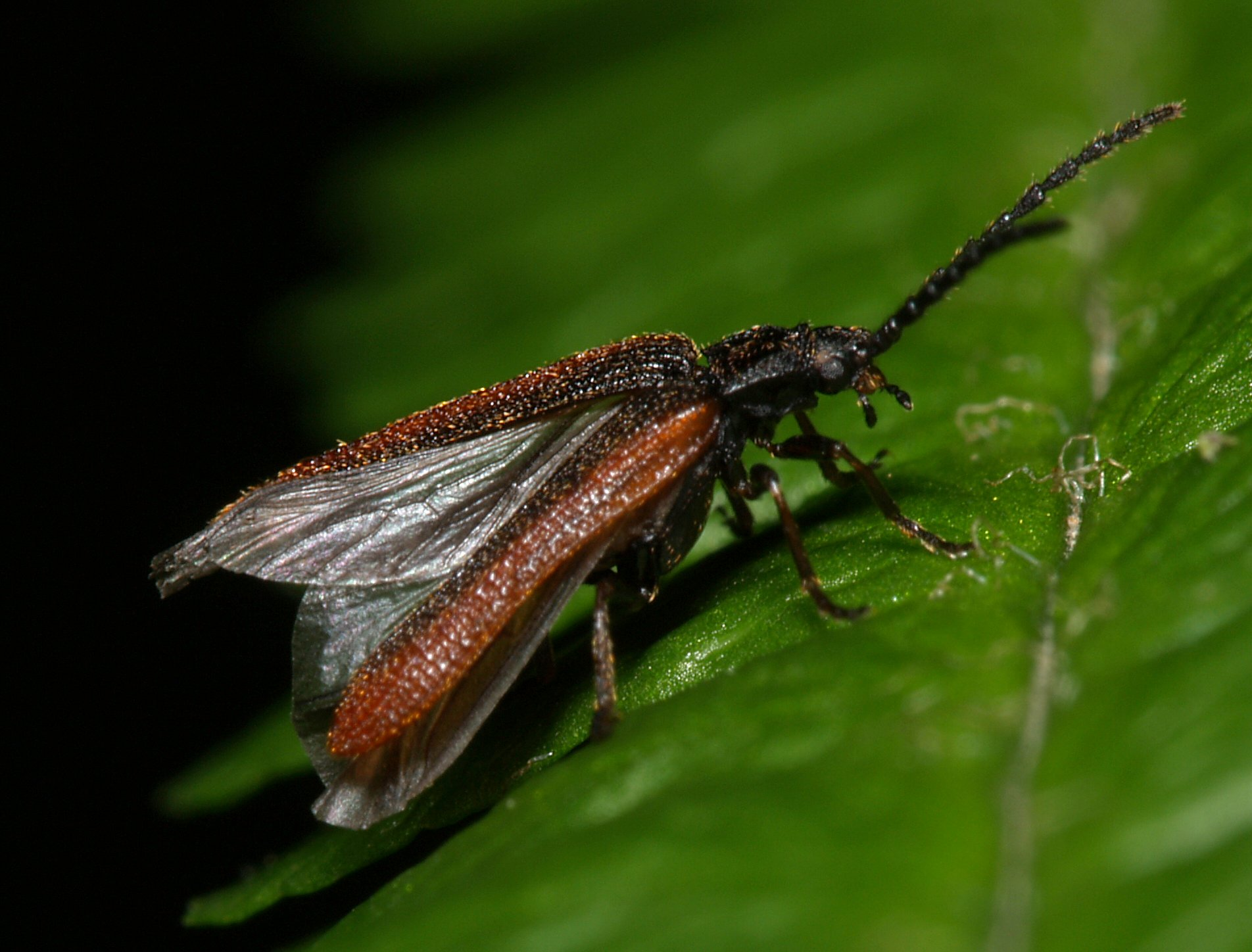
Omalisus fontisbellaquaei – lateral view – wings spread

The adults grow up to 5–7 millimetres (0.20–0.28 in) long and can mostly be encountered in late spring usually in damp meadows. Their body is black, while elytra are reddish, with a longitudinal dark stripe. The larvae are bioluminescent and are predators of snails.
