= Cneoglossidae =

Scientific classification
- Kingdom: Animalia
- Phylum: Arthropoda
- Clade: Pancrustacea
- Class: Insecta
- Order: Coleoptera
- Suborder: Polyphaga
- Infraorder: Elateriformia
- Superfamily: Byrrhoidea
- Family: Cneoglossidae; Champion, 1897
- Genus: Cneoglossa; Guérin-Méneville, 1843

Species
- See text

Family of beetles

Cneoglossidae is a family of beetles in the superfamily Byrrhoidea, containing nine described species in a single genus, Cneoglossa, which are native to the Neotropics from Mexico to Brazil. The larvae develop inside rotting submerged branches found in small fast flowing shallow streams.

== Taxonomy ==
- Cneoglossa brevis Champion, 1897
- Cneoglossa collaris Guérin-Méneville, 1849
- Cneoglossa elongata Pic, 1916
- Cneoglossa gournellei Pic, 1916
- Cneoglossa lampyroides Champion, 1897
- Cneoglossa longipennis (Pic, 1915)
- Cneoglossa peruviana Pic, 1916
- Cneoglossa rufifrons Pic, 1916
- Cneoglossa testacericollis Pic, 1916
