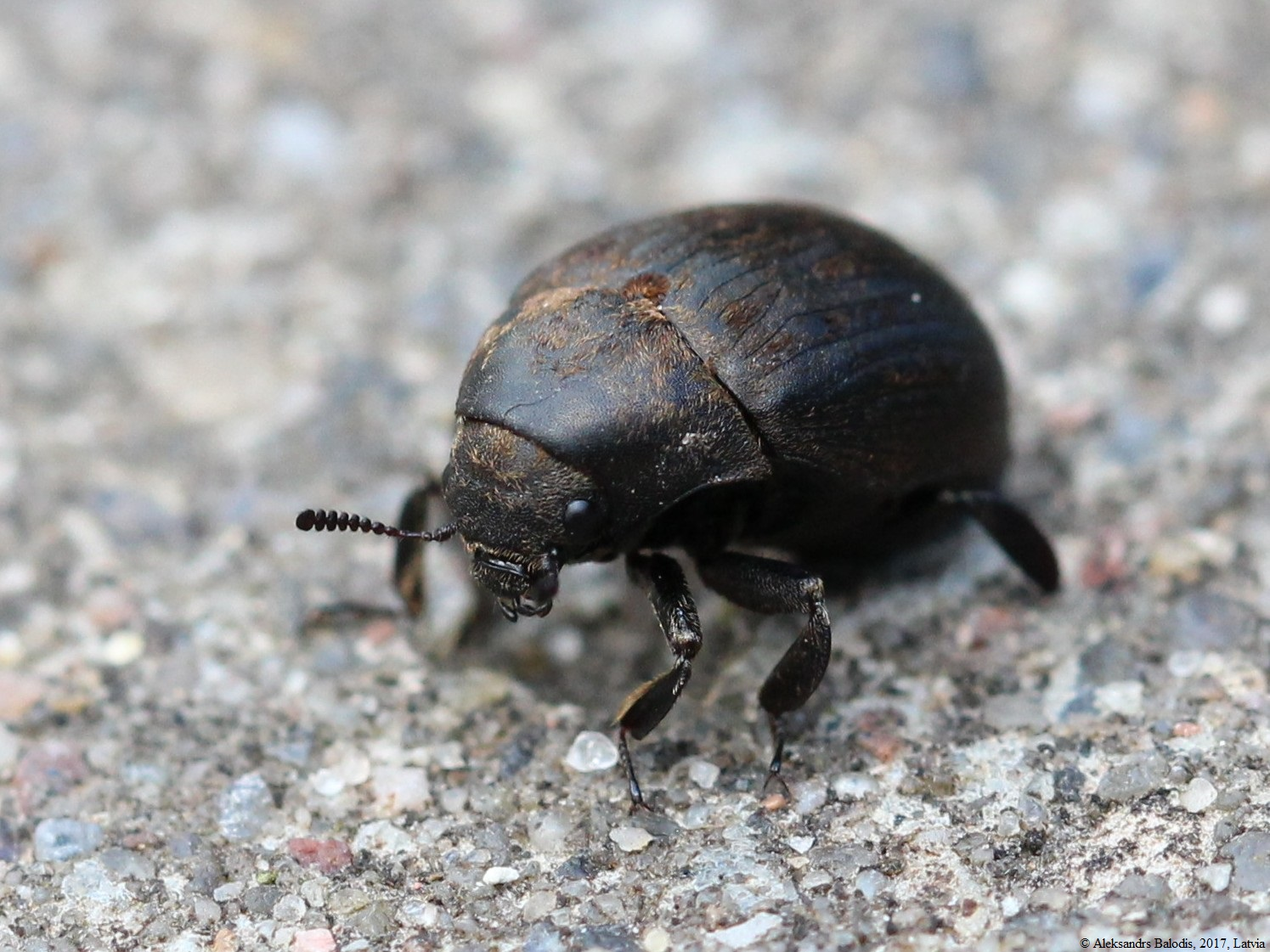
- Byrrhus pilula

Scientific classification
- Kingdom: Animalia
- Phylum: Arthropoda
- Clade: Pancrustacea
- Class: Insecta
- Order: Coleoptera
- Suborder: Polyphaga
- Infraorder: Elateriformia
- Superfamily: Byrrhoidea

Families
- Byrrhidae - pill beetles Callirhipidae - cedar beetles Chelonariidae - turtle beetles Cneoglossidae; Dryopidae - long-toed water beetles Elmidae - riffle beetles Eulichadidae - forest stream beetles Heteroceridae - variegated mud loving beetles Limnichidae - minute mud beetles Lutrochidae - travertine beetles Psephenidae - water pennies Ptilodactylidae

= Byrrhoidea =

Pill beetles and allies

Superfamily of beetles

Byrrhoidea is a superfamily of beetles belonging to Elateriformia that includes several families which are either aquatic or associated with a semi-aquatic habitat. Other than the superfamily Hydrophiloidea, most of the remaining Polyphagan beetles which are aquatic are in this superfamily.

== Description ==
Adults of many Byrrhoidea have exocone eyes (with expanded corneal lens). The anterior edge of the scutellar shield is often abruptly elevated (except in Psephenidae and Cneoglossidae). A variety of byrrhoids have the first three abdominal ventrites solidly fused together.

Larvae of most Limnichidae have one pair of anal hooks on the tenth abdominal segment, while Cneoglossidae and Ptilodactylidae have three or more hooks on each side of this segment. Larvae of Lutrochidae and Elmidae, as well as the limnichid genus Hyphalus, have anal gill tufts. Almost all byrrhoid larvae have anterior abdominal spiracles that are biforous (or bilabiate) in shape.

The degree of wing development varies among Byrrhoidea, with macroptery (wings fully developed), brachyptery (wings reduced), microptery (wings reduced to small remnants) and aptery (no wings) all occurring in the superfamily. Within family Elmidae, subfamily Larainae has only macropterous wings, while other wing types are common in subfamily Elminae. Within family Dryopidae, the genera with aquatic or semiaquatic adults are almost always macropterous, while genera with terrestrial adults are almost always apterous and the subterranean Stygoparnus is micropterous.

== Ecology ==
Byrrhoids mainly occur in aquatic and semi-aquatic habitats, including rapid cool streams, underneath rocks and wood in flowing water, waterside vegetation and rocks, emergent vegetation in water, damp soil and sandy shorelines. The Dryopidae are notable in that while their adults live in or near water, their larvae are usually terrestrial.

Byrrhoids are generally herbivorous, feeding on algae, moss, liverworts, lichens or grass roots.

== Phylogeny ==
Byrrhoidea in its current state may not be monophyletic. Multiple studies have found Buprestoidea to be nested within it. Recent phylogenies have split out the grouping Dryopoidea, including Dryopidae, Elmidae, Limnichidae, Heteroceridae, Chelonariidae, Eulichadidae, Callirhipidae, Ptilodactylidae and the extinct family Mastigocoleidae, with phylogenies finding the group more closely related to Elateroidea than to Byrhhidae.

- Elateriformia
  - Dascilloidea
  - - - Byrrhoidea sensu stricto
        Byrrhidae
      - Buprestoidea
        Buprestidae
    - - Dryopoidea
        - Dryopidae
        - - Eulichadidae
          - - Callirhipidae
            - - Ptilodactylidae
              - - - Chelonariidae
                  - Psephenidae
                - - Elmidae
                  - - Limnichidae (part)
                    - - Heteroceridae
                      - Limnichidae (part)
      - Elateroidea
