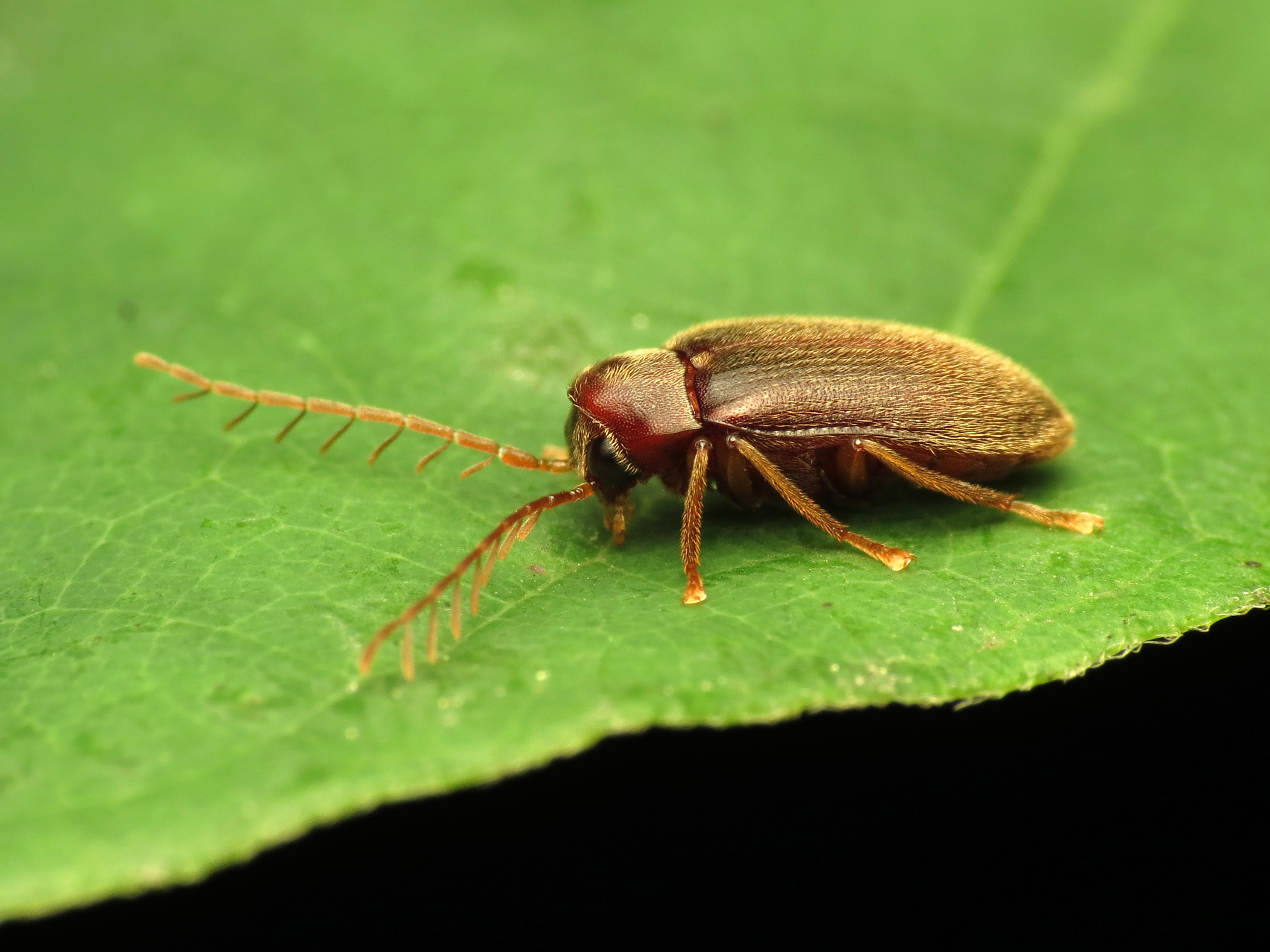

Scientific classification
- Kingdom: Animalia
- Phylum: Arthropoda
- Clade: Pancrustacea
- Class: Insecta
- Order: Coleoptera
- Suborder: Polyphaga
- Infraorder: Elateriformia
- Superfamily: Byrrhoidea
- Family: Ptilodactylidae; Laporte, 1836

Genera
- See text

= Ptilodactylidae =

Ptilodactylidae Temporal range: Cenomanian–Recent

Family of beetles

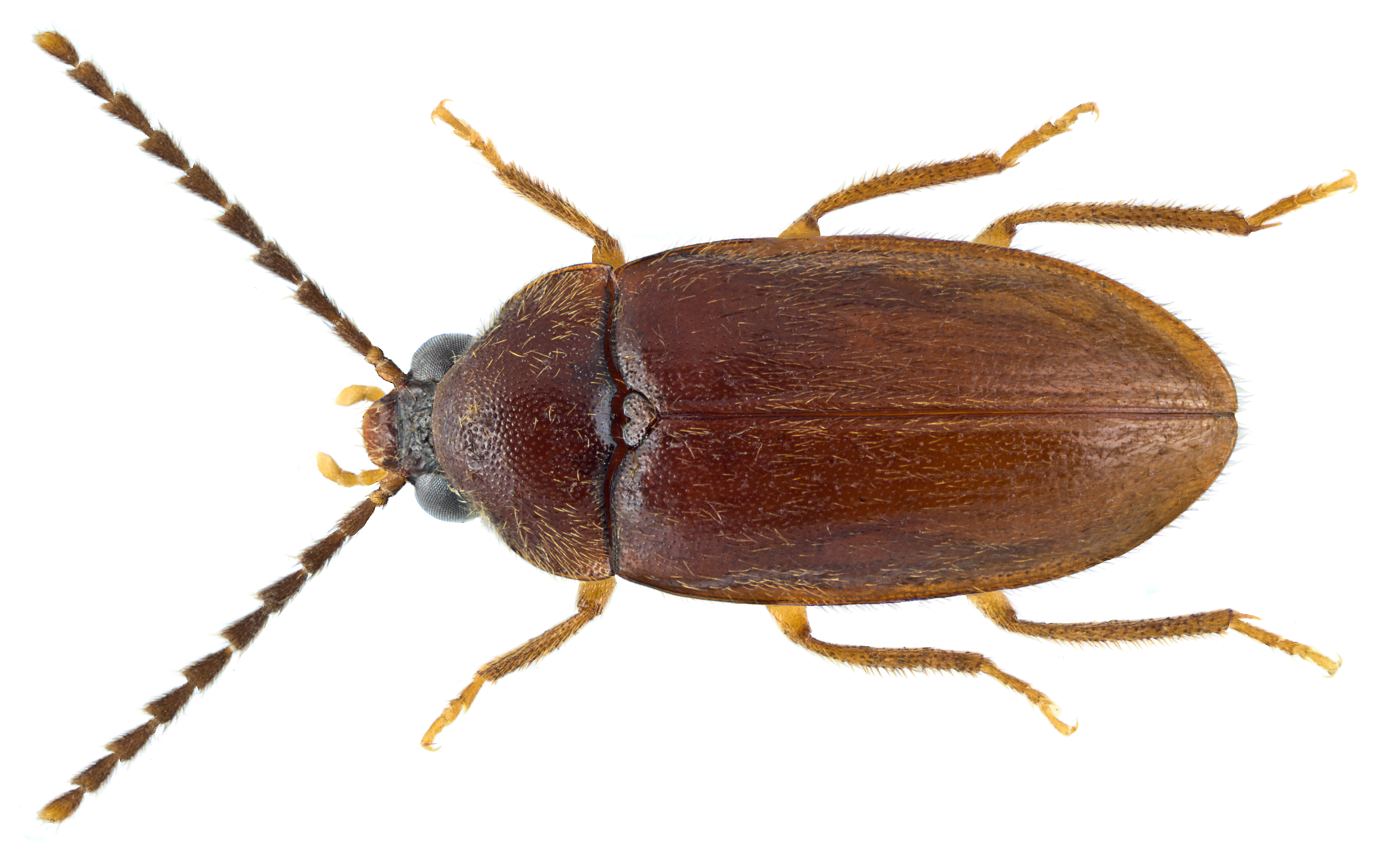
A picture of Ptilodactylidae

Ptilodactylidae is a family of beetles belonging to the Elateriformia. There around 500 extant species in 35 genera. They are generally associated with riparian and aquatic habitats. The larvae generally live associated with rotting wood or vegetation, or within gravel and detritus on the edge of water bodies. The larvae of some species feed on submerged rotting wood or on plant roots, while the adults of some species are known to feed on fungus with modified brush-like maxillae.

== Genera ==
Subfamily Anchytarsinae Champion, 1897

- Anchycteis Horn, 1880
- Anchytarsus Guérin-Méneville, 1843
- Epilichas White, 1859
- Pseudoepilichas Armstrong & Nakane, 1956
- †Electrolichas Alekseev & Jäch 2016 Baltic amber, Eocene

Subfamily Apoglossinae Champion, 1897

- Apoglossa Guérin-Méneville, 1843
- Bradytoma Guérin-Méneville, 1849
- Octoglossa Guérin-Méneville, 1843

Subfamily Araeopidiinae Lawrence, 1991

- Araeopidius Cockerell, 1906

Subfamily Byrrocryptinae Lawrence et al., 2024

- Byrrocryptus Broun, 1893

Subfamily Cladotominae Pic, 1914

- Austrolichus Lawrence & Stribling, 1992
- Cladotoma Westwood, 1837
- Drupeus Lewis, 1895
- Hovactyla Fairmaire, 1901
- Paralichus White, 1859
- Pseudocladotoma Pic, 1918

Subfamily Ptilodactylinae Laporte, 1836

- Chelonariomorphus Pic, 1916
- Daemon Laporte, 1836
- Falsotherius Pic, 1913
- Lachnodactyla Champion, 1897
- Microdrupeus Nakane, 1993
- Pherocladus Fairmaire, 1881
- Podabrocephalus Pic, 1913
- Ptilodactyla Illiger, 1807
- Stirophora Champion, 1897

Subfamily Unplaced

- Aphebodactyla Chatzimanolis, Cashion, Engel, & Falin, 2012
- Falsoptilodactyla Pic, 1958
- Ptilodactyloides Motschulsky, 1856
- Therius Guérin-Méneville, 1849
- Valoka Deleve, 1872
- †Aphebodactyla Chatzimanolis et al. 2012 Burmese amber, Myanmar, Cenomanian
- †Ptilodactyloides Motschulsky 1856 Baltic amber, Eocene
