= Neozygites remaudierei =

Scientific classification
- Kingdom: Fungi
- Division: Entomophthoromycota
- Class: Entomophthoromycetes
- Order: Entomophthorales
- Family: Neozygitaceae
- Genus: Neozygites
- Species: N. remaudierei

Binomial name
- Neozygites remaudierei Keller

Species of fungus

Neozygites remaudierei is a microscopic fungus in the order Entomophthorales, which affects aphids, particularly Myzocallis coryli.
