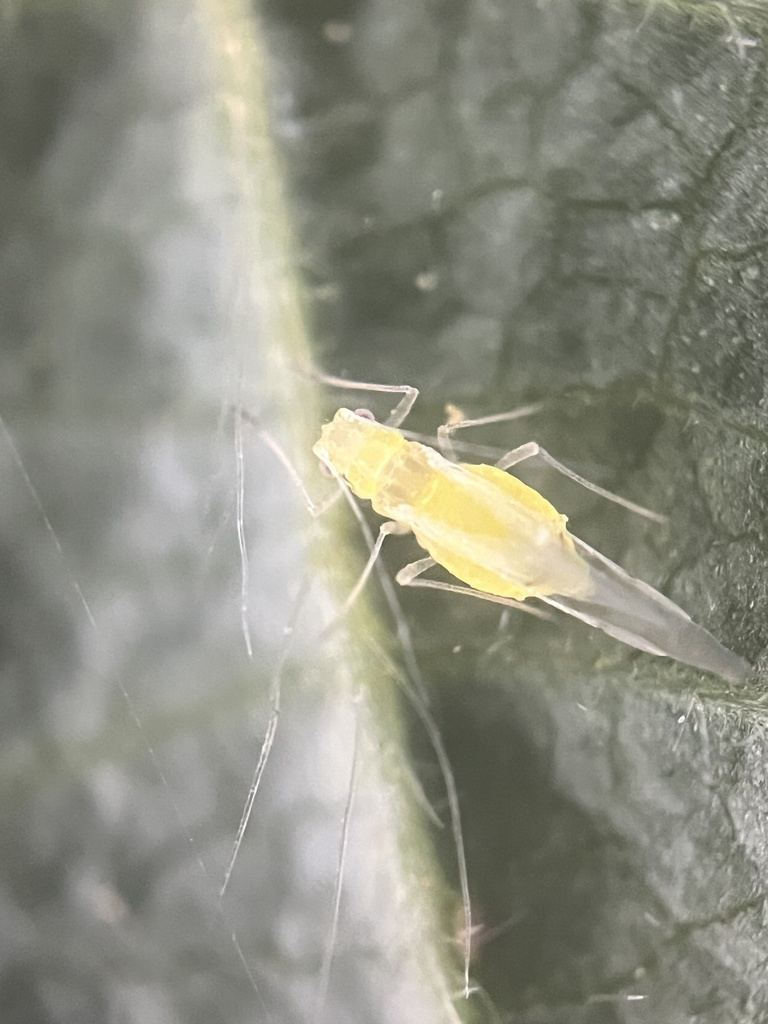

Scientific classification
- Kingdom: Animalia
- Phylum: Arthropoda
- Class: Insecta
- Order: Hemiptera
- Suborder: Sternorrhyncha
- Family: Aphididae
- Genus: Myzocallis
- Species: M. coryli

Binomial name
- Myzocallis coryli Goeze, 1778

= Myzocallis coryli =

Species of aphid

Myzocallis coryli, commonly known as the hazel aphid, is an aphid in the genus Myzocallis found in the United States and Europe.

This species has recently been seen in Tasmania, as a recent introduction, with the first record being in 2019.

== Description ==
This species is whiteish green when young, turning light yellow green when mature. this species has almost nonexistent siphunculi, which under a microscope are cone shaped. These aphids also have sparse hairs covering their bodies.

Some adults are lighter in coloration and have a set of subtle black lines on their wings.

== Photography ==
Good close up images are a must for photography and identification of this species in Europe, though the aphid's host plant and its light coloration is an easy way to distinguish in the United States from other aphid species.

== Host plants ==
This species only uses Corylus genus plants as their host. In the woods, they use beaked hazelnuts. In agricultural settings they can, and will, use Corylus avellana and related species as their host plants. Ornamental trees are also used.

== Agricultural damage ==
In Oregon, these aphids are major pests to hazelnut farming. Heavy infestations will cause hazelnuts to become stunted or smaller, which makes them less suitable for commercial sale and unappealing.

== Natural Predators ==
This species is preyed upon by Adalia bipunctata, Deraeocoris brevis,Heterotoma meriopterum, and Compsidolon salicellum. Said species was at one point being considered for introduction into Oregon due to the impact on Hazel plants caused by these aphids agriculturally.

== Gallery ==
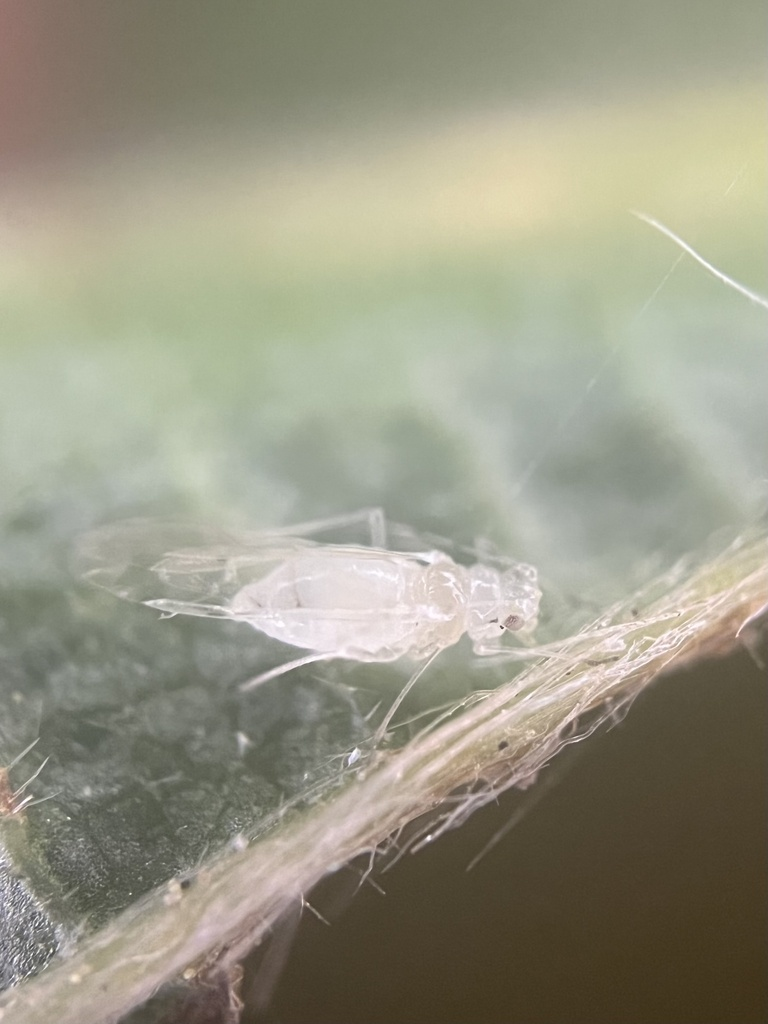
An example of a Hazel Aphid with light coloration taken at Lakeridge Park, in King County, Wa, on a Beaked Hazlenut.

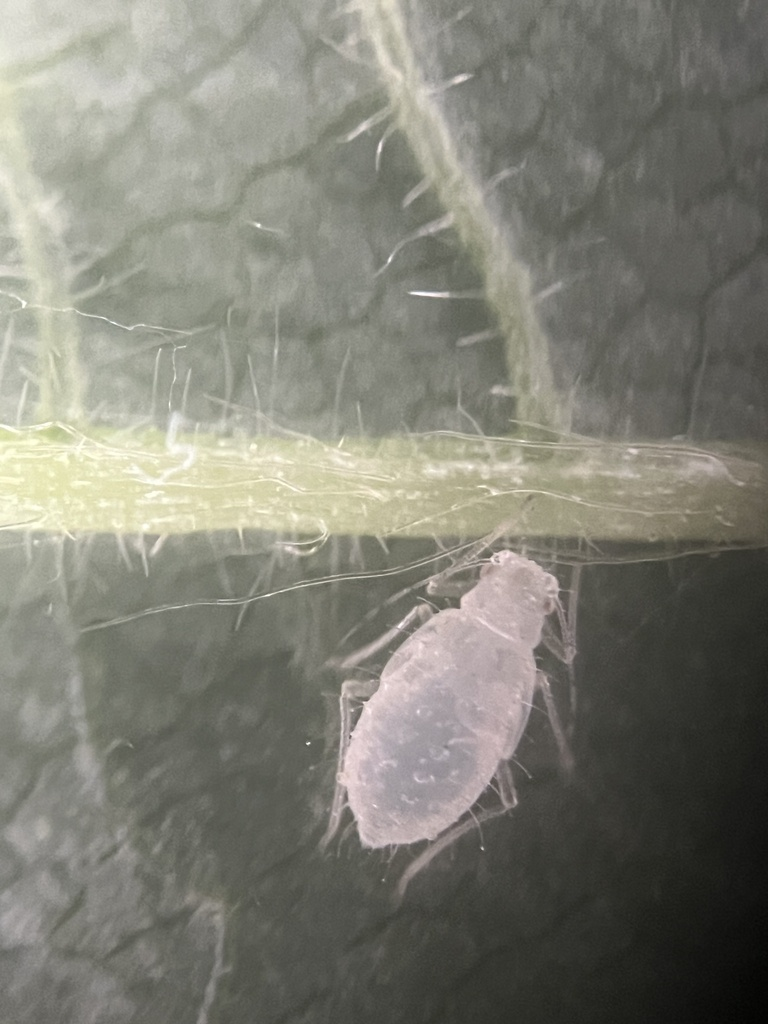
A nearly winged juvenile hazel aphid found in Seward Park, a city park in Washington, on a Beaked Hazelnut.

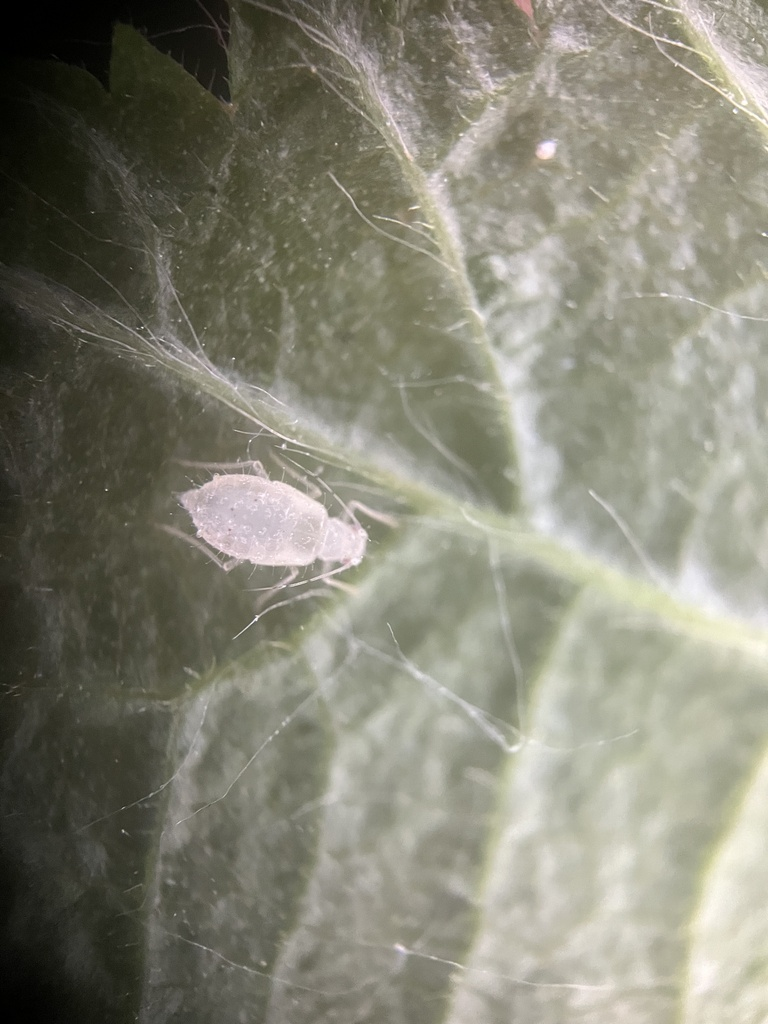
a young juvenile hazel aphid found at the entrance of the May Creek Trail, a local hiking trail in Newcastle, WA, on a Beaked Hazelnut.

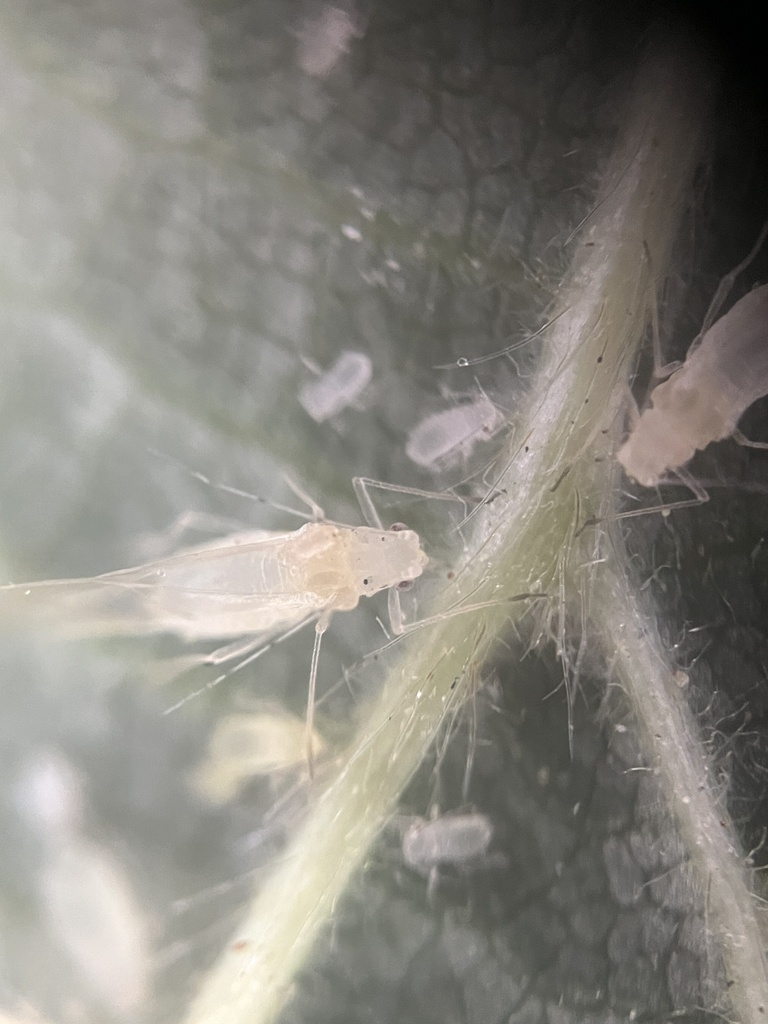
A yellow shouldered adult Hazel aphid with small babies beneath it, taken on a Common Hazel bush found on, S 114th St, Seattle, WA.
