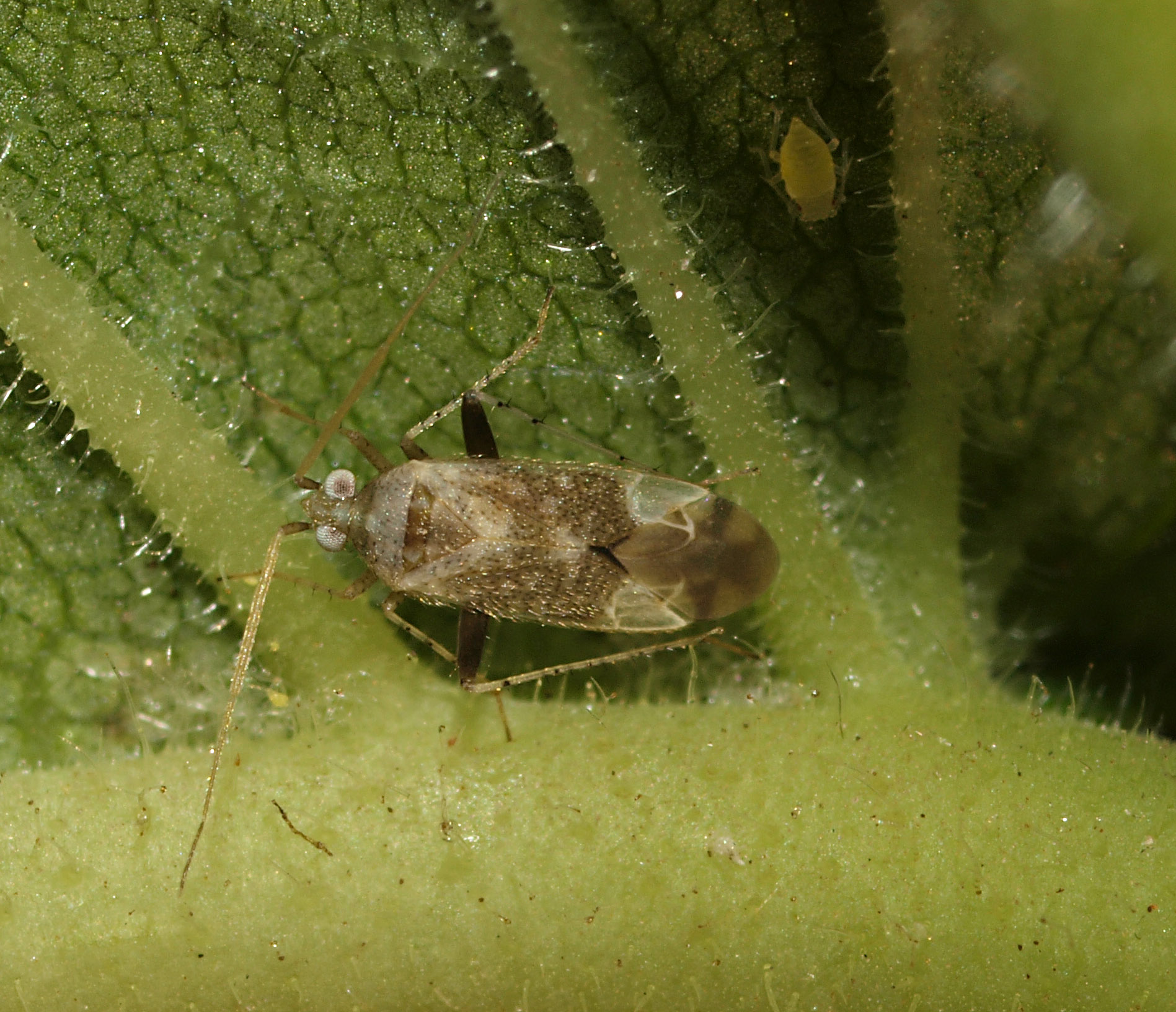
- Compsidolon salicellum

Scientific classification
- Kingdom: Animalia
- Phylum: Arthropoda
- Clade: Pancrustacea
- Class: Insecta
- Order: Hemiptera
- Suborder: Heteroptera
- Family: Miridae
- Subfamily: Phylinae
- Tribe: Phylini
- Genus: Compsidolon; Reuter, 1899

= Compsidolon =

Genus of true bugs

Compsidolon is a genus of plant bugs in the family Miridae. There are more than 60 described species in Compsidolon.

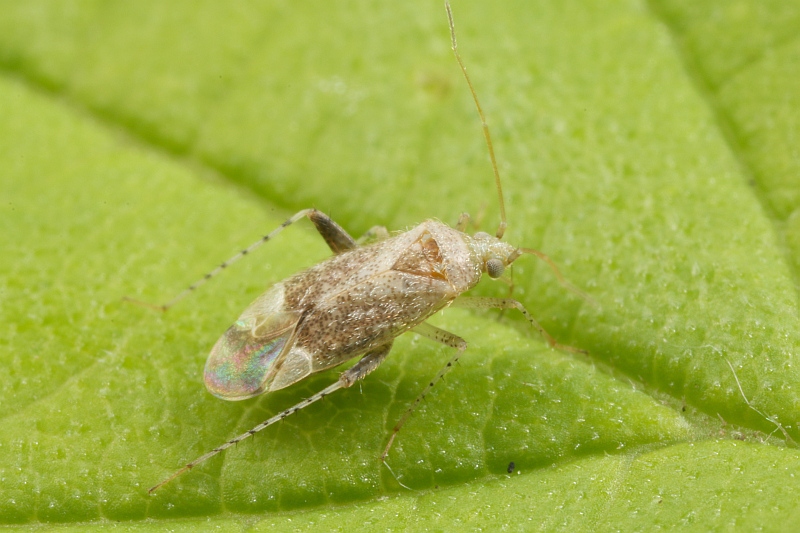
Compsidolon salicellum

== Species ==
These 64 species belong to the genus Compsidolon:

- Compsidolon absinthii (J.Scott, 1870)
- Compsidolon acuticeps (Wagner, 1961)
- Compsidolon ailaoshanensis
- Compsidolon alatavicum (Kerzhner, 1962)
- Compsidolon alcmene Linnavuori, 1971
- Compsidolon alibeganum Linnavuori, 1984
- Compsidolon anagae Gyllensvard, 1968
- Compsidolon balachowskyi (Wagner, 1958)
- Compsidolon beckeri (Reuter, 1904)
- Compsidolon bicolor (Reuter, 1883)
- Compsidolon bipunctatum Wagner, 1975
- Compsidolon collare Wagner, 1976
- Compsidolon crotchi (J.Scott, 1870)
- Compsidolon cyticellum (Lindberg, 1953)
- Compsidolon cytisellum (Lindberg, 1953)
- Compsidolon cytisi (Lindberg, 1953)
- Compsidolon eckerleini Wagner, 1970
- Compsidolon elaegnicola Yasunaga, 1999
- Compsidolon elegantulum Reuter, 1899
- Compsidolon eximium (Reuter, 1879)
- Compsidolon flavidum
- Compsidolon freyi (Wagner, 1954)
- Compsidolon furcillatum Li, Liu, Hu & Zheng, 2007
- Compsidolon galbanus Gyllensvard, 1968
- Compsidolon hiemale Konstantinov 2006
- Compsidolon hierroense (Wagner, 1954)
- Compsidolon hierroensis (Wagner, 1954)
- Compsidolon hippophaes Muminov 1979
- Compsidolon hoggaricum Wagner, 1974
- Compsidolon ishmedagan Linnavuori, 1984
- Compsidolon isis Linnavuori, 1993
- Compsidolon kerzhneri Kulik, 1973
- Compsidolon littorale Wagner, 1965
- Compsidolon longiceps (Reuter, 1904)
- Compsidolon maculicorne Linnavuori, 1986
- Compsidolon minutum Wagner, 1970
- Compsidolon nanno Linnavuori, 1971
- Compsidolon narzykulovi Muminov 1964
- Compsidolon nathaliae (Josifov, 1974)
- Compsidolon nebulosum (Reuter, 1878)
- Compsidolon pallidicorne (Poppius, 1914)
- Compsidolon parietariae V.Putshkov, 1984
- Compsidolon parviceps (Wagner, 1954)
- Compsidolon pilosum
- Compsidolon pseudocrotchi Wagner, 1965
- Compsidolon pterocephali (Lindberg, 1948)
- Compsidolon pumilum (Jakovlev, 1876)
- Compsidolon punctulatum Qi & Nonnaizab, 1995
- Compsidolon qoshanum Linnavuori, 1984
- Compsidolon reraiense (Lindberg, 1940)
- Compsidolon robustum Linnavuori, 1986
- Compsidolon russatum (Odhiambo, 1960)
- Compsidolon sabulicola Linnavuori, 1984
- Compsidolon salicellum (Herrich-schaeffer, 1841)
- Compsidolon salviae (Linnavuori, 1961)
- Compsidolon saundersi (Reuter, 1901)
- Compsidolon saxosum V.Putshkov, 1975
- Compsidolon schrenkianum
- Compsidolon scutellare (Reuter, 1902)
- Compsidolon shrenkianum Konstantinov & Vinokurov, 2011
- Compsidolon surdum Linnavuori, 1975
- Compsidolon torridum Linnavuori, 1975
- Compsidolon uncum Li, Liu, Hu & Zheng, 2007
- Compsidolon verbenae (Wagner, 1954)
