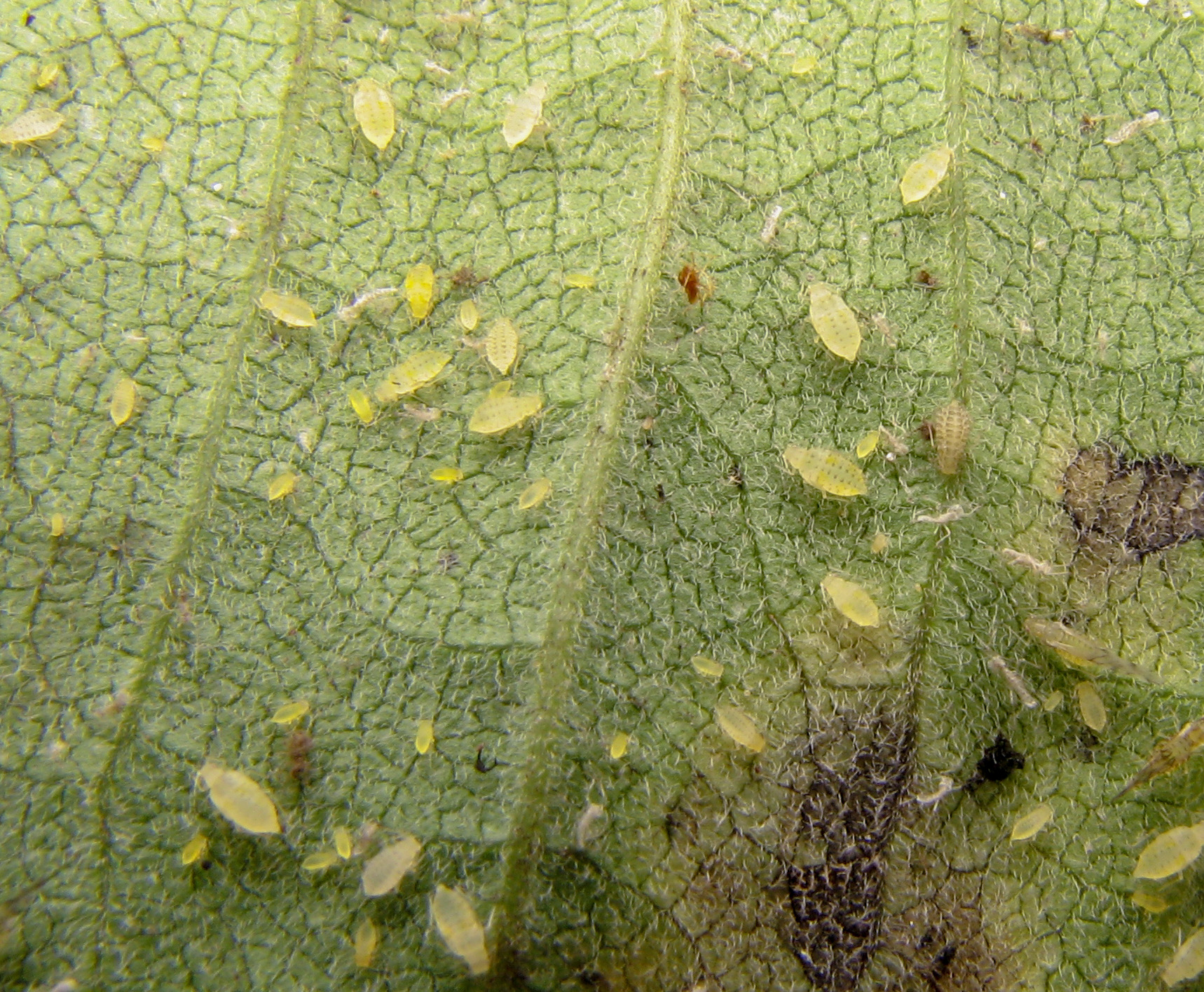
- Myzocallis asclepiadis on Asclepias

Scientific classification
- Kingdom: Animalia
- Phylum: Arthropoda
- Class: Insecta
- Order: Hemiptera
- Suborder: Sternorrhyncha
- Family: Aphididae
- Genus: Myzocallis; Passerini, 1860

= Myzocallis =

Genus of true bugs

Myzocallis is a genus of true bugs belonging to the family Aphididae.

Some species feed on oaks, others on Apocynaceae.

Some species

There are more than 40 species

Myzocallis coryli

Myzocallis asclepiadis

Myzocallis castanicola

Myzocallis myricae

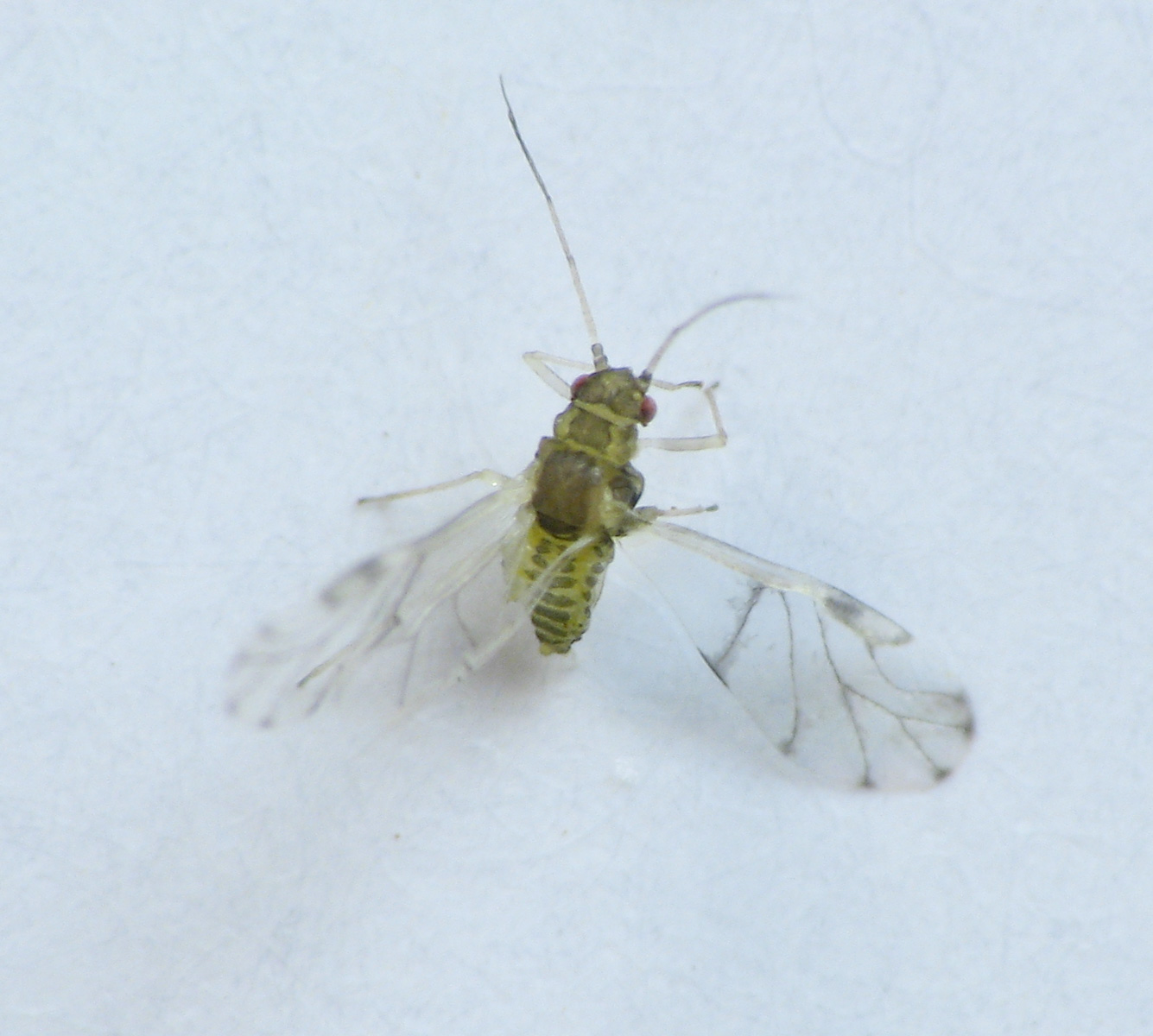
Myzocallis asclepiadis, alate
