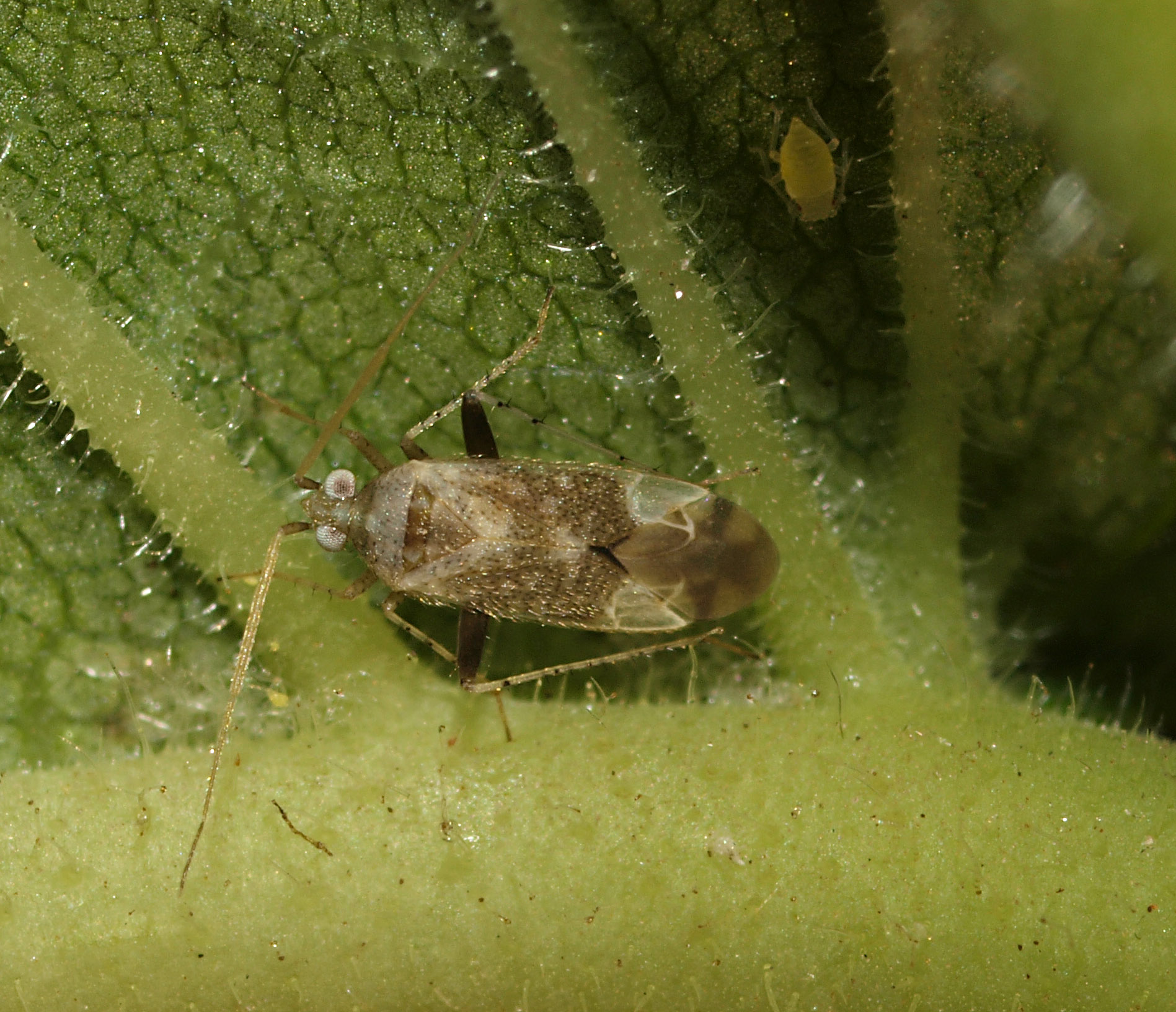

Scientific classification
- Kingdom: Animalia
- Phylum: Arthropoda
- Class: Insecta
- Order: Hemiptera
- Suborder: Heteroptera
- Family: Miridae
- Genus: Compsidolon
- Species: C. salicellum

Binomial name
- Compsidolon salicellum (Herrich-Schaeffer, 1841)

= Compsidolon salicellum =

Species of true bug

Compsidolon salicellum is a species of plant bug in the family Miridae. It is found in Europe across the Palearctic to Siberia and Korea. It is also found in North America as an Adventive species.

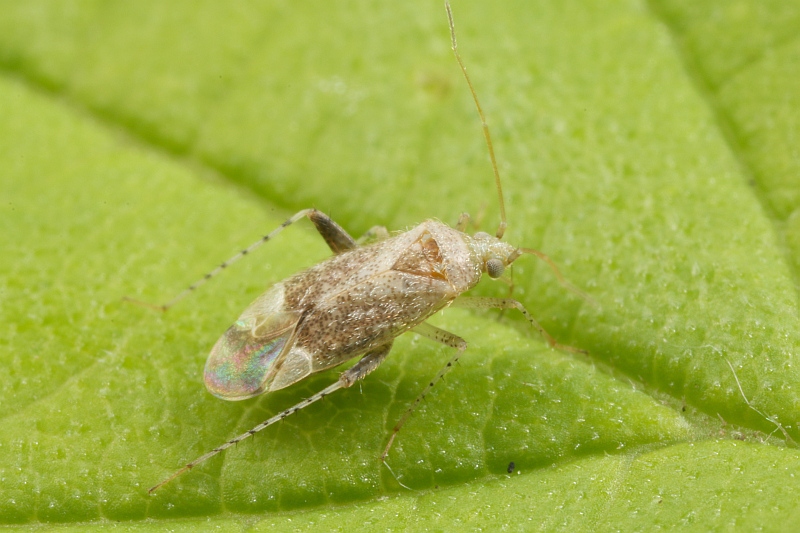

== Biology ==
Sunny, dry as well as humid habitats are inhabited, such as forest edges or isolated bushes.

The bugs live mainly on common hazel (Corylus avellana), more rarely on other deciduous shrubs such as willow (Salix), alder (Alnus), honeysuckle (Lonicera), oak (Quercus ) or linden (Tilia ), occasionally Rubus species. They are zoophytophagous and suck both plant sap, as well as on mites, for example . The adult bugs can be observed from mid / late July to late September. The species has one generation per year.
