= Brent Saunders =

American biopharma executive and entrepreneur

- Education: Bachelor's, University of Pittsburgh; MBA, Temple University; JD, Temple University
- Occupations: Chairman and CEO of Bausch + Lomb; Founder of Vesper Healthcare Acquisition; Chairman of The Beauty Health Company; Chairman of Hugel America
- Known for: Biopharma executive, entrepreneur

Brent Saunders (born 1970) is an American biopharma executive and entrepreneur who is the chairman and CEO of the health company Bausch & Lomb. He helped lead various mergers and acquisitions, including the mergers between Merck and Schering-Plough, the acquisition of Bausch + Lomb by Valeant Pharmaceuticals, and the $63 billion acquisition of Allergan by Abbvie. He founded the special-purpose acquisition company (SPAC) Vesper Healthcare Acquisition. Saunders is also executive chairman of medical aesthetics companies The Beauty Health Company and Hugel America.

== Early life and education ==
Saunders was born in 1970 to Charles and Sheila Saunders, a urologist and social worker. He grew up in the Lehigh Valley region of eastern Pennsylvania, with a twin brother, Wayne, and sister Reed, and graduated from Parkland High School in South Whitehall Township, Pennsylvania in 1988.

He attended the University of Pittsburgh, where he was president of the student government board, and graduated in 1992 with a bachelor's degree in economics and East Asian studies. In 1996, he received MBA and J.D. degrees from Temple University in Philadelphia.

== Career ==
In 1996, while attending law school, Saunders started working part-time at Jefferson Health as a compliance officer.

In 2000, Saunders joined PricewaterhouseCoopers as a healthcare compliance manager, and became partner and head of the firm's compliance business advisory services group. In October 2003, Saunders was hired as senior vice president of global compliance and business practices at Schering-Plough, a pharmaceutical company. In mid-2007, he became president of consumer health care at Schering-Plough, with responsibility for a business unit of products including Coppertone, Dr. Scholl's, and Claritin. In 2009, Saunders led the integration team of Schering-Plough's merger with Merck.

In 2010, Saunders was appointed chief executive officer of Bausch & Lomb, an eye health company. That year, he was also appointed to the Federal Reserve advisory board. In 2013, as CEO of Bausch + Lomb, he oversaw its acquisition by Valeant Pharmaceuticals, now known as Bausch Health, for $8.7 billion. He joined Valeant in an advisory role to assist with the transition. In October, Saunders joined pharmaceutical company Forest Laboratories as CEO. Ten months later, Saunders was named chief executive officer of Actavis, a pharmaceutical company, after the company acquired Forest Laboratories. In November 2014, Saunders negotiated Actavis' merger with Allergan, a pharmaceutical company, for a reported $70.5 billion. The new combined company took the Allergan name.

Saunders appeared on the February 2015 cover of Forbes magazine, where he was named "Wall Street's Drug Dealer". In May 2019, Saunders survived a proposal brought by hedge fund Appaloosa Management to split Allergan's chairman and CEO roles. In June, pharmaceutical company Abbvie acquired Allergan for $63 billion.

In June 2020, Saunders joined the board of BridgeBio Pharma, a company founded in 2019. In September, Saunders’ special-purpose acquisition company Vesper Healthcare Acquisition publicly launched, and raised $400 million. Filings indicated that Saunders owned 20% of the company after the SPAC sale. By December, Saunders made his first deal with Vesper, acquiring HydraFacial, a beauty treatment company, for $1.1 billion. Vesper's HydraFacial deal closed in May 2021, and the new company was renamed The Beauty Health Company, with Saunders taking the role of executive chairman. He also served as interim CEO until February 2022.

In June 2022, Saunders was named to the board of medical aesthetics company Hugel America, an affiliate of South Korea-based Hugel Inc.

In March 2023, Saunders returned to Bausch + Lomb as CEO and chairman. In June, Saunders signed his first deal as CEO, purchasing dry eye drug Xiidra from Novartis for $1.75 billion.
