= Sea & Ski =

Sunscreen invented by Charles Rolley

- Product type: Sunscreen
- Current owner: Botany Industries
- Country: United States
- Introduced: 1955
- Related brands: Sold by its inventor Charles Rolley to Botany Industries
- Markets: United States
- Website: seaski.com

Sea & Ski, a sunscreen with a unique scent, was invented by Charles Rolley, who lived in Reno, Nevada. TIME called him a "kinetic promoter". Rolley sold it to Botany Industries in 1955. It was sold in the late 1960s to Smith-Kline Pharmaceuticals. The brand was owned by Carter-Wallace (Carter’s Liver Pills) until 1988, when it was purchased by Fabergé. Robert Bell, executive and founder, sold off the Banana Boat tanning oil company, to Edgewell Personal Care for $30 million in 1990 and bought Sea & Ski Corp. Faulding Consumer, of Mayne Nickless Ltd, an Australian pharmaceutical company, purchased Sea & Ski in 2000 to go along with their other brand, Banana Boat. In 2003, the brand was sold to Pathfinder Management Inc.

== See also ==
- Bain de Soleil
- Coppertone (sunscreen)
- Piz Buin (brand)
