= Piz Buin (brand) =

Swiss sunscreen brand

- Product type: Sunscreen
- Country: Switzerland
- Introduced: 1946
- Markets: Europe
- Website: thepizbuin.com

Piz Buin is the trading name of a sunscreen firm, whose headquarters is in Zug, Switzerland. It is named after Piz Buin, a 3312-metre-high mountain in the Eastern Alps.

The Piz Buin brand traces its origin back to the inspiration of Franz Greiter, a young chemistry student, who suffered severe sunburn while climbing Piz Buin in 1938.

In 1946, Swiss chemist Franz Greiter introduced what may have been the first effective modern sunscreen. The product, called Gletscher Crème (Glacier Cream), subsequently became the basis for the company Piz Buin, which is still today a marketer of sunscreen products, named in honor of the mountain where Greiter allegedly obtained the sunburn that inspired his sunscreen.

In 1974, Greiter adapted earlier calculations from Friedrich Ellinger and Rudolf Schulze and introduced the "sun protection factor" (SPF), which has become a worldwide standard for measuring the effectiveness of sunscreen. It has been estimated that Gletscher Crème had an SPF of 2.

== See also ==
- Bain de Soleil
- Coppertone (sunscreen)
- Sea & Ski
