= Zinka =

Zinka can refer to:

- Zinka (given name), feminine given name
- Zinka (sunscreen), brand of zinc oxide sunscreen
