= Umu Chromotest =

Biological assay to assess the genotoxic potential of chemical compounds

For pharmacology and genetics, the Umu Chromotest, first developed and published by Oda et al., is a biological assay (bioassay) to assess the genotoxic potential of chemical compounds. It is based on the ability of DNA-damaging agents to induce the expression of the umu operon. In connection with the damage inducible (din) genes recA, lexA and umuD, the umuC gene is essentially involved in bacterial mutagenesis through the SOS response.

This test uses an operon fusion placing the lac operon (responsible for producing β-galactosidase, a protein which degrades lactose) under the control of the umu-related proteins. A simple colorimetric test is possible by adding a lactose analog which is degraded by β-galactosidase, producing a colored compound which can be measured quantitatively through spectrophotometry. The degree of color development is an indirect measure of the β-galactosidase produced, which itself is directly related to the amount of DNA damage.

The Umu Chromotest has the added advantage of having its procedure codified under ISO 13829 "Water Quality- Determination of genotoxicity of water and waste water using the umu-test". Although genotoxicity cannot be linked directly to the development of cancer in humans, a strong correlation between genotoxic effects in bacteria and their mutagenic and tumor-initiating properties in mammals has been shown to exist.

== Theory ==
Salmonella typhimurium TA 1535 [pSK 1002] bacteria are exposed to potentially genotoxic test compounds in a 96-well microplate. If genotoxic lesions are produced in the bacterial genome, the umuC gene is induced as part of the general SOS response. The plasmid pSK1002 contains the umuC gene fused to the lacZ reporter gene, much like the fusion in the SOS Chromotest. The induction of the umuC-gene is thus a measure for the genotoxic potential of the sample. Since the umuC-gene is fused with the lacZ-gene for β-galactosidase, the induction of the umuC-gene can be easily assessed by determination of the β-galactosidase activity, measured by the conversion of a colorless ONPG substrate (o-nitrophenyl-β-D-galactopyranoside) to the yellow product o-nitrophenyl by the lacZ-encoded B-galactosidase.

As the SOS response is a general response to genotoxic lesions, one strain of S. typhimurium with the appropriate reporter gene construct is sufficient to identify all classes of bacterial genotoxins. As with other bacterial genotoxicity and mutagenicity assays, compounds requiring metabolic activation for activity can be investigated with the addition of S9 microsomal rat liver extract.

== Procedure ==
S. typhimurium bacteria in the exponential phase of growth are exposed for 2 hours to decreasing concentrations of test sample in triplicate, including positive and negative controls, as well as blanks. After 2 hours, the exposure cultures are diluted into fresh growth media and allowed to grow for a further 2 hours. The induction of the umuC gene and fused lacZ reporter gene and subsequent expression of β-galactosidase is assessed after lysis of the bacteria. Colorless ONPG is converted to the yellow product o-nitrophenyl in the presence of the induced β-galactosidase. The intensity of the colour correlates with the amount of the induced protein and thus genotoxic potency of the test sample.

Quantitative metrics are used, with the absorbance of the plate being read at OD600 before and after the growth phase, as well as the OD420 after ONPG incubation. This allows for the calculation of the Induction Ratio (IR), as well as the growth factor in order to determine whether cytotoxicity is also present and invalidating IR values.

== Advantages ==
The high correlation between the Umu Chromotest and traditional Ames test for mutagenicity supports it as a reasonable alternative for early-stage testing of the thousands of new pharmaceutical, agricultural and industrial chemicals synthesized every year. Most large chemical manufacturers have the ability to screen 100 or more synthetic chemicals per year with the traditional Ames test, which requires the use of several Salmonella strains. The umu test, using only a single Salmonella strain, could potentially test a greater range of new chemicals with the same resources. The reduction in material expense and labor, as well as its robustness also position it as a suitable screen for complex environmental samples.
