= Coppertone sign =

Landmark in Miami Beach, Florida

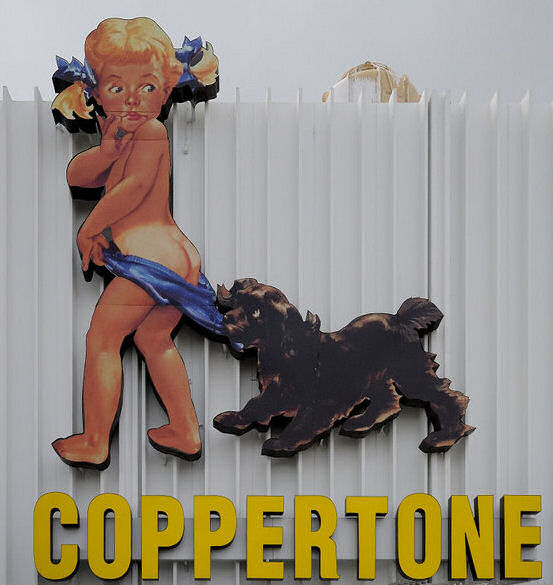
Restored sign at new location at 7300 Biscayne Blvd. in Miami

The Coppertone girl sign is a landmark in Miami Beach, Florida, known for being the last operating example of a series of mechanical billboards that were constructed by the Coppertone company to advertise its tanning oil products across the United States. The sign features a young girl and a Cocker Spaniel puppy who is attempting to steal her swimsuit bottom; the motorized dog and swimsuit bottom rock up and down, exposing the child's tan line.

== History ==
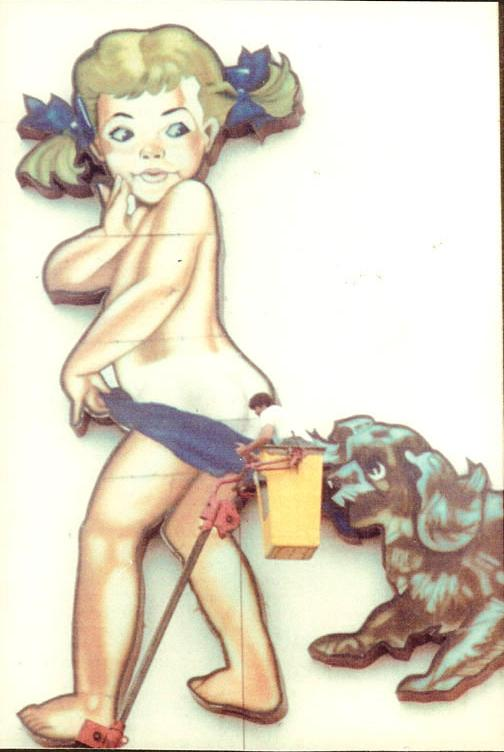
Original Coppertone sign (1958) getting routine maintenance at original location on Parkleigh House, 1980

The original plastic, metal and neon sign was designed and constructed in 1958 by Tropicalites, a sign company owned by Morris "Moe" Bengis. Before producing the sign, Bengis met with Coppertone inventor Benjamin Green and Abe Plough, the founder of Schering-Plough, which bought Coppertone in 1957. Jerry Bengis, Moe's son, stated in a blog post in 2008 that "[t]he Coppertone account became huge and we must have had 500 signs all over the east coast [sic] but none more prominent than the 'original' on the Parkleigh House".

The sign was originally installed on the Parkleigh House at 5th Street and Biscayne Boulevard in 1959. That building was demolished in 1992, but the sign was rescued by Dade Heritage Trust and moved to the Concord Building. It was eventually donated to the MiMo Biscayne Association, but by this time it was in severe disrepair, with girl's face and most of her torso missing or faded by decades in the weather.

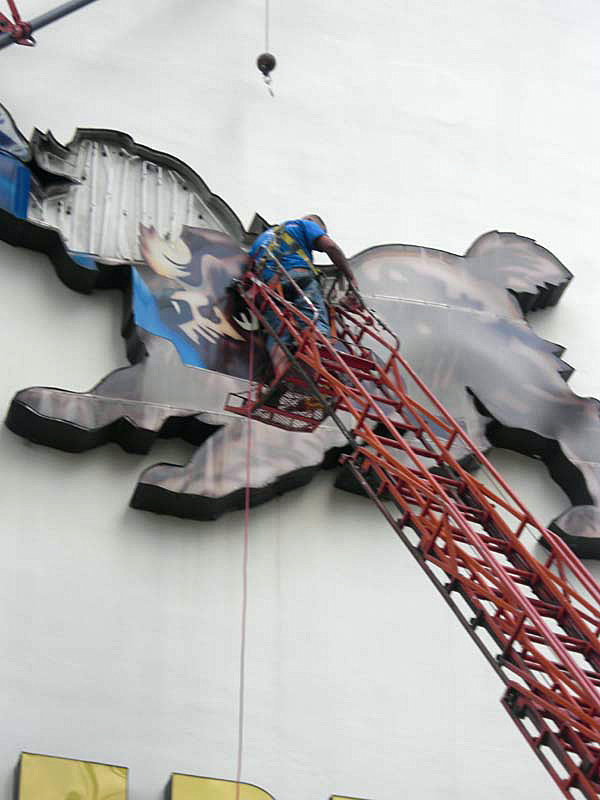
Coppertone sign being removed from the Concord Building, 17 May 2008

The sign was moved again in December 2008 to its current location at 7300 Biscayne Boulevard, close to its original location and only a few blocks from the site of the Tropicalites shop where it was originally constructed 50 years earlier. Schering-Plough donated approximately $100,000 for the sign's restoration and installation and Tropical Signs of Miami handled the reconstruction.

As of late 2011, MiMo Biscayne Association stated they could not afford to continue paying for the sign's insurance and maintenance. Merck, the parent company of Coppertone, agreed to pay US$1800 yearly for insurance and upkeep for the next five years.

== Artwork ==
After Schering-Plough bought Coppertone in 1957, the original designs for the Coppertone Girl were lost in a fire. In 1959, Joyce Ballantyne Brand recreated the now iconic Coppertone Girl artwork with very minor changes using her daughter Cheri as the model.
