= Spectronic 20 =

Single beam spectrophotometer

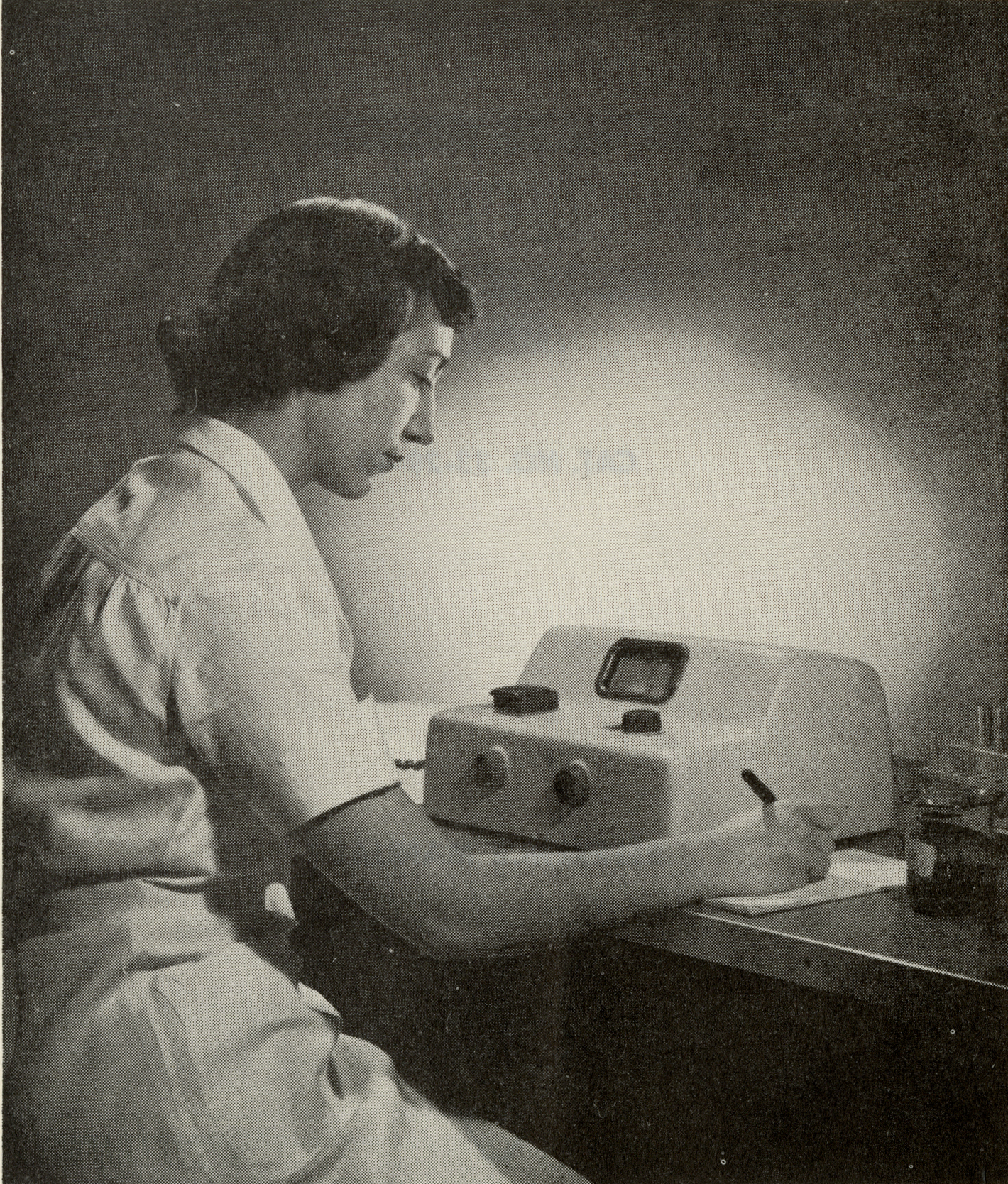
Using the Bausch & Lomb Spectronic 20 Colorimeter, 1962

The Spectronic 20 is a brand of single-beam spectrophotometer, designed to operate in the visible spectrum across a wavelength range of 340 nm to 950 nm, with a spectral bandpass of 20 nm. It is designed for quantitative absorption measurement at single wavelengths. Because it measures the transmittance or absorption of visible light through a solution, it is sometimes referred to as a colorimeter. The name of the instrument is a trademark of the manufacturer.

Developed by Bausch & Lomb and launched in 1953, the Spectronic 20 was the first low-cost spectrophotometer. It rapidly became an industry standard due to its low cost, durability and ease of use, and has been referred to as an "iconic lab spectrophotometer". Approximately 600,000 units were sold over its nearly 60 year production run. It has been the most widely used spectrophotometer worldwide. Production was discontinued in 2011 when it was replaced by the Spectronic 200, but the Spectronic 20 is still in common use. It is sometimes referred to as the "Spec 20".

== Design ==
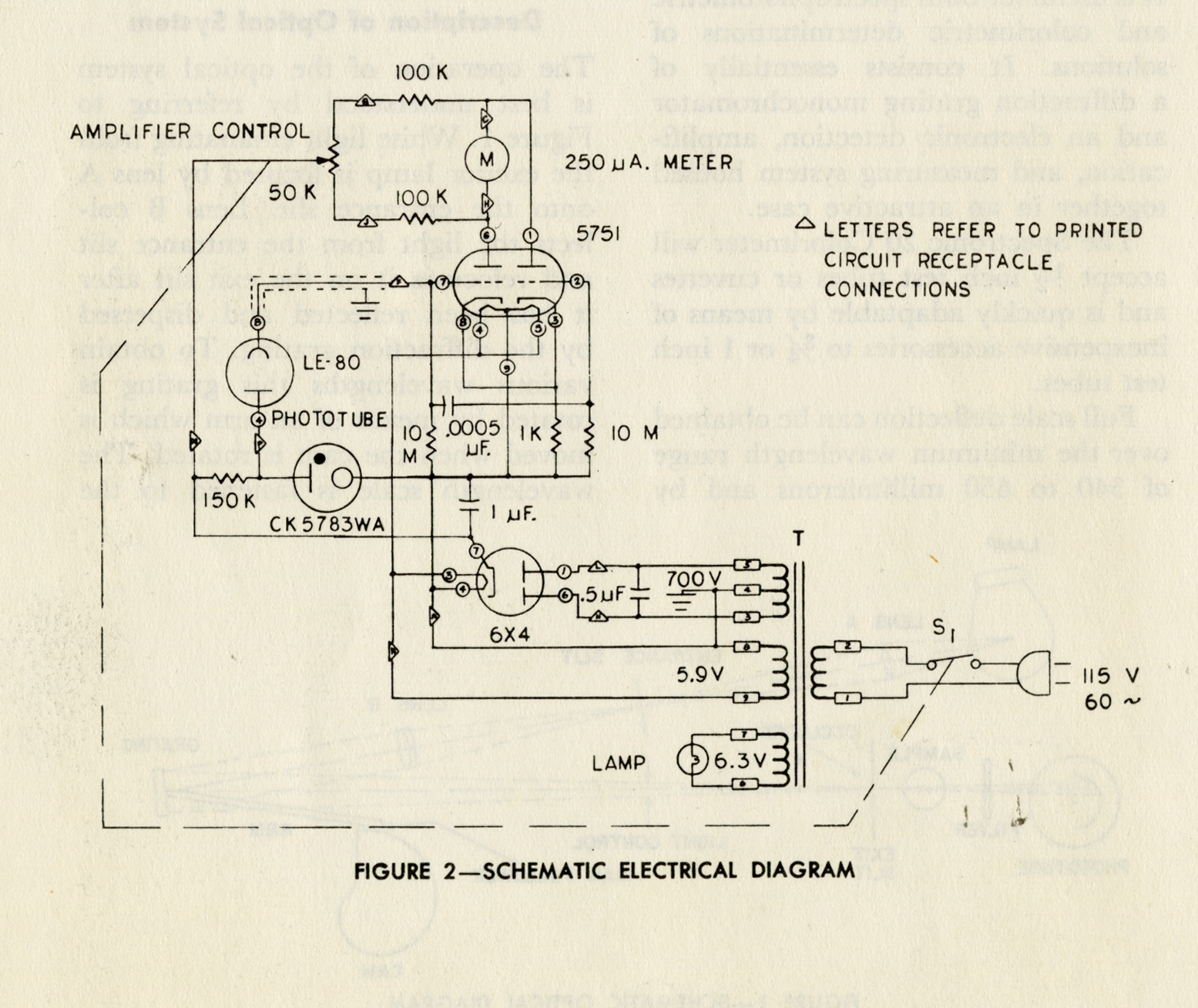
Schematic electrical diagram of the Bausch & Lomb Spectronic 20 Colorimeter

The Bausch & Lomb Spectronic 20 colorimeter uses a diffraction grating monochromator combined with a system for the detection, amplification, and measurement of light wavelengths in the 340 nm to 950 nm range.

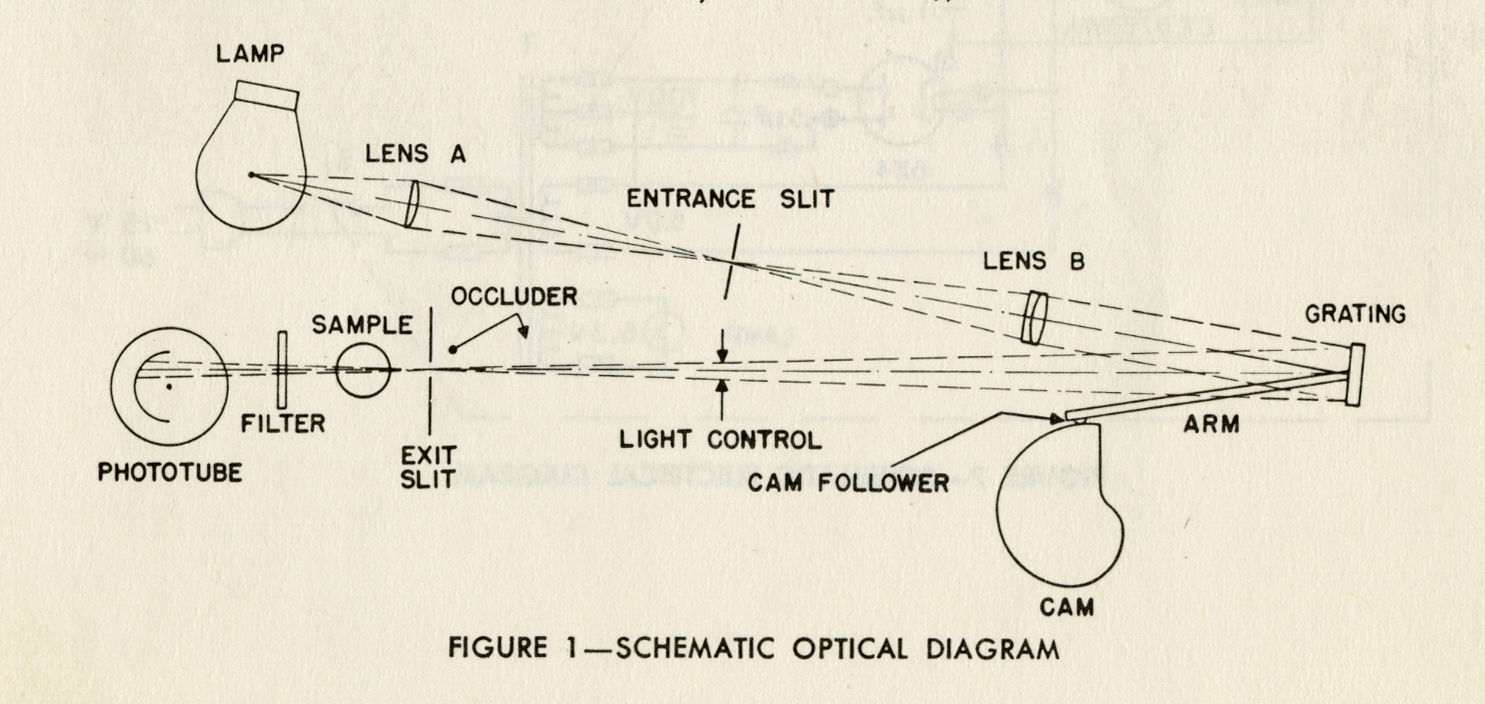
Schematic optical diagram of the Bausch & Lomb Spectronic 20 Colorimeter

As shown in the schematic optical diagram (see left), polychromatic light from a source in the system passes through lenses which are reflected and dispersed by the diffraction grating to restrict the range of light wavelengths. This restricted range of wavelengths is then passed through the sample to be measured. The intensity of the transmitted light is determined by a phototube detector. Mechanical movement of the diffraction grating by means of the cam attached to the wavelength control enables the user to select various wavelengths. This is the "λ knob", wherein λ refers to wavelength of light used for the measurement.

== Quantitative measurements ==
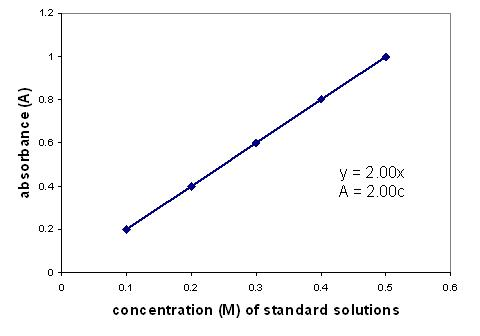
Beer–Lambert Relationship Plot

External videos
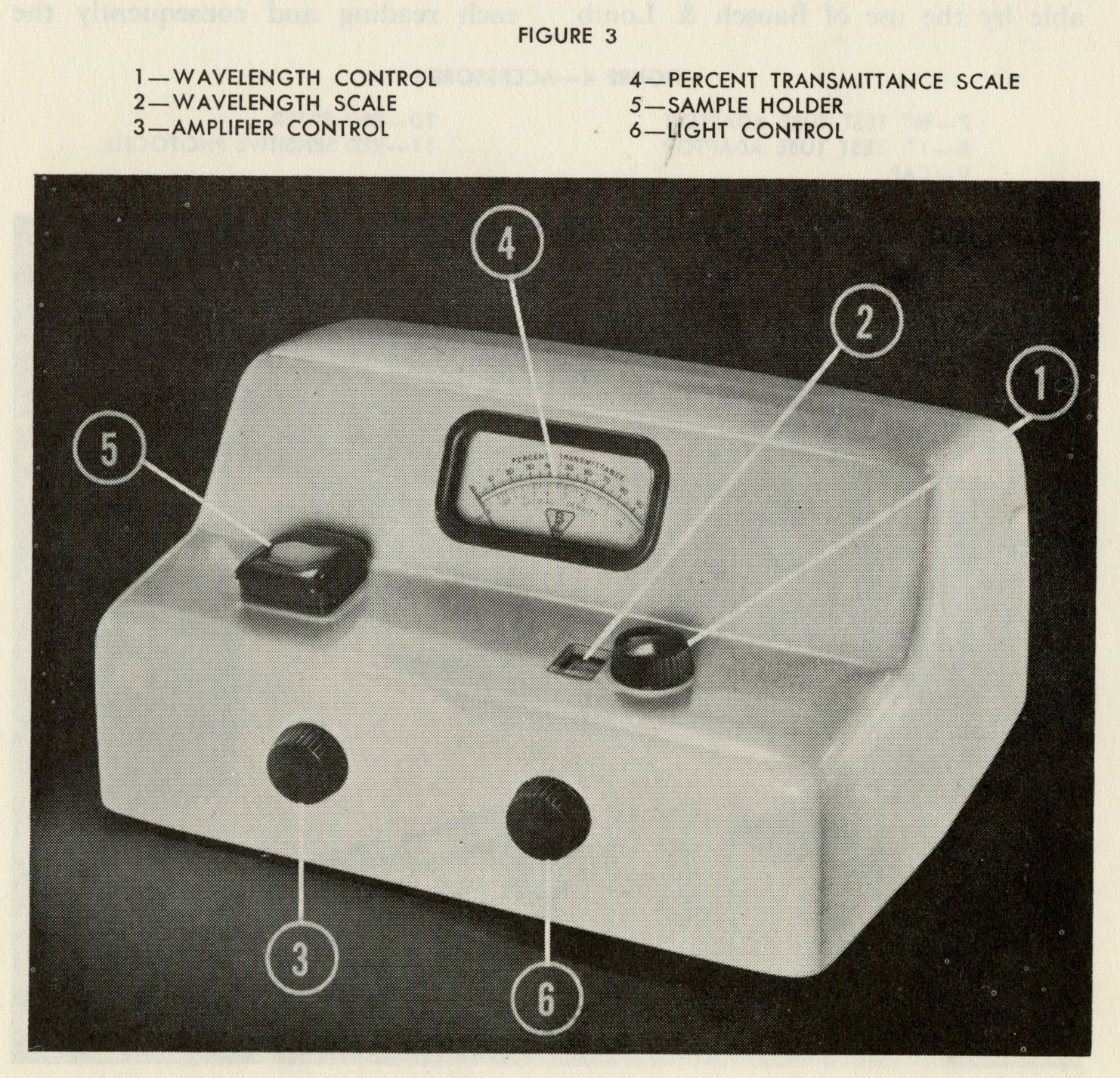
- "Introduction to Colorimetry" (Spectronic 20), David Frank
- "Absorbance Spectrophotometry Video 02, Function test for Spectronic 20+", Robin Aiken
- "Lab Protocol - Spec 200 (Unit 2 Spectrophotometry)", Mark Garcia

Many substances absorb light in the ultraviolet - visible light range. Absorption at any particular wavelength in the ultraviolet visible range is proportional to the concentration of the substances in the solution or other medium, in accord with the Beer–Lambert relationship. In a practical sense, the Beer–Lambert relationship can be stated as:

       A = ε x l x c

in which A is the absorbance measured by the instrument, ε is the molar absorption coefficient of the sample, l is the pathlength of the light beam through the sample, and c is the concentration of the substance in the solution or medium. The Spectronic 20 is thereby commonly used for quantitative determination of the concentration of a substance of interest. The Spectronic 20 measures the absorbance of light at a pre-determined concentration, and the concentration is calculated from the Beer–Lambert relationship.

The absorbance of the light is the base 10 logarithm of the ratio of the Transmittance of the pure solvent to the transmittance of the sample, and so the two absorbance and transmittance can be interconverted. Either transmittance or absorbance can therefore be plotted versus concentration using measurements from the Spectronic 20. Plotting a curve using percent transmittance of light yields an exponential curve. However, absorbance is linearly related to concentration, and so absorbance is often preferred for plotting a standard curve. This type of standard curve relates the concentration of the solution (on the x-axis) to measures of its absorbance (y-axis).

To obtain such a curve, a series of dilutions of known concentration of a solution are prepared and readings are obtained for each of the dilutions (see plot at left). In this plot, the slope of the line is the product ε x l. By measuring a series of standards and creating the standard curve, it is possible to quantify the amount or concentration of a substance within a sample by determining the absorbance on the Spec 20 and finding the corresponding concentration on the calibration curve. Alternatively, the logarithm of percent transmittance can be plotted versus concentration to create a standard curve using the same procedure.

The absorbance measured by the Spectronic 20 is the sum of the absorbance of each of the constituents of the solution. Therefore, the Spectronic 20 can be used to analyze more complex solutions. For example, if a sample solution has two light-absorbing compounds in it, then the user performs measurements at two different wavelengths and constructs standard curves for each compound. Then the concentration of each compound can be calculated algebraically.

The Spectronic 20 can be used for turbidimetric measurements. In microbiological work, the turbidity of a liquid culture of bacterial cells relates to the cell count, and OD600 measurements can be conducted for this purpose using the Spectronic 20. Likewise the turbidity of water suspensions of clays and other particles of size suitable for light scattering can be quantitatively determined by means of a Spectronic 20. In the past, the Spectronic 20 was used for clinical diagnostic purposes.

== Use ==
Before testing a sample, the Spectronic 20 is calibrated using a blank solution, which is the pure solvent that is used in the experimental sample. It is typically water or an organic solvent. In this calibration, the transmittance is set at 100% using the calibration knob of the instrument (the amplifier control knob in the figure at right). The instrument can also optionally be calibrated with a stock solution of a sample at a concentration known to have an absorbance of 2 or else vendor supplied standards, using the light absorption knob in the diagram shown at right. After calibration, the user places a 1/2 inch test tube or cuvette containing the sample solution to be measured into the sample compartment. Calibration is repeated each time the wavelength is changed. It or a standard reference sample is generally used to periodically check for drift. To measure wavelengths above 650 nm, the bottom of the instrument is opened, and a red filter and a red-sensitive photocell is installed.

The original design of the Spectronic 20 utilized an analog dial for readout of transmission from 100%T to 1%T (top scale), 0A - 2A (lower scale). Using the original instrument requires manual setting of the wavelength and making readings from a moving-needle analog display.

External videos
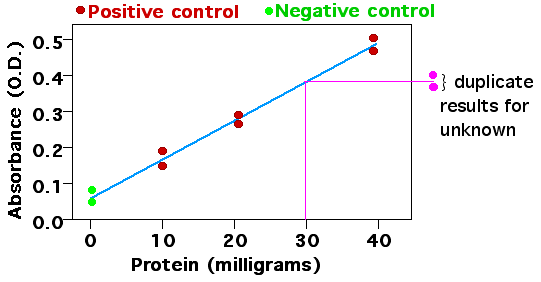
- “The Standard Curve“ (Spec 20 Instructions), Wellesley College

== Replacement ==
The Spectronic 20D (launched in 1985) and later the 20D+ replaced the analog dial with a red digital LED readout, offering greater precision in the readout, if not greater accuracy in the actual reading. A side-by-side comparison of the features of the 20+ and 20D+ is available in the 2001 operating manual.

The Spectronic 20 was replaced by the Spectronic 200 in the Thermo Scientific spectrophotometer product line in 2011. The Spectronic 200 utilizes an array detector and digital control of the measured wavelength, while retaining the characteristic λ knob of the Spec 20 for setting the wavelength. In addition to replicating the user modes of the Spec 20D+ (which it can emulate on a color LCD screen) the Spec 200 accommodates both test-tubes and square cuvettes without needing to install an adapter. Software modes described in the Spectronic 200's specifications include scanning, four wavelength simultaneous measurement, and quantitative analysis with up to four standards, in contrast to the SPEC 20D+ which offered only single point calibration.

== Product line history ==
Originally introduced by Bausch & Lomb in 1953, the product line was sold to Milton Roy in 1985. Milton Roy sold its instrument group to Life Sciences International, renamed Spectronic Instruments, Inc. in 1995. Spectronics Instruments was purchased by Thermo Optek in 1997, renamed Spectronic-Unicam in 2001 and Thermo-Spectronic in 2002. In 2003 the product line was moved to Madison, WI and the brand renamed to Thermo Electron.

With the merger of Thermo Electron and Fisher Scientific in 2006 the brand changed to Thermo Scientific, and remained such until the end of the production run. Spectronic 20 instruments found in labs today may bear any of the Bausch and Lomb, Milton Roy, Spectronic, Thermo Electron or Thermo Scientific brand names.

== Popular culture ==
The Spectronic 20 is apparently one of the few lab instruments to remain intact after the destruction of the laboratory in the movie Back to the Future.
