= Hershel L. Herzog =

- Born: May 4, 1924; Manhattan, New York City, U.S.
- Died: August 4, 1998 (aged 74); Coopersburg, Pennsylvania, U.S.
- Education: B.S. in chemical engineering from University of Illinois, M.S. & Ph.D from University of Southern California
- Years active: c.1945-c.1996
- Known for: prednisone, prednisolone, gentamicin
- Medical career
- Profession: Executive, Pharmaceutical researcher
- Institutions: Caltech, Schering-Plough, L&H Herzog Associates, Inc., Consultant for Chinese Government
- Sub-specialties: Medicinal Chemistry
- Research: Pharmacology

Hershel L. Herzog (1924 – August 4, 1998) was a pharmaceutical researcher for Schering-Plough, then Schering Corporation, where he was ultimately appointed senior vice president of drug development in 1977.

== Education ==
He held a B.S. in chemical engineering from University of Illinois, and M.S. & Ph.D from University of Southern California
