= Fred Hassan =

American businessman

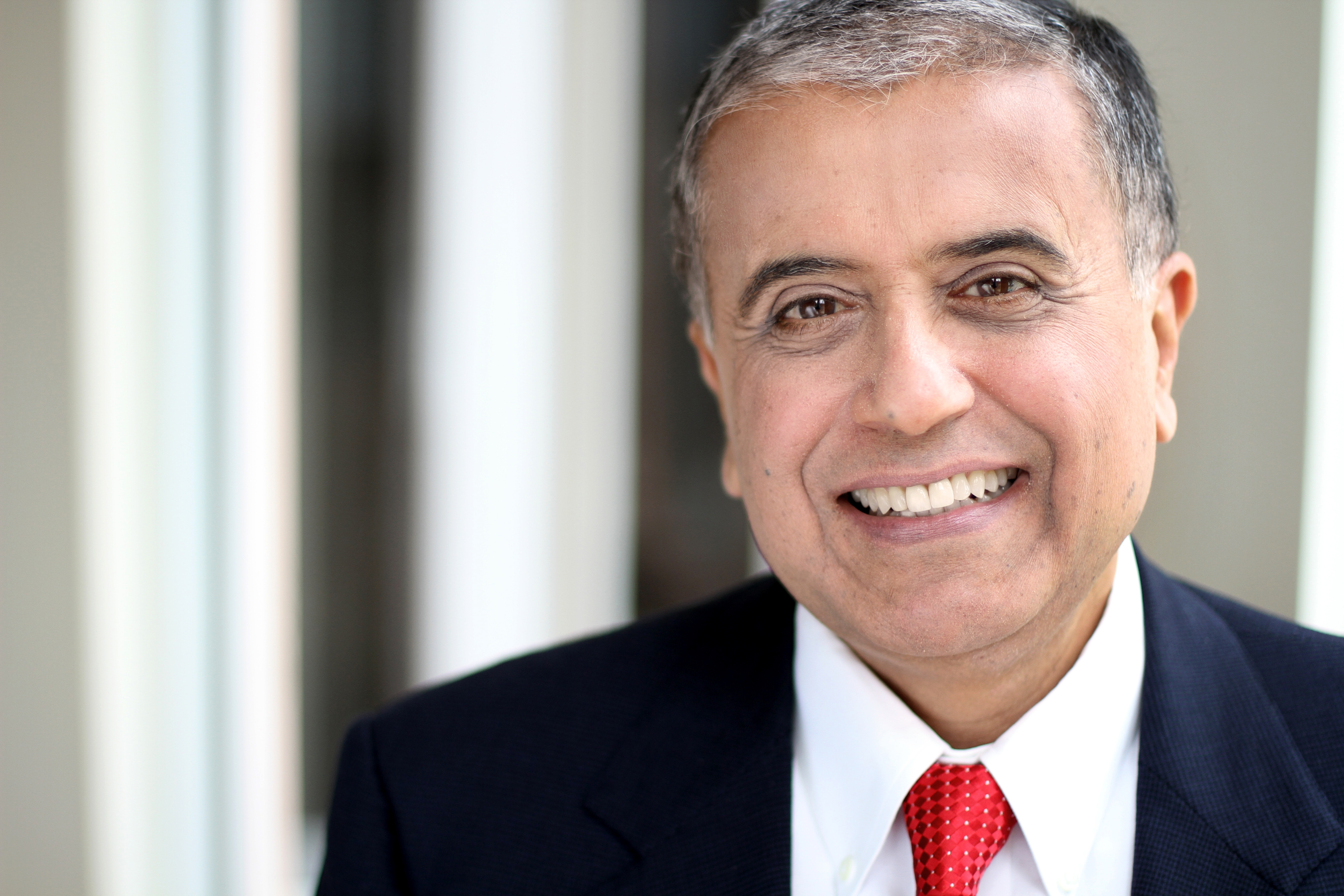
- Born: Farid Hassan; 12 November 1945 (age 80); Multan, Punjab, British India (now Multan, Punjab, Pakistan)
- Citizenship: United States
- Education: Harvard Business School; Imperial College London
- Occupations: CEO of Pharmacia and Upjohn (PNU); Chairman and CEO of Pharmacia (PHA); Chairman and CEO of Schering-Plough (SGP); Chairman of Bausch & Lomb; Director, Warburg Pincus; Chairman of Caret Group of companies
- Years active: 1967–present
- Spouse: Noreen Shah (m. 1969)
- Children: Sabrina Hassan Daniel Hassan Sarah Hassan

Fred Hassan (born November 12, 1945), is an American business executive who works for the private equity giant Warburg Pincus and previously was CEO of three global pharmaceutical companies.

== Early life ==
Fred Hassan was born in British India, in West Punjab, which is in present-day Pakistan. He is the son of Syed Fida Hassan, a Pakistani statesman who also served as Pakistan's ambassador to India. His mother was Zeenat Hassan, a women's rights advocate.

In 1967, Hassan graduated with a bachelor's degree in chemical engineering from Imperial College London. After working in the fertilizer industry with an affiliate of the Delaware-based company Hercules Inc., he enrolled at Harvard and obtained an MBA in 1972. He married Noreen Shah in 1969. They have three children and four grandchildren.

== Career ==
=== 1972–1989 ===
Hassan was hired by Sandoz, at that time an R+D-based global pharmaceutical company (which later became Novartis, after merging with Ciba-Geigy in 1996), while he was still finishing his MBA at Harvard. Eleven years later, he was asked to turn around the largest operating unit, Sandoz US. During the 80s, Sandoz pioneered its move into immunology, starting first with transplantation (cyclosporine) and later, with innovations in cancer therapy. In 1989, Hassan was recruited by American Home Products (AHP)to run their pharmaceutical operation out of Radnor, Pennsylvania.

=== 1989–1997 ===
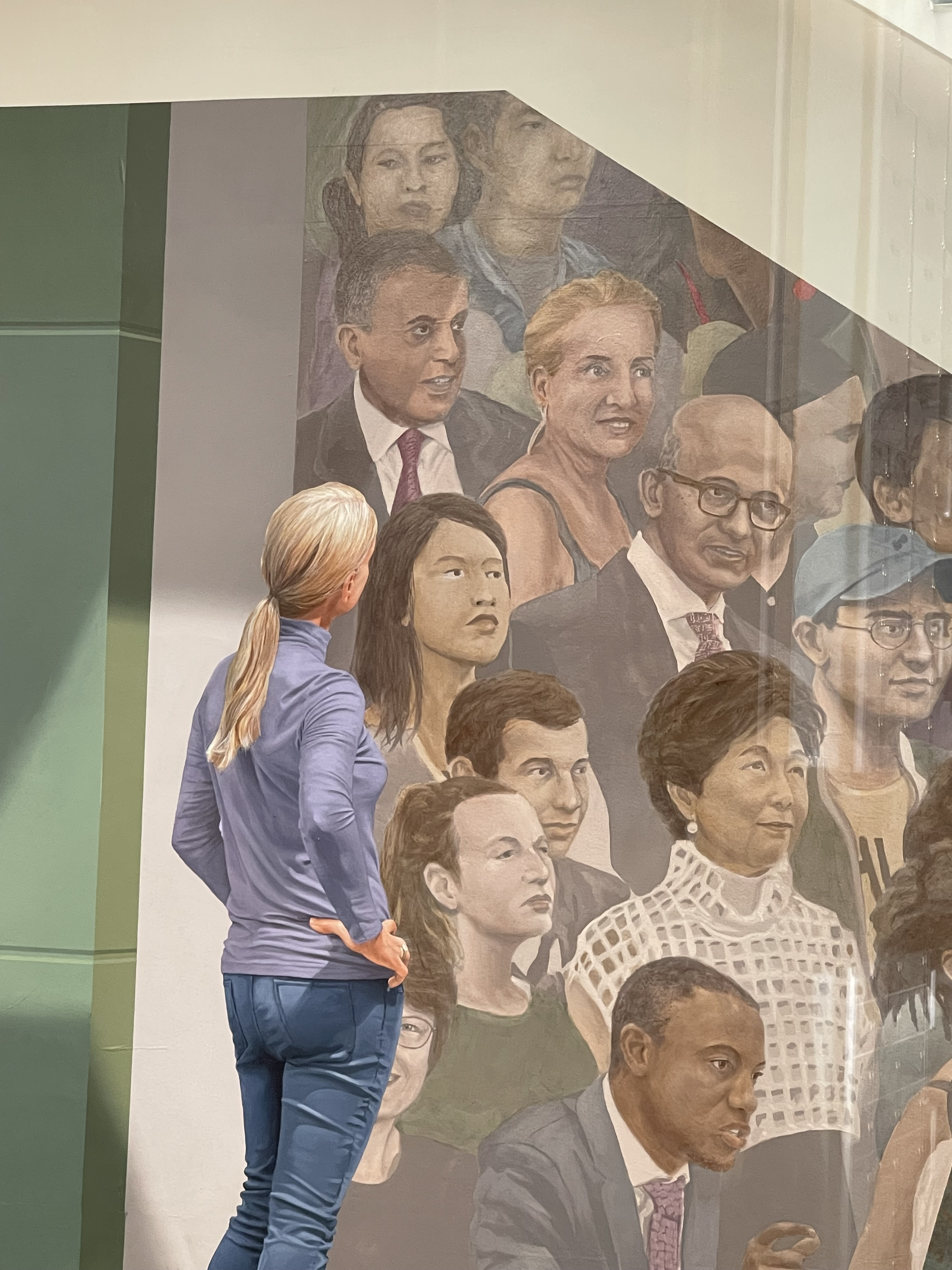
Hassan was selected to be among the 68 people in the mural at the Milken Center for Advancing the American Dream (MCAAD). The museum is located across from the White House

Hassan played an important role in helping transform AHP, later renamed Wyeth (WYE), from a multi-industry conglomerate to a focused, research and development-driven, health care company incorporating: consumer health care, veterinary, medical devices, and with the Wyeth global pharmaceutical business at its core. In 1991, Hassan company hired Robert Levy, formerly head of the Heart, Lung and Blood Institute at the National Institutes of Health, to lead its research and development team. Wyeth (WYE), entered into the biotechnology field by acquiring Genetics Institute in 1991 and the Immunex in 1994 (via acquisition of America Cyanamid. AHP company also acquired A.H. Robins in 1989 and American Cyanamid in 1994 to strengthen its global operations. Important innovations ensued. These included individual blockbuster products i.e. with annual sales of over a billion dollars, including Effexor (anti-depressant), Protonix (a proton pump inhibitor for heartburn), Prevnar (a vaccine to prevent ear infections), and Enbrel an anti-inflammatory and the first powerful biotech to help with joint inflammation in rheumatoid arthritis. Hassan revived the previously moribund macrolide product rapamycin (sirolimus) for transplantation, based on his previous successful with cyclosporin at Sandoz. Not only did rapamycin subsequently make it to the field of transplantation, it also spawned a new class of mTOR inhibitors for cancer, autoimmune diseases, and most recently one of the most exciting concepts to fight aging. Hassan also sponsored the thrust into sophisticated vaccines, later resulting in blockbuster Prevnar. In 1997, Hassan was asked to take over as CEO of the then failing merger of Pharmacia & Upjohn (PNU).

=== 1997–2000 ===
As CEO of Pharmacia & Upjohn (PNU), Hassan made many swift changes, including moving its headquarters from the UK to New Jersey. The New York Times called this the "Fred Factor: investors' belief that the man who masterminded American Home Products' ascension can do an encore." Fifteen months after Hassan took charge, the Wall Street Journal ran an article titled "Turnaround becomes a reality at Pharmacia and Upjohn". PNU acquired the pre-revenue cancer company Sugen in 1999 for $650 million, which subsequently yielded Sutent, a billion dollar product. In 2000, PNU completed a mega-merger with Monsanto (MON) to become Pharmacia (PHA). In the three years leading to Hassan's next CEO assignment, as head of PHA, PNU's stock value had morphed from $15 billion to $52 billion.

=== 2000–2003 ===
As CEO, and later as chairman and CEO of Pharmacia (PHA), Hassan oversaw the establishment of Celebrex as a blockbuster product for pain and inflammation, and the carve-out, followed by a successful initial public offering of the agricultural business under the name "Monsanto" (MON). Monsanto (MON) saw major value expansion and was subsequently acquired by Bayer for $62.5 billion. In July 2002, Pfizer approached PHA with a 44 percent premium and a $62 billion merger was announced. Shortly after the merger closed in April 2003, Hassan took over as chairman and CEO of Schering Plough (SGP), then another global pharmaceutical company undergoing extreme challenges.

=== 2003–2009 ===
As chairman and CEO of Schering Plough (SGP), Hassan oversaw the resolution of multiple urgent legacy legal, regulatory, research and development, operational and balance sheet challenges and was able to declare a company turnaround by 2005. Products, including Nasonex (allergies), Remicade (inflammation), Temodar (brain cancer), OTC Claritin (allergies), OTC Miralax (laxative), grew strongly in the marketplace. In 2007, Schering Plough acquired Organon, a Dutch company and successful innovations came from Organon's research and development, including Keytruda (cancer), Implanon (long acting contraception) and Bridion (faster recovery from anesthesia). Keytruda, the product from Organon R&D, and acquired by Schering Plough, is expected to become the largest pharmaceutical product in the world annualizing $30 billion in sales by 2026 as part of Merck. In late 2009, Schering Plough merged with Merck & Co (MRK), and Hassan left for Warburg Pincus (WP), a private equity company in New York City. "During Fred's tenure of six and a half years, Schering Plough's stock rose 62 percent, versus a drop of 21 percent for the unweighted basket of six peers."

=== 2009–present ===
Hassan has played varying roles at Warburg Pincus, including as a Partner and managing director. He served as chairman of Bausch and Lomb until its sale to Valeant in August 2013. Hassan's board memberships included Time Warner (content and TV networks), Modernizing medicine (electronic medical records) Eyepoint Pharma, (eye diseases), Amgen(AMGN)(biotech), BridgeBio (rare diseases), Intrexon(XON) now Precigen(PGEN) (synthetic biology), Prometheus Biosciences,(precision immunology) and chairman of Theramex (a global women's health company, headquartered in London, UK).

In 2010, Hassan pioneered a family startup IMHealth Science as part of his holding company, Caret Group. IMHealth Sciences was the innovator of three #1 doctor recommended non-prescription products- IBgard® (for IBS (Irritable Bowel Syndrome)), FDgard® ((Functional Dyspepsia (Recurring Indigestion)), and REMfresh® (advanced non-drug formulation for 7 hour sleep support)). These three products were supplemented with an acquisition in 2017, of Fiber Choice® (daily prebiotic chewable fiber), which then subsequently also became a #1 doctor recommended non-prescription product. All four products were widely carried by retail stores and were also available online. This line of four products was annualizing at over $40 million a year and growing at 40% when they were acquired by Nestle Health Science on September 1, 2020.

== Achievements ==
In 1997, Hassan founded Community Hope's Sparkle of Hope Gala which helps challenged individuals, including homeless veterans, to overcome or manage mental health issues and, where possible, lead a purposeful and stable life. As of 2024, over 21 million dollars had been raised to help several thousand clients over the 26 years since this annual gala was founded.

As chairman of the Pharmaceutical Research and Manufacturers Association (PhRMA) (from 2002 to 2003) and president of the International Federation of Pharmaceutical Associations (IFPMA) (from 2006 to 2009), Hassan led initiatives on voluntary guidelines for promotional practices and for fuller disclosure of clinical trials. In 2003, Hassan was the chairman of Pharma and participated in work leading to the pivotal Medicare prescription drug benefit (Part D) which led to drug coverage for seniors, going up from 60% to 90% and with a modest monthly premium of $35, all delivered by the private sector. He worked inside the PhRMA board to start patient assistance programs, and in New Jersey, received appreciation from the Health Care Institute of New Jersey for expediting the patient assistance program, Rx4NJ in 2006. Hassan was on the panel in Dallas in 2006, before the CEOs from the 120 largest companies when he advocated the concept of "consumer driven" healthcare plans (CDHPs) along with increased health literacy among employee enrollees. The alternative for employers at that time was to either ration or to disenroll their employees from health insurance. This initiative became a success as overall enrollment in these "personal responsibility plans" grew from 4% of employer sponsored insurance to 28% in 2022.

He was one of PhRMA's top team members who worked on the Affordable Care Act in 2009, which greatly helped reduce the population of the uninsured.

In 2008, he was asked to be on the "CEO of the Year" Selection Committee by the CEO Group and remains a member. Since 2022, he has chaired the meeting of this selection committee. The 2023 CEO honoree was Ed Bastian, CEO of Delta Air Lines, and the 2024 CEO honoree is Lis Su, CEO of AMD.

In 2012, Hassan was the founding participant of RDL (Research & Development Leadership) summit as an ongoing annual forum for Life Sciences R&D leaders, CEOs, and industry specialists, to gather and discuss R&D productivity, innovations and access to medicines. About 100 participants attend this event annually, held typically in Palm Beach, Florida in March.

In 2012 Hassan co-founded "The CEO Forum" with Accenture. In this annual forum, held every January in San Francisco, Life Sciences CEOs come together and discuss management strategies. These CEOs typically include those from the highest market capitalization companies in Global Pharmas, Insurance, Global Med Tech, Global online and retail operators, Contract Development and Manufacturing Organizations, and Consumer Health Care Companies. Companies whose leaders have attended these include Bayer Pharma, Bristol Myers Squibb, Cigna Express Scripts, CVS Caremark Aetna, Lilly, Merck, Nestle Health Science, Roche, Baxter, Novo Nordisk, Glaxo, Novartis, Pfizer, United Health, and Walgreens Alliance Boots.

Since 1987, Hassan has been frequently sought by media companies to comment on various events on national TV and on other platforms. In 2020, he appeared 9 times on TV in this regard.

In July 2021, Hassan was asked by his alma mater Imperial College of Science, Technology and Medicine to do a keynote at the end of its course for entrepreneurs representing multiple countries.

In 2023, Fred Hassan was among the 68 immigrants to America who were selected for the mural in the Milken Museum for advancing the American Dream (MCAAD)

=== Awards ===
- CEO of the Year award, Financial Times (1999)
- 50 Best CEO's, Worth (1999)
- Ellis Island Medal of Honor (1999)
- America's Best CEO's, Institutional Investor Magazine (2008)
- CEO of the Year, Scrip (2009)
- Most profound impact on the world of business in the previous quarter century, CNBC panel (2014)
- Harvard Business School Healthcare Alumni Ellerin Award (2015)
- "Entrepreneur of the Year" (Florida) (2019)
- "Lifetime Achievement in Governance," NACD New Jersey Chapter (2023)
- Achievement of Excellence Award: Presented by the Chabad Center for Jewish Discovery: Founder Dinner (2019)

=== Articles ===
Book: * 2013 – "Reinvent, A Leaders Playbook for Serial Success"

Articles in Harvard Business Review:

- 2003 – "In Search of Global Leaders"
- 2006 – "Leading Change from the Topline"
- 2011 – "The Frontline Advantage"

=== Other articles ===
- 2013 – "So You Want to Be a CEO. Start Here", J. Lublin, WSJ
- 2018 – "The big bang is coming to healthcare, and it will speak the next industrial revolution" – CNBC
- 2019 – "The Rule of Three" (the concept of distilling lists to the three items that matter most); Fred Hassan, CEO Magazine
- 2020 – The Arc of Leadership, JP Donlon, NACD Directorship Magazine (September/October) The pictures of the 4 CEOs in the print edition mentioned Mr. Harold S. Geneen ("strict central control leader"), Mr. Welch ("value enhancer and Neutron Jack"), Mr. Mullaly ("executed Ford turnaround") and Mr. Hassan ("Innovation CEO")
- 2020 – "Modern Bioscience Has Risen to the Challenge. Now It's Our Turn"; Chief Executive Magazine, Fred Hassan
- 2020 - "White Paper - How Biopharma Commercial and R&D Can Partner to Accelerate Digital Innovation"; Bright Insight
- 2021 – "Carlyle, Warburg join $123m series D round in Chinese biotech firm Abbisko"; Tech in Asia, Miguel Cordon "'Warburg Pincus, with a long history of investing in life sciences globally, will leverage its network to help the company to accelerate global partnership and global clinical development,' Fred Hassan, a board member of American biopharmaceutical company Amgen, commented on behalf of Warburg Pincus."
- 2021 - "Digital Transformation: A Journey, Not Just a Destination"; Michael Wong, Pharmaceutical Executive Digital
- 2021 - "Why Bioscience Will Increasingly Call The Plays", Fred Hassan & Göran Ando, Life Science Leader
- 2021 - "Fred Hassan Proves Big Pharma Can Have A Big Heart", IBTimes
- 2021 - "Fred Hassan's PE Portco Playbook: 'Make The Culture Your Competitive Weapon,' Chief Executive Net
- 2022 - "Lose The Sale, Not Your Integrity," IB Times
- 2022 - "Fred Hassan on Leading Through Mind-Bending Torque Change", Chief Executive Net
- 2023 - "Veteran CEO and Director Fred Hassan - Ask The Tough Questions," Corporate Board Member
- 2024 - "Amplify Your Bandwidth - The Present Gen CEO Playbook," Chief Executive Net

=== Philanthropy ===
Fred Hassan Orangerie – Fairleigh Dickinson University, New Jersey: 2014

Newark Academy Sports Center; New Jersey: 2003

=== Patents ===
The USPTO lists 76 patents (already granted as well as pending).

Business positions
Preceded by Jan Ekberg (acting)	President and CEO of Pharmacia; May 1997 – April 2003
Preceded by Richard de Jongh Osborne (acting)	Chairman of Schering-Plough; April 2003 – November 3, 2009
Preceded by Richard J. Kogan	CEO of Schering-Plough; April 2003 – November 3, 2009
Preceded by Gerald M. Ostrov	Chairman of Bausch & Lomb; March 2010 – August 5, 2013
