= Bioassay =

Analytical method to determine potency and effect of a substance

Bioassay setup

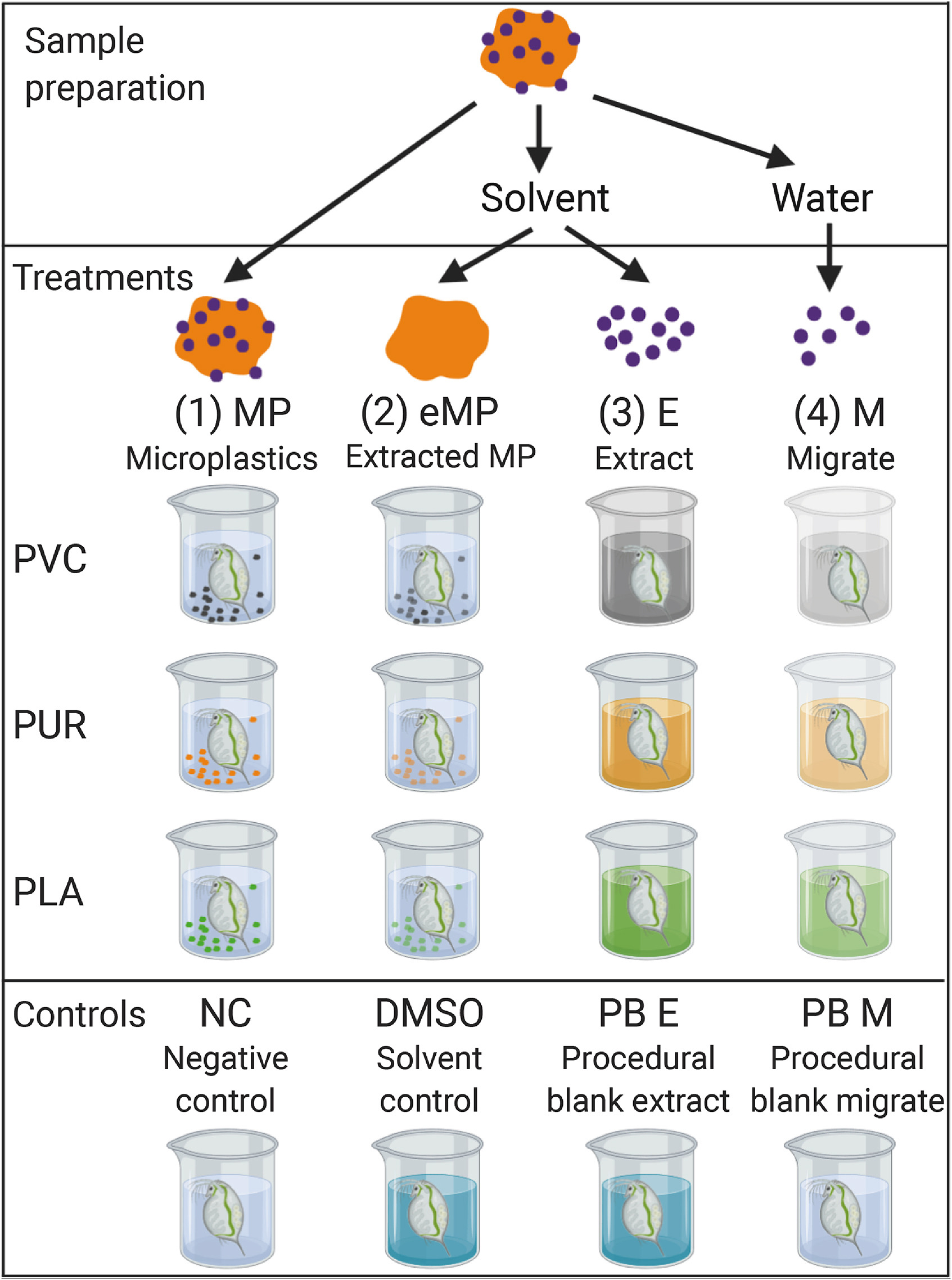
A biological test system (here: Daphnia magna) is exposed to various experimental conditions (here: several microplastics preparations), to which it reacts.

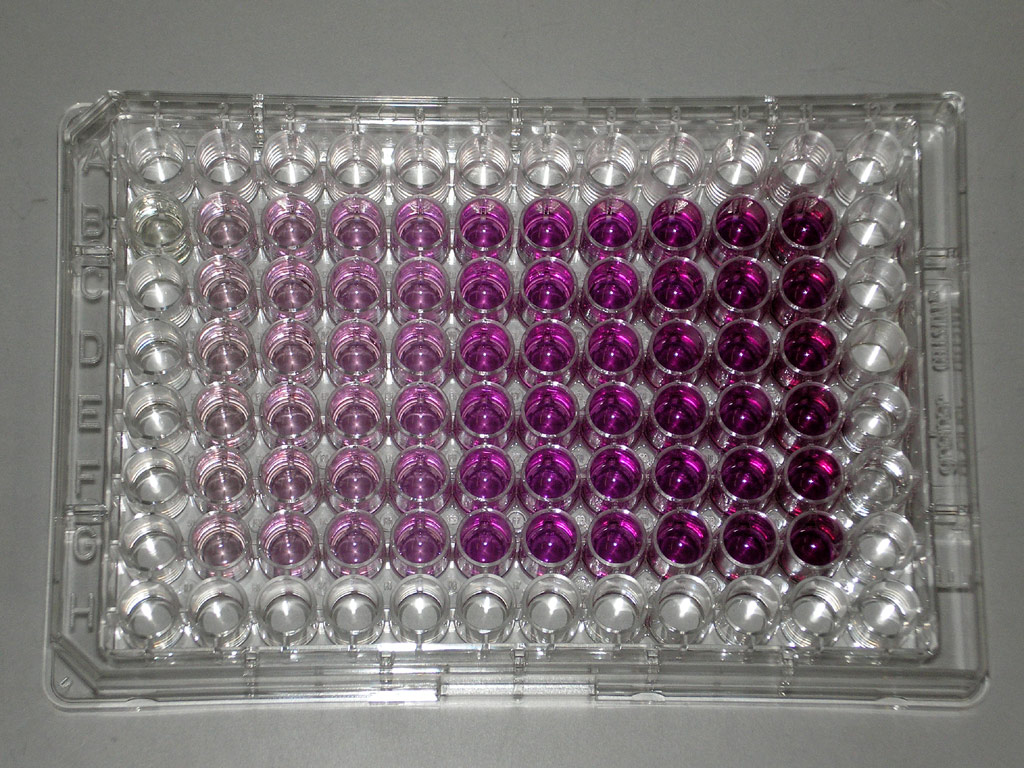
Some indicator of these reactions (e.g. a color change) is assessed, typically in a highly automated fashion through microplates like this.

A bioassay is an analytical method to determine the potency or effect of a substance by its effect on living animals or plants (in vivo), or on living cells or tissues (in vitro). A bioassay can be either quantal or quantitative, direct or indirect. If the measured response is binary, the assay is quantal; if not, it is quantitative.

A bioassay may be used to detect biological hazards or to give an assessment of the quality of a mixture. A bioassay is often used to monitor water quality as well as wastewater discharges and their impact on the surroundings. It is also used to assess the environmental impact and safety of new technologies and facilities.

Bioassays are essential in pharmaceutical, medical and agricultural sciences for development and launching of new drugs, vitamins, etc.

== Principle ==
A bioassay is a biochemical test to estimate the potency of a sample compound. Usually this potency can only be measured relative to a standard compound. A typical bioassay involves a stimulus (ex. drugs) applied to a subject (ex. animals, tissues, plants). The corresponding response (ex. death) of the subject is thereby triggered and measured.

== History ==
The first use of a bioassay dates back to the late 19th century, when the foundation of bioassays was laid down by German physician Paul Ehrlich. He introduced the concept of standardization by the reactions of living matter. His bioassay on diphtheria antitoxin (of von Behring and Kitasato Shibasaburō) was the first bioassay to receive recognition. Originally, the antitoxin was studied on guinea pigs, but they were found to have too much individual variation. To control for this, Ehrlich used in vitro experiments with suspended animal tissues, which proved to be sufficiently uniform to allow quantitative assays. With this he established that antitoxin activity was similar to other chemicals, in that warmth and increased concentration increased the speed at which it inactivates diphtheria toxin.

One well known example of a bioassay is the "canary in the coal mine" experiment. To provide advance warning of dangerous levels of methane in the air, miners would take methane-sensitive canaries into coal mines. If the canary died due to a build-up of methane, the miners would leave the area as quickly as possible.

Many early examples of bioassays used animals to test the carcinogenoxicity of chemicals. In 1915, Yamaigiwa Katsusaburo and Koichi Ichikawa tested the carcinogenicity of coal tar using the inner surface of rabbits' ears.

From the 1940s to the 1960s, animal bioassays were primarily used to test the toxicity and safety of drugs, food additives, and pesticides.

Beginning in the late 1960s and 1970s, reliance on bioassays increased as public concern for occupational and environmental hazards increased.

== Classifications ==
Bioassay can be classified by how it is applied and how the response is recorded.

Direct assay
In a direct assay, the stimulus applied to the subject is specific and directly measurable, and the response to that stimulus is recorded. The variable of interest is the specific stimulus required to produce a response of interest (ex. death of the subject).
Indirect assay
In an indirect assay, the stimulus is fixed in advance and the response is measured in the subjects. The variable of interest in the experiment is the response to a fixed stimulus of interest.

Quantitative response
The measurement of the response to the stimulus is on a continuous scale (ex. blood sugar content, degree of color change in cell growth medium).
Quantal response
The response is binary; it is a determination of whether or not an event occurs (ex. death of the subject).

== Examples ==
Ames test procedure

One classical bioassay is the Ames test. A strain of Salmonella that requires histidine to grow is put on two plates with growth medium containing minimal amounts of histidine and some rat liver extract (to mimick liver metabolism). A suspected mutagen is added to one plate. If the plate with the suspected mutagen grows more visible colonies, it is probably mutagenic: a mutagen might cause the strain of bacterium to regain the ability to make its own histidine.

Most other forms of toxicology testing are also bioassays. Animals or cell cultures may be put under a number of levels of a suspected toxin to ascertain whether the substance causes harmful changes and at what level it does so. The LD_{50} value, a common measure of acute toxicity, describes the dose at which a substance is lethal to 50% of tested animals.

The potency of a drug may be measured using a bioassay.

== Environmental bioassays ==
Environmental bioassays are generally a broad-range survey of toxicity. A toxicity identification evaluation is conducted to determine what the relevant toxicants are. Although bioassays are beneficial in determining the biological activity within an organism, they can often be time-consuming and laborious. Organism-specific factors may result in data that are not applicable to others in that species. For these reasons, other biological techniques are often employed, including radioimmunoassays. See bioindicator.

Water pollution control requirements in the United States require some industrial dischargers and municipal sewage treatment plants to conduct bioassays. These procedures, called whole effluent toxicity tests, include acute toxicity tests as well as chronic test methods. The methods involve exposing living aquatic organisms to samples of wastewater for a specific length of time. Another example is the bioassay ECOTOX, which uses the microalgae Euglena gracilis to test the toxicity of water samples. (See Bioindicator#Microalgae in water quality)

== See also ==
- Assay
- Immunoassay
- Umu Chromotest
