= Edward Bausch =

American engineer and executive

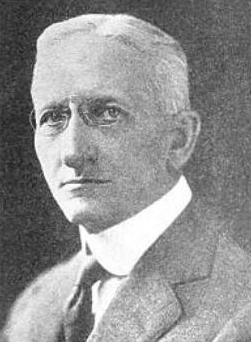
- Born: September 26, 1854; Rochester, New York, US
- Died: July 31, 1941 (aged 86); Rochester, New York, US
- Education: Cornell University
- Occupations: Engineer, business executive
- Parents: John Jacob Bausch (father); Barbara (Zimmermann) Bausch (mother)

Edward Bausch (September 26, 1854 – July 31, 1941) was an American engineer and business executive, who served as president of Bausch & Lomb Optical Company from 1926 to 1935. In 1933, he was named an Honorary Member of the Optical Society "For his preeminent service in the advancement of optics." He was awarded the twelfth ASME Medal in 1936. He served as chairman of the board until his death.

Bausch was born in Rochester, New York to John Jacob Bausch and Barbara (Zimmermann) Bausch. He obtained his engineering degree from Cornell University in 1874. He was a brother of Delta Kappa Epsilon. He spent his life-long career at the optical supply business Bausch & Lomb, where he was president from 1926 to 1935, and saw it "grow from an obscure spectacle shop to an industry of worldwide importance." One of his early accomplishments in the late 19th century was the development and production of the company's first commercial microscope.

He died in Rochester on July 31, 1944.

== Selected publications ==
- Edward Bausch. Manipulation of the microscope. Rochester, N.Y. : Bausch & Lomb optical company, 1891.
