= Abe Plough =

American business owner (1891–1984)

- Born: December 27, 1891; Tupelo, Mississippi, United States
- Died: September 14, 1984 (aged 92); Memphis, Tennessee
- Education: St. Paul Street Grammar School
- Occupation: Businessman
- Years active: 1907–1976
- Known for: Founding of pharmaceutical company that would later be known as Schering-Plough
- Spouse: Jocelyn Plough

Abe Plough (December 27, 1891 – September 14, 1984) was an American business owner who is best known for founding Plough Inc. Plough merged with the German company Schering Corporation in 1971 and became the pharmaceutical company Schering-Plough.

== Early life and education ==
Abe Plough was born in Tupelo, Mississippi, on December 27, 1891, to Moses and Julia Plough, with seven siblings: Sam, Leon, Milton, Alfred, Barney, Morris, and Clara. When he was 11 months old, he and his family moved to Memphis, Tennessee where his father, Moses, operated a clothing and furnishings store. He attended Market Street School and learned to calculate without pencil or paper, which would help him later in life.

Plough also attended and graduated St. Paul Street Grammar School, and he worked at George V. Francis drug store after school and on weekends where he became interested in the pharmaceutical industry. His father Moses encouraged him to build his own business and lent him $125 to start, which he used to create Plough Chemical Company in 1908. At age sixteen, Abe Plough was owner, manager, and only employee of his new business.

== Career ==
Plough started his career at George V. Francis drug store and quickly became interested in the pharmaceutical industry and was given $125 by his father to start his own company, Plough Chemical Company, in 1908. At age sixteen where he sold Antiseptic Healing Oil, a “sure cure for any ill of man or beast.” Success came quickly for his new company as it doubled in size within two years, and branched out into cosmetics Adding aspirin to his line of products in 1920, Plough also bought the St. Joseph Company.

In 1929, during the great depression, Plough raised his employees’ salaries and added one hundred others to his drug store and factory labor forces, and in 1951 transformed his company into Plough Incorporated at 3022 Jackson Avenue, a $2 million plant encompassing 250,000 square feet on six acres of land. The business reported net sales of $254.5 million by 1954, a figure that doubled by 1962. The company eventually merged with Schering Corporation, and started Schering-Plough.

== Later life and death ==
Plough retired in September 1976 at age 84 as board chairman of both Plough Inc. and the Schering-Plough Corp. In 1981 when Plough was 90, his original firm, Plough Chemical Co., celebrated its 75th anniversary with the unveiling of a historical marker on the site where he opened the company. "This is the most wonderful moment of my business career," said Plough.

He died the next year at 92, after he was hospitalized for surgery to remove a blood clot near his brain on August 6. He was released from hospital on September 5, but died 9 days later on September 14, 1984.
