= Ernst Gundlach =

German-American inventor

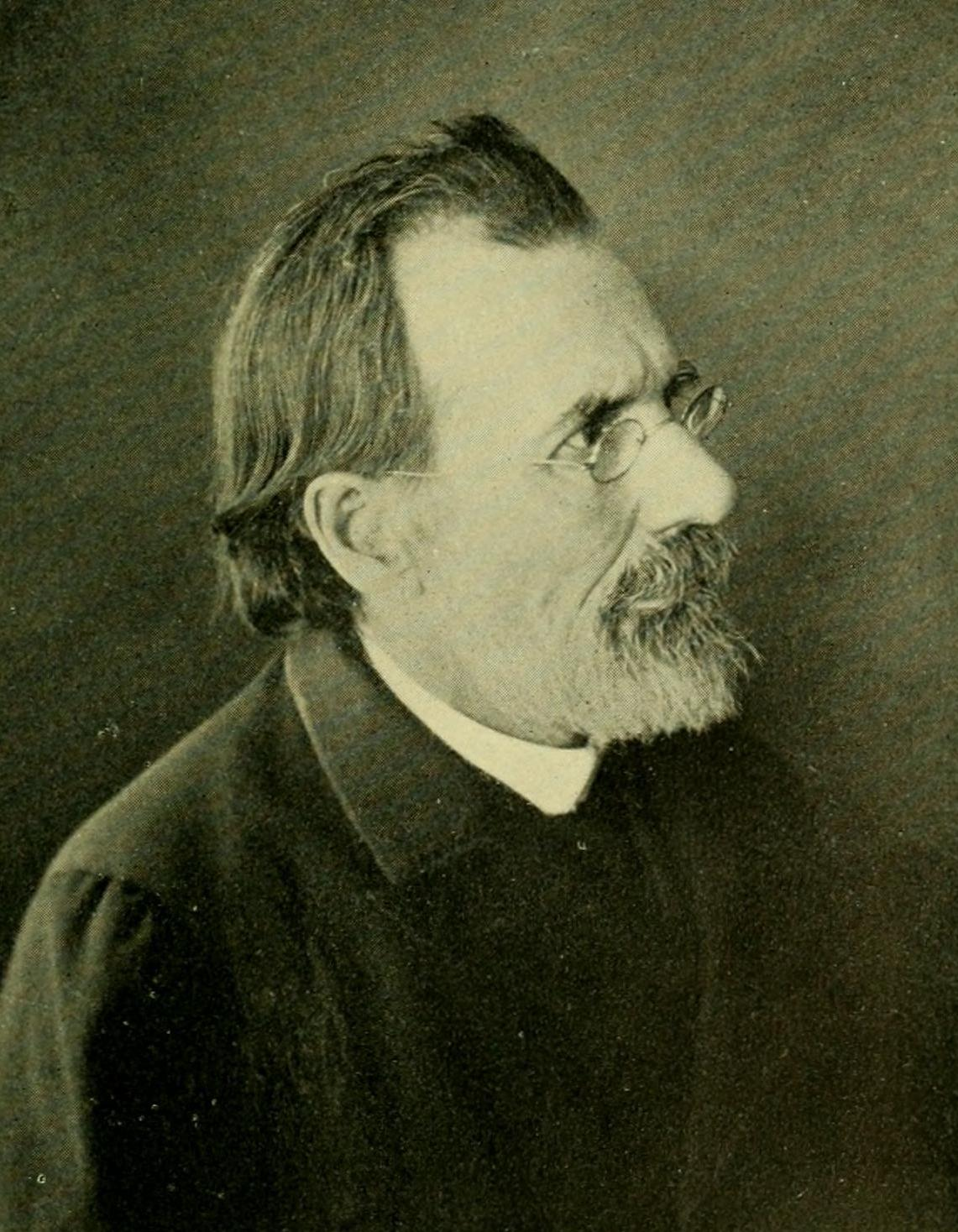
- Gundlach in Camera Craft, July 1900
- Born: 1834; Pyritz, Prussia
- Died: 1908 (aged 73–74); Berlin, Germany
- Occupations: Optical instrument designer and entrepreneur

Ernst Gundlach (1834–1908) was a German-American inventor specialising in the design of optical instruments.

== Life and career ==
Gundlach was born in Pyritz, East Prussia. At the age of 15, he was apprenticed to Carl Friedrich Lewert in Berlin, Germany to learn how to make optical instruments. After four years, having served his apprenticeship he worked in various workshops in Austria, France and England.

In 1876 Gundlach emigrated to the United States. He set up the microscope department of Bausch & Lomb. He later set up a number of optical companies. His first firm, the Gundlach Optical Company was established in Rochester, New York. In 1895 he left the company and founded a new one called Gundlach Photo-Optical Company (later renamed Ernst Gundlach, Son, and Company) which produced photographic lenses. In 1898 the Gundlachs left the company and it became the Rochester Lens Company. In 1904, Gundlach returned to Berlin, where he once again founded a business. He died in 1908

== Patents ==
1. U.S. patent 182,919 – Improvement in Microscopes – 1876 – October 3 – A screw-thread coarse focus, parallel spring fine focus, swinging substage.
2. U.S. patent 198,607 – Improvement in stages for Microscopes – 1877 – December 25 – Sliding stage used on many Bausch & Lomb microscopes.
3. U.S. patent 198,914 – Improvement in Object-Glasses for Microscopes – 1878 – January 1 – Cover slip correction mechanism for objectives.
4. U.S. patent 211,507 – Improvement in Microscope – 1879 – January 21 – Roller guide fine focus mechanism, glass stage plate, detachable object carrier.
5. U.S. patent 222,132 – Improvement in Eye-Pieces and Objectives in Telescopes and Microscopes – 1879 – December 2 – A triplet correction lens to be used in eyepieces.
