= Orbifloxacin =

Chemical compound

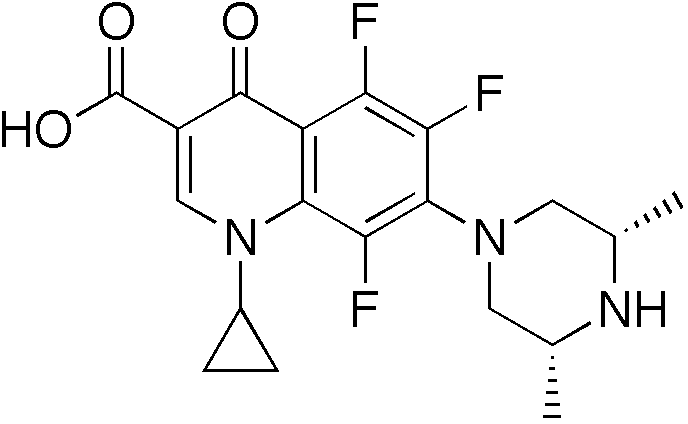

Clinical data
- AHFS/Drugs.com: International Drug Names
- Routes of administration: Oral
- ATCvet code: QJ01MA95 (WHO)

Legal status
- Legal status: Veterinary use only

Identifiers
- IUPAC name: 1-Cyclopropyl-7-[(3s,5r)-3,5-dimethylpiperazin-1-yl]-5,6,8-trifluoro-4-oxo-1,4-dihydroquinoline-3-carboxylic acid
- CAS Number: 113617-63-3
- PubChem CID: 60605
- ChemSpider: 54631
- UNII: 660932TPY6
- KEGG: D08299
- ChEMBL: ChEMBL295433
- CompTox Dashboard (EPA): DTXSID7046201
- ECHA InfoCard: 100.166.510

Chemical and physical data
- Formula: C_{19}H_{20}F_{3}N_{3}O_{3}
- Molar mass: 395.382 g·mol^{−1}
- 3D model (JSmol): Interactive image
- SMILES: O=C(O)C1=CN(C2CC2)c3c(C1=O)c(F)c(F)c(c3F)N4C[C@H](C)N[C@H](C)C4
- InChI: InChI=1S/C19H20F3N3O3/c1-8-5-24(6-9(2)23-8)17-14(21)13(20)12-16(15(17)22)25(10-3-4-10)7-11(18(12)26)19(27)28/h7-10,23H,3-6H2,1-2H3,(H,27,28)/t8-,9+; Key:QIPQASLPWJVQMH-DTORHVGOSA-N

Orbifloxacin (brand name Orbax) is a fluoroquinolone antibiotic which is approved for use in dogs, marketed by Schering-Plough Animal Health.

== See also ==
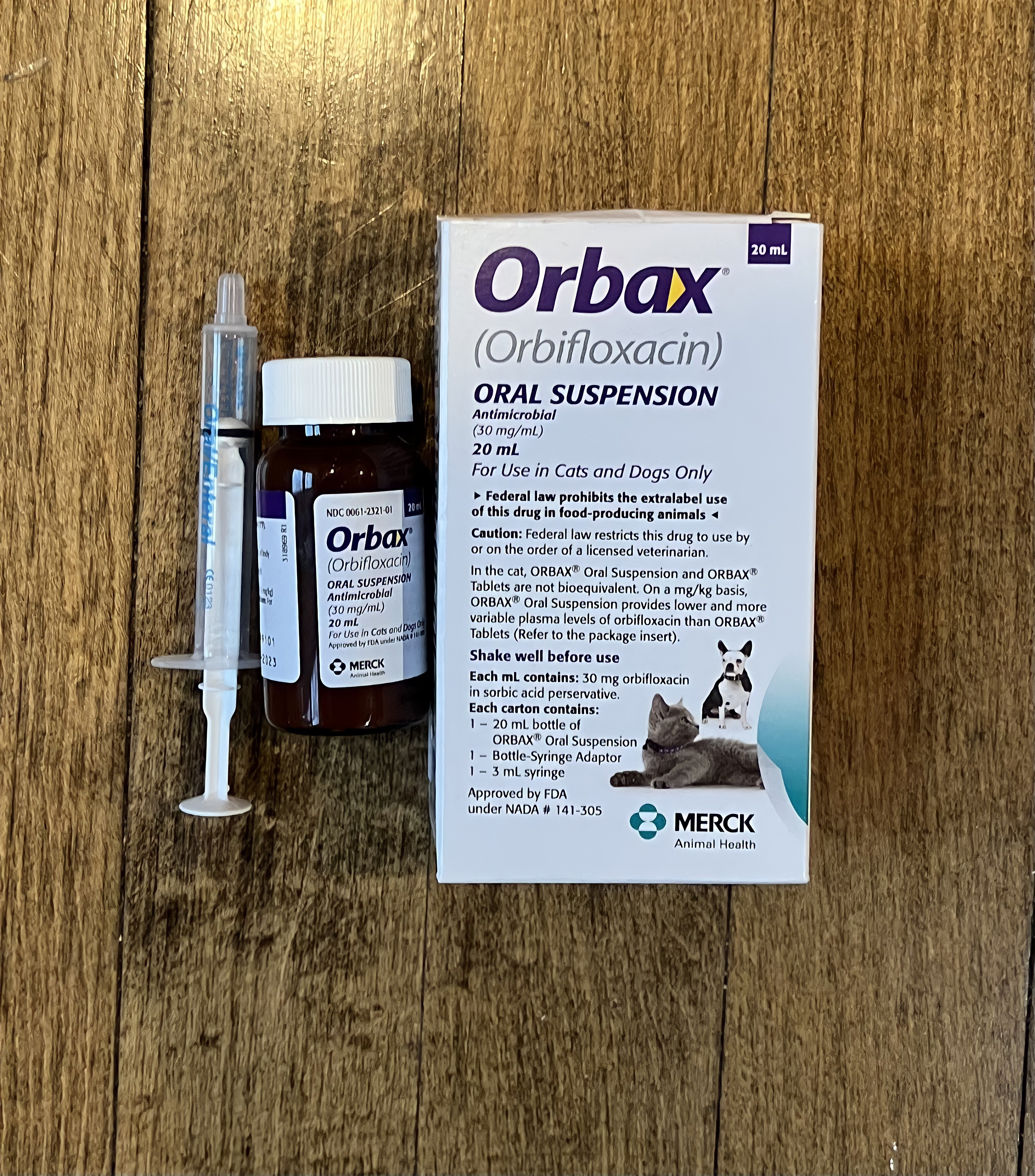
Orbax medication

- Quinolone
