= Henry Lomb =

German-American businessman

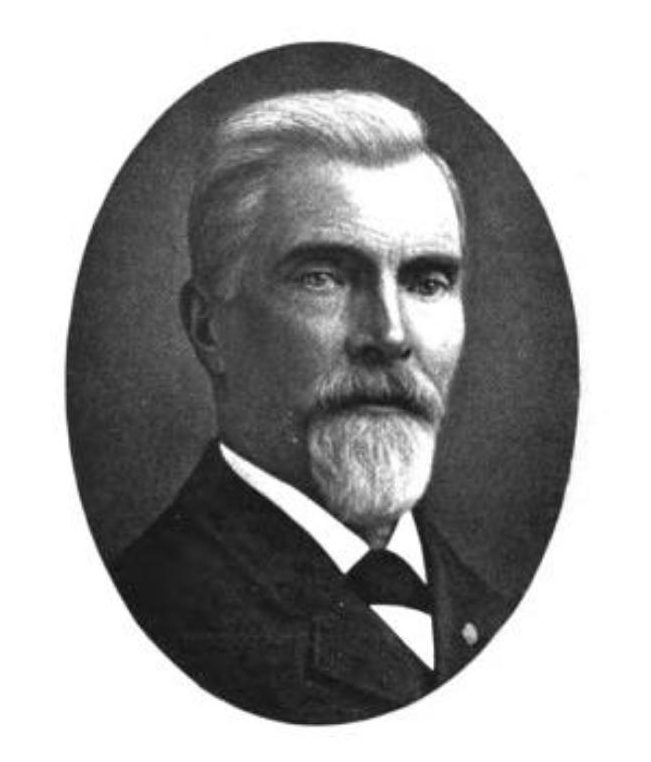
- Born: November 24, 1828; Burghaun
- Died: June 13, 1908 (aged 79)
- Resting place: Mount Hope Cemetery, Rochester, New York
- Occupations: Optician, Businessman
- Known for: Co-Founder Bausch and Lomb

Henry Lomb (born Heinrich Lomb; November 24, 1828 – June 13, 1908) was a German-American optician who co-founded Bausch & Lomb (with John Jacob Bausch) and led a group of businessmen to found The Mechanics Institute, the forerunner of Rochester Institute of Technology.

== Biography ==
Lomb was born in Burghaun, Electorate of Hessen. He emigrated to the United States in 1849 and settled in Rochester, New York, where he worked as a cabinet-maker.

When his friend, John Jacob Bausch, the owner of a retail optical shop in Rochester, needed additional capital in 1854, he loaned him $60 on Bausch's promise that, if the business ever grew to such an extent that he needed a partner, Lomb would be brought in. The business did grow and together they formed the Bausch & Lomb Company.

Lomb enlisted in the 13th New York Volunteer Infantry and fought in the American Civil War as sergeant, lieutenant and captain. He was mustered out in May 1863 when the company was dissolved.

In 1885, Lomb, along with Max Lowenthal, Ezra R. Andrews, Frank Ritter, William F. Peck and others, founded the Mechanics Institute (now Rochester Institute of Technology), whose mission was to offer "education for making a living." Lomb served as chairman of the Institute Board until 1891, and continued to be a strong supporter of the school until his death.

Henry Lomb died suddenly in Pittsford, New York at the age of 79. He is buried in Mount Hope Cemetery in Rochester.

== Legacy ==
The following have been named in Henry Lomb's honor:

- World War II Liberty Ship SS Henry Lomb, hull number 1784
- Henry Lomb School, elementary school #20 in Rochester, New York
- Lomb Memorial Drive and the Bausch & Lomb Center, both on the campus of the Rochester Institute of Technology
