= John Jacob Bausch =

American optician and businessman

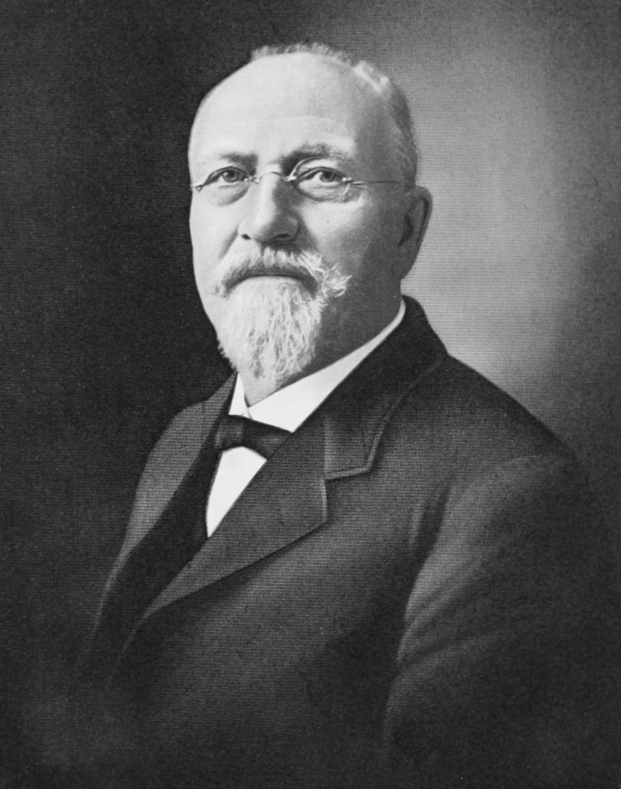
- Born: Johann Jakob Bausch; July 25, 1830; Groß Süßen, Kingdom of Württemberg, German Confederation (now Süßen, Baden-Württemberg, Germany)
- Died: February 14, 1926 (aged 95); Rochester, New York, U.S.
- Resting place: Mount Hope Cemetery, Rochester, New York
- Occupations: Optical instrument maker, businessman
- Known for: Co-Founder Bausch and Lomb

John Jacob Bausch (born Johann Jakob Bausch; July 25, 1830 – February 14, 1926) was a German-American maker of optical instruments who co-founded Bausch & Lomb (with Henry Lomb). Over six decades he transformed his small, local optical shop into a large-scale international enterprise, pioneering the American optical industry.

== Early years ==
Bausch was born Johann Jakob Bausch to Georg Bausch, a baker, and his wife Anna Schmid, in Groß Süßen (today part of Süßen) in the Kingdom of Württemberg, then part of the German Confederation. At the age of eighteen he moved to Bern, Switzerland, where he worked as a lens grinder in an optical shop designing camera lenses. In 1850 he emigrated to the United States. Upon his arrival, he made his way to a German community in Buffalo, New York, but because of a cholera epidemic there he settled in Rochester, New York, and Anglicized his name to John Jacob.

== Business development ==
In 1853, Bausch opened a retail optical shop in Rochester. Bausch sold spectacles, thermometers, field glasses, magnifiers and opera glasses. His friend Henry Lomb, also a German immigrant (from Burghaun, Hesse-Kassel or Hesse-Cassel), who had immigrated in 1849, invested his $60 in savings in Bausch's shop and in 1855, on a handshake, became his partner. By 1856, Bausch renamed the company the "Optical Institute of Rochester."

In the spring of 1861, Lomb enlisted and served in the American Civil War for two years. In Lomb's absence, Bausch accidentally made a fortuitous discovery: he found a piece of vulcanite rubber on a New York street. He took it home and experimented making eyeglass frames from the material. At that time wire frames were mainly made from gold, and horn-rimmed frames were made from either European deer horn or tortoise shell, so eyeglasses were considered an expensive luxury. Bausch realized he could make stronger and less expensive vulcanite eyeglass frames, but soon he struggled to keep up with demand. During the Civil War, the blockade caused the price of gold and European horn to rise dramatically. This resulted in a growing demand for the Bausch and Lomb spectacles made from vulcanite.

In 1864 they renamed the company "Bausch and Lomb, Opticians", and reorganized again as the "Vulcanite Optical Instrument Company" in 1866. They built the first machine in America to produce spectacles beginning in the early 1870s. Lomb was in charge of sales and finance, while Bausch concentrated on the manufacturing side of the business.

The firm took yet another name in 1876, "Bausch and Lomb Optical Company", and began manufacturing microscopes. Later that year they exhibited at the Philadelphia Centennial Exposition. The company also produced photographic lenses (1883), spectacle lenses (1889), microtomes (1890), binoculars and telescopes (1893). The firm was incorporated as "Bausch and Lomb Optical Company, Inc.", in 1908, the year Bausch's long-time partner died.

Bausch's company did very well during the First World War as the war created a demand for binocular telescopes, range-finders, gunsights, searchlight mirrors, periscopes and torpedo tube sights. The U.S. government became Bausch and Lomb's major customer as the company produced related optical instruments for the armed forces. One of their famous products was Ray-Ban sunglasses, until they sold it to the Italian eyewear conglomerate Luxottica.

Bausch led his company for more than six decades. He died on February 14, 1926, in Rochester, New York. Bausch & Lomb continued to flourish under the leadership of his son Edward Bausch, remaining preeminent in its field. It was named to the Fortune 500 list of America's leading companies in 1975.

== Bibliography ==
- "The Bausch & Lomb Story." in About Bausch & Lomb. Bausch & Lomb. Retrieved May 20, 2014.
- "John Jacob Bausch." in Innovation Hall of Fame, Gallery of Innovators. Rochester Institute of Technology. Retrieved May 20, 2014.
- Keen, Ann T. "Bausch, John Jacob and Henry Lomb." American National Biography Online. Retrieved May 20, 2014.
- Kolbow, Berti. "John Bausch." in Immigrant Entrepreneurship: The German-American Business Biography, 1720 to the Present, vol. 2, edited by William J. Hausman. German Historical Institute. Last modified January 25, 2012.
