= Bain de Soleil =

Discontinued brand of sunscreen

- Product type: Sunscreen
- Current owner: Bayer Healthcare LLC
- Country: United States
- Introduced: 1925
- Discontinued: December 2019
- Markets: Worldwide
- Tagline: Bain de Soleil, for the St. Tropez tan
- Website: www.baindesoleil.com

Bain de Soleil was an American brand of sunscreen that was produced by Bayer.

The brand was known for low-SPF products that were typically marketed to women seeking skin tanning. It was affiliated with the Coppertone brand. The name Bain de Soleil is French for "sun bathing." The brand used the slogan "Welcome to a place more colorful." In the 1970s and 1980s, the brand used the slogan (especially featured in television commercials) "Bain de Soleil, for the St. Tropez tan."

The brand was discontinued in December 2019.

== History ==
According to the website:

In the 1920s, the famous, trend-setting Coco Chanel, sporting deeply sun-bronzed skin, turned tanning into a fashion statement. In 1925, capitalizing on this fashion trend, Monsieur Antonine of Paris developed an Orange Gelée dark tanning formula called "Antoine de Paris". The Orange Gelée formula continued to thrive in Europe into the 1940s when Lanvin, a New York based company introduced the silky sensuous gel in the United States as Antoine's Bain de Soleil...translated as Antoine's bath of the sun.

The Bain de Soleil brand transitioned from Procter & Gamble (P&G) to Pfizer in August 1995. The product recipes and certain pieces of manufacturing and packaging equipment were relocated from Hatboro, PA (P&G) to Pfizer Consumer Healthcare Group in Parsippany, New Jersey around October 1995. From November 1995 to 1999, the product was manufactured and packaged at the Pfizer CHCG 100 Jefferson Road, Parsippany, NJ site. During this time, the brand saw the largest portfolio enlargement, including self-tanning (sunless) and after-sun products. These products were all formulated at the same Pfizer site at the 400 Webro Road laboratories. Between 1995 and 1999, the following Bain de Soleil products were marketed:

- Sandbuster Sand-Resistant Oil SPF 2
- Tropical Deluxe SPF 4
- Mega-Tan SPF 4
- Mademoiselle (SPF 4, SPF 8, and SPF 15)
- All Day (SPF 4, SPF 8, SPF 15, SPF 30, Kids SPF 30, and Gentle Block SPF 30)
- SPF + Color (SPF 8, SPF 15, SPF 20) - line renamed to "Sunless Tanning Creme with Sunblock"
- Sunless (Light, Dark, Deep Dark, Tanning Spray Dark, and Tanning Spray Deep Dark)
- Apres Soleil After Sun Revitalizing Aloe Mist
- Apres Soleil After Sun Moisture Replenishing Lotion
- Orange Gelee (SPF 4, SPF 8, SPF 15, and SPF 30)
- Ecran Solaire (SPF 15 and SPF 30 Kids) - Canada

Product development scientists at Pfizer CHCG were John A. Scott (group manager), Alice Scheiner (after sun and high-SPF products), Eric M. Stroud (sunless products), Judy Meyer, Andrew Ortega, and Mary Williams (packaging). Two innovations in 1,3-dihydroxyacetone stability were invented during this time. The entire brand was eventually divested on October 7, 1999, to Schering-Plough.

== Products ==
The final product lineup included:

- Orange Gelée SPF 4
- Spray Transpâre SPF 10
- Mega Tan SPF 4

== See also ==
- Coppertone (sunscreen)
