= Zinka (sunscreen) =

Brand of sunscreen

Zinka is a brand of sunscreen once owned by Schering-Plough. Originating in Southern California and popular in the late 1980s, the zinc oxide product is manufactured in nine colors. Although Zinka is traditionally associated with "colored-noses", the product does come in a clear variety. Zinka Nosecoat provides protection from UVA/UVB rays and is resistant to all weather conditions. The products have received some endorsements by dermatologists, professional athletes and outdoor enthusiasts.

== History ==
Zinka products started in 1986 with the idea of adding color to lifeguards zinc covered noses. After a few months, the company grew from 2 people to 60 employees. Zinka suncare products are made from zinc oxide and come in a variety of 16 colors. The company sponsors professional surfers, volleyball players, and other athletes. Upon their success, Zinka began expanding their products from just nose cover to oils, clear sunscreens, and lip balms. The company is based in Rancho Dominguez, California.

In the following years, the demand for bright colored Zinka products fell.
