= Bausch & Lomb =

Canadian eye health company

Bausch + Lomb Corporation
- Bausch & Lomb's logo used since January 2010
- Type: Public
- Traded as: TSX: BLCO; NYSE: BLCO
- Industry: Medical instruments
- Founded: 1853; 173 years ago in Rochester, New York, US
- Founders: John Bausch; Henry Lomb
- Headquarters: Vaughan, Ontario, Canada
- Key people: Brent Saunders (CEO)
- Products: Eye-care products and equipment
- Revenue: ▲US$3.77 billion (2022)
- Operating income: ▼US$207 million (2022)
- Net income: ▼US$6 million (2022)
- Total assets: ▲US$11.1 billion (2022)
- Total equity: ▼US$7.10 billion (2022)
- Number of employees: c. 12,900 (2022)
- Parent: Bausch Health
- Website: bausch.com

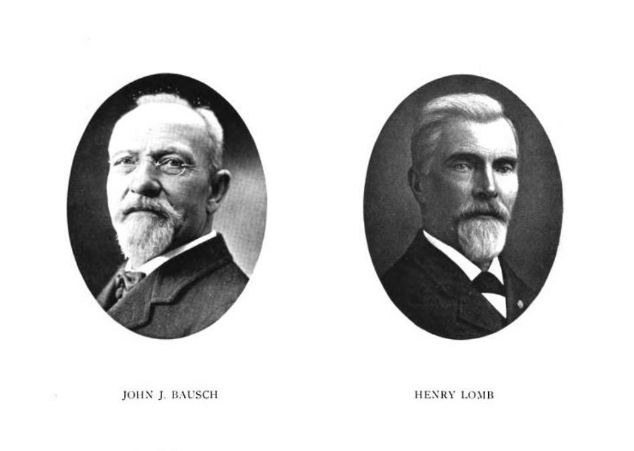
John Bausch and Henry Lomb

Bausch & Lomb (stylized as Bausch + Lomb since 2010) is an eye health products company based in Vaughan, Ontario. It produces contacts and intraocular lenses, medications, and eye surgery-related products.

Founded 1853 in Rochester, New York by optician John Bausch and financed by Henry Lomb, it was one of the oldest continually operating companies in the United States, which was publicly traded on New York Stock Exchange before being acquired by the private equity firm Warburg Pincus in 2007. The company was then sold to the Canadian company Bausch Health in 2013. As of 2022, the company employs about 12,900 people.

== History ==
=== Early years ===
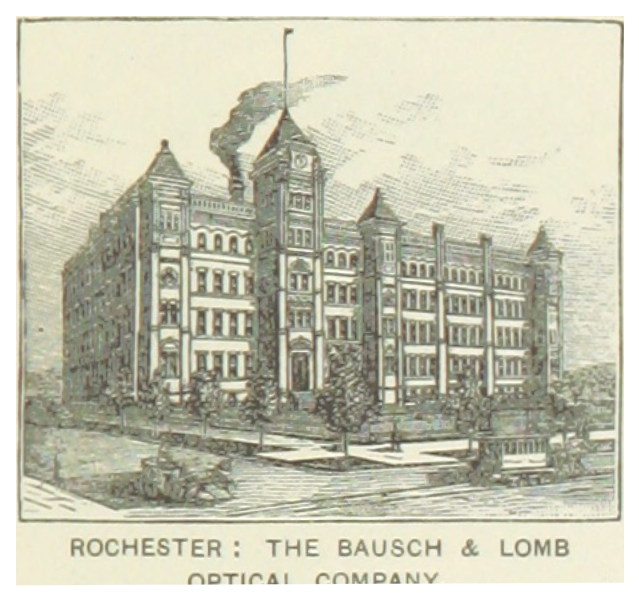
New York headquarters of the Bausch & Lomb Optical Company in 1891

In 1853, John Bausch and Henry Lomb, both German immigrants, established a small but ambitious workshop producing monocles in Rochester, New York. By 1861, their operation had expanded to manufacturing vulcanite rubber eyeglass frames and other precision vision products.

During the American Civil War, the Union blockade caused the price of gold and European horn to rise dramatically. This resulted in a growing demand for the Bausch + Lomb spectacles made from vulcanite.

In 1876, Ernst Gundlach joined the company as it began to manufacture microscopes. Later that year, the Bausch & Lomb Optical Company won a distinction at the Philadelphia Centennial Exposition. The company also produced photographic lenses (1883), spectacle lenses (1889), microtomes (1890), binoculars and telescopes (1893). From 1892 in cooperation with Zeiss in Germany, the company produced optical lenses. In this manner, at the end of the 19th century, the product range included eyeglasses, microscopes and binoculars, as well as projectors, camera lenses and camera diaphragms.

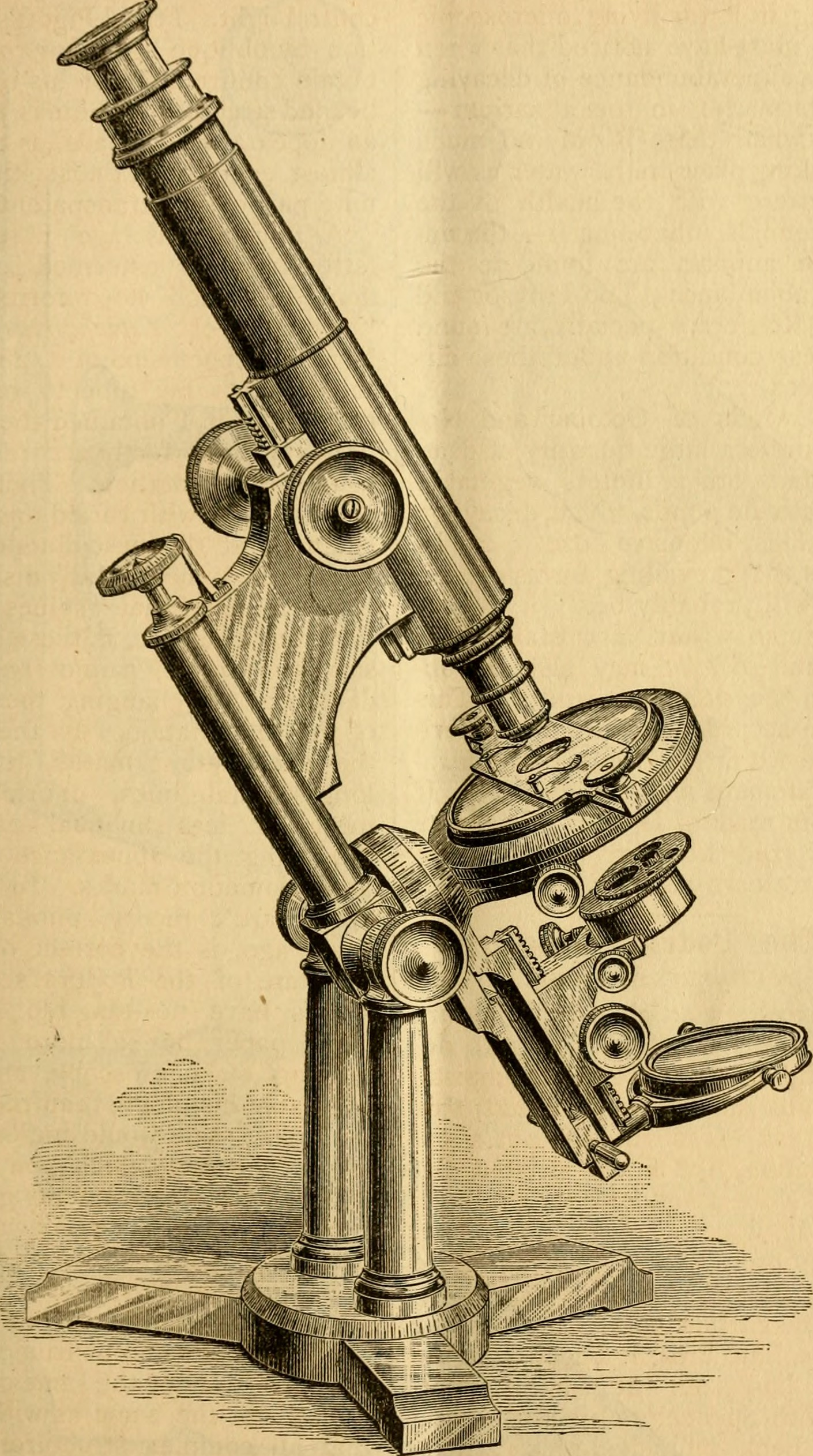
Microscope, 1883

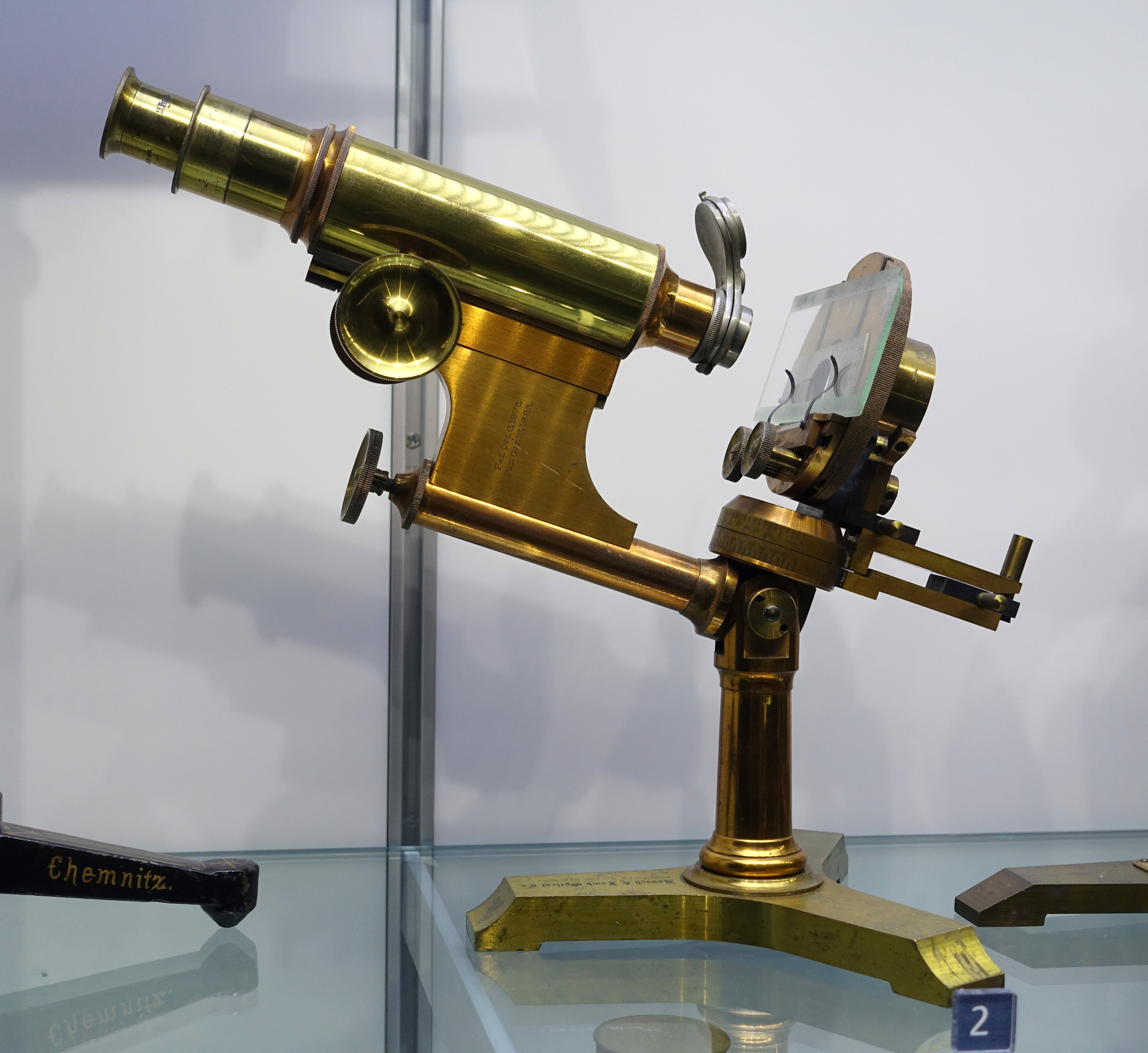
Universal Microscope, Bausch and Lomb, c. 1890

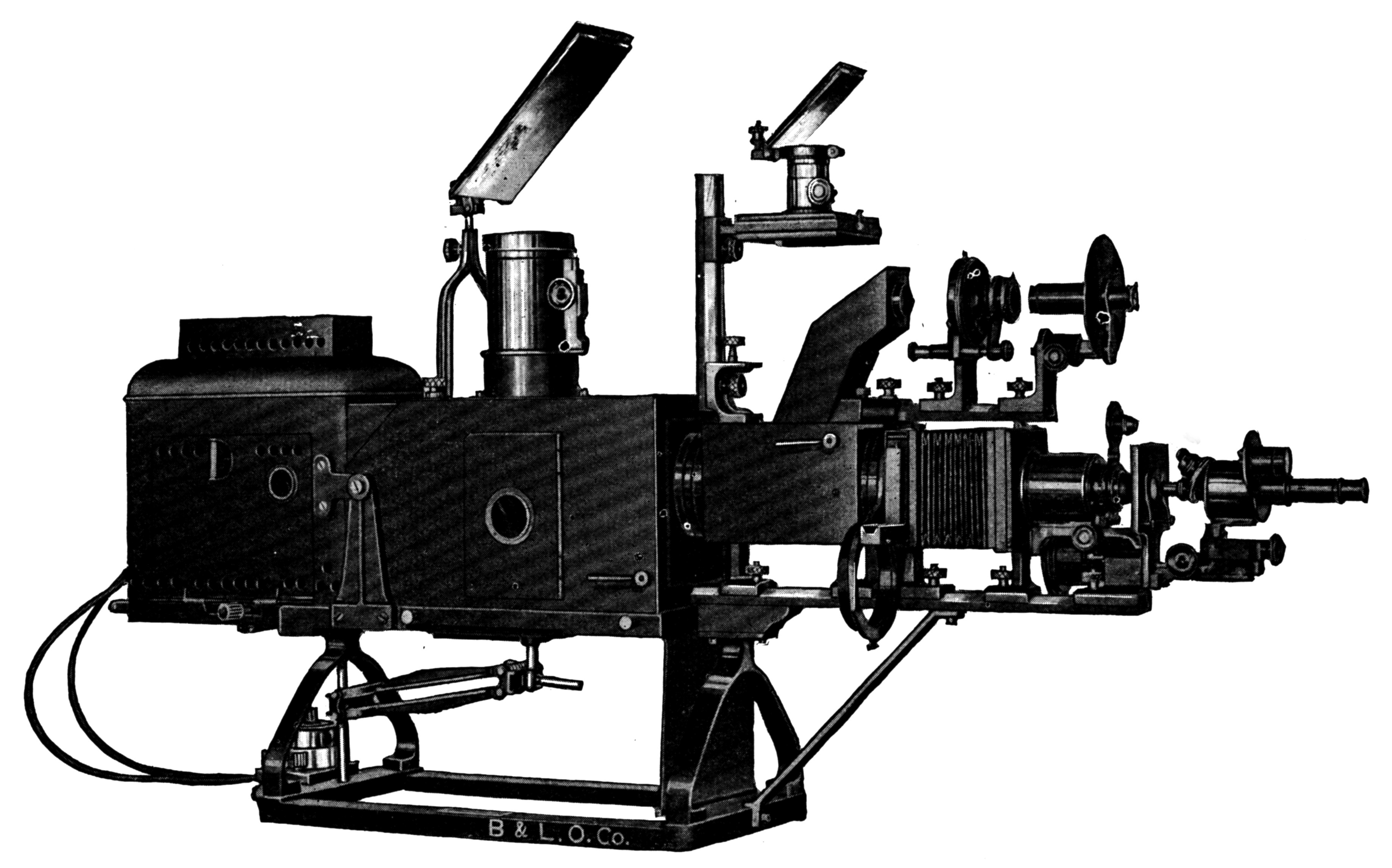
Bausch & Lomb Convertible Balopticon projector, c. 1913

=== 20th century ===
With the growth of the US army, under President Theodore Roosevelt and the buildup of the naval fleet, Bausch & Lomb received the commission, through the supplier Saegmuller, to manufacture high-precision lenses for optical measurement and founded a joint venture with Saegmuller. At the same time as this new expansion, a research department with five members was started to develop new products and improve old ones. A new alliance with the Zeiss company in Germany ensured competitive advantages for the three participants, Bausch & Lomb, Saegmuller and Zeiss, in terms of patent use and opening new markets. In 1902, William Bausch, the son of the founder, developed a process to create the desired lens shape directly by casting molten glass. Previously, the glass parts for the lenses had to be separated, ground and polished in a complicated process, and this brought significant savings in time and materials.

The company produced the first optical-quality glass in America during the early to mid-1900s. By the year 1903 the company began manufacturing microscopes, binoculars, and camera shutters.

The further development of the firm was affected by political events. Because of the World Wars and the consequent need for optical instruments such as field glasses, range finders, camera lenses, binocular telescopes, searchlight mirrors, torpedo tube sights, and periscopes, the product range could be considerably broadened. Until World War I, optical glass and the instruments made from it (including many military instruments) were often imported into most European and North American countries from Germany. The same was also true of chemical products and laboratory equipment. The outbreak of the war, with Germany's new enemy status, created a scramble to rapidly enhance the domestic industries. In 1933, Bausch + Lomb started to honor outstanding high school science students with the Bausch+Lomb Honorary Science Award. In the 1930s, military products represented 70% of total production. The Ray-Ban brand of sunglasses was developed for pilots in 1936.

At a time when the cinema was being superseded by television, Bausch & Lomb developed improved optics for the CinemaScope process, which popularized the film-based anamorphic format and led most cinemas to double the widths of their screens.

In 1965 Bausch & Lomb acquired the patent for the hydrogel contact lenses created by Czech scientists Otto Wichterle and Drahoslav Lím. In 1971, after three years of development work, two years for the medical approval by the United States Food and Drug Administration and an investment of three million USD, Bausch + Lomb launched contact lenses made of Poly-HEMA. In contrast to the contact lenses previously available, made of glass and Lucite (acrylic glass), the new lenses were softer. They were marketed under the brand name "Soflens".

In the 1970s, the company was a major producer of spectrophotometers for the dye and chemical business, such as the Spectronic 20.

A massive restructuring of the company began in the mid-1980s. What had been the core divisions, the production of lenses for various purposes, were sold off. The sunglasses division was continued as Ray-Ban and kept selling well due to effective product placement. By the planned acquisition of other firms, such as Polymer Technology Corporation and Dr. Mann Pharma, existing business areas such as contact lens production were strengthened and new ones were initiated.

In 1997, as a result of a series of company acquisitions, the division for the manufacture of surgical products was established. The Ray-Ban brand was sold in 1999 to the Italian Luxottica Group.

=== 21st century ===
Since then, Bausch & Lomb has developed into a globally operating company which is one of the largest producers of contact lenses. As of 2022, about 12,900 employees in approximately 100 countries work for the firm.

Competitors in the international eye care products market are Johnson & Johnson, Allergan, Alcon, MSD-Chibret, CooperVision, Menicon Co., Hoya Corporation, EssilorLuxottica and Carl Zeiss Meditec.

In 2023, Bausch + Lomb Corp announced it would buy Xiidra from Novartis for $1.75 billion and pay additional $750 million in linked to future sales for Xiidra as well as two pipeline asset.

In 2025, Bausch + Lomb's subsidiaries closed an offering of $790.6 million.

Chief executives
Name	Title	Tenure
John Jacob Bausch	President	1885–1926
Edward Bausch	President	1926–1935
M. Herbert Eisenhart	President	1935 – December 1950
Joseph F. Taylor	President	January 1951 – November 1954
Carl S. Hallauer	President	November 1954 – March 1959
William W. McQuilkin	President	March 1959 – May 1971
Jack D. Harby	President	May 1971 –
Daniel G. Schuman	CEO	– April 1981
Daniel E. Gill	CEO	April 1981 – December 1995
William M. Carpenter	CEO	1996 – June 1998
Ron Zarella	CEO	2001–2008
Gerald Ostrov	CEO	2008 – March 2010
Brent Saunders	CEO	February 2010 – August 2013
Joseph C. Papa	CEO	May 2016 – March 2023
Brent Saunders	CEO	March 2023 – present

== Operations ==
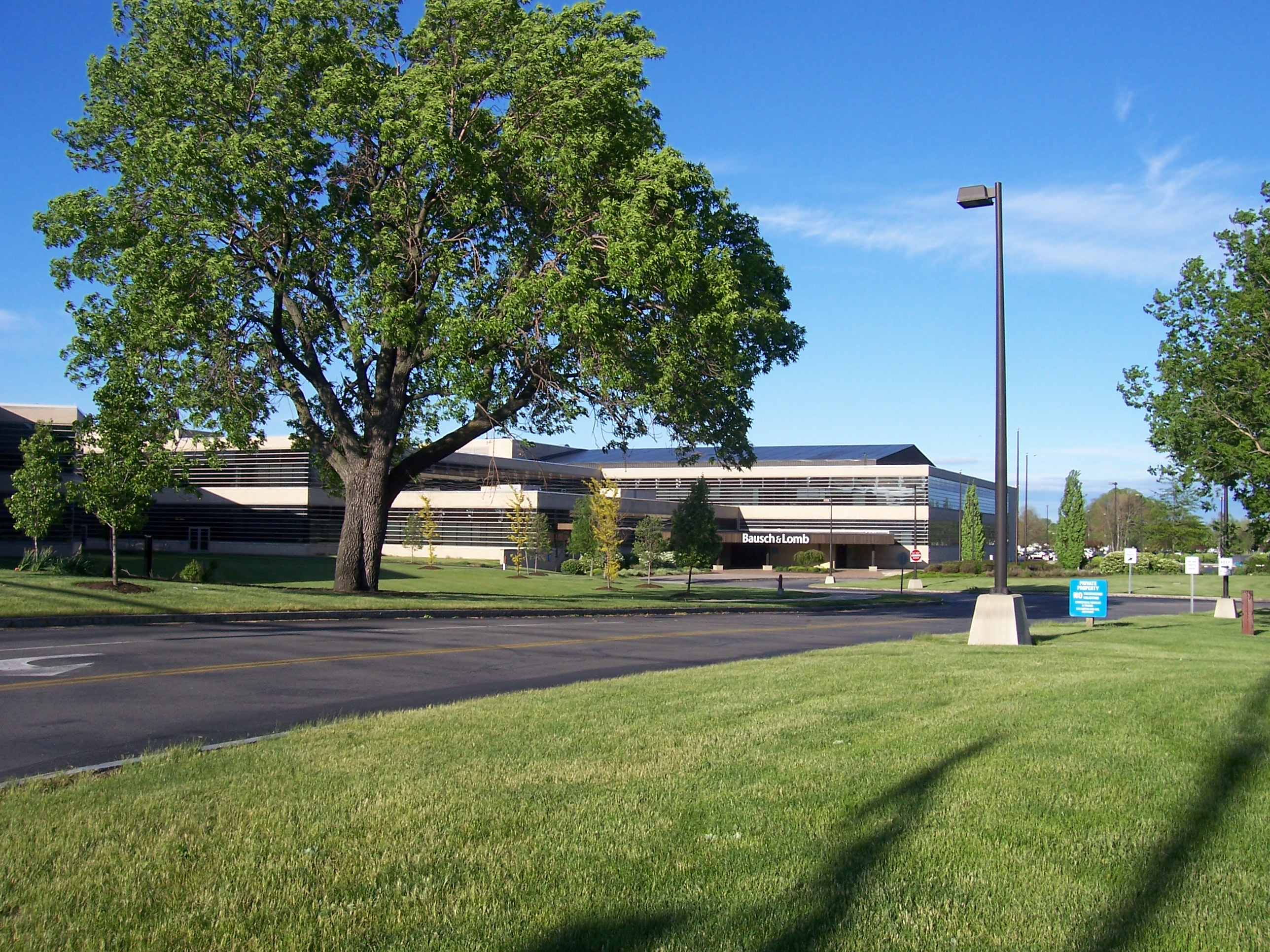
The Global Eye Health Center in Rochester, New York

Vision care made $656 million during the first quarter of 2025, with revenue mainly coming from Daily SiHy lenses, Bausch + Lomb ULTRA®, over-the-counter dry eye products, LUMIFY, and eye vitamins.

On July 2, 2004, the company announced that it had licensed the intellectual property of Novartis.

== Lawsuits ==
In 1994, several states in the US, including Texas, opened an investigation against Bausch & Lomb. This investigation was based on the sale of duplicate contact lenses under different names and prices. Three different versions of the same contact lens were being sold under OptimaFW, Medalist lenses, and SeeQuence2. OptimaFW, the most expensive version, was available with a lifetime of one year, The mid-priced, Medalist lenses were sold with a lifetime of three months, and SeeQuence2, the least expensive, came with a lifetime of two to three weeks. By 1996, the company ensured that all three versions carried the OptimaFW tag and tried to standardize the packaging, but the pricing was still different. In 1996, the case was settled for $68 million. In 1997, 17 states pressured Bausch & Lomb to stop the sale of duplicate lenses, deceptive practice stated in the court. The settlement also demanded the company to pay $1.7 million or $100,000 to each state to cover investigative costs.

In 2009, Bausch & Lomb spent $250 million to settle six hundred lawsuits filed by consumers exposed to Fusarium keratitis, a fungal infection, after using its contact solution ReNu with MoistureLoc. Between June 2005 and September 2006, one hundred eighty cases were reported, out of which seven patients required eye removal and sixty required corneal transplants.

Bausch + Lomb was involved in a lawsuit with Novartis, which claimed to have patents on a Bausch + Lomb product called PureVision. On June 26, 2002, a federal judge ruled that Bausch & Lomb did infringe on Ciba Vision (a subsidiary of Alcon) patents.

=== ReNu product recalls ===
On April 11, 2006, Bausch & Lomb stopped shipments of its ReNu with MoistureLoc contact lens solution when the Centers for Disease Control and Prevention (CDC) announced there was a high correlation between use of the product and cases of suspected fungal keratitis. The Centers for Disease Control found that "nearly all of the company's ReNu with MoistureLoc eye care products were linked to severe fungal eye infections". Two class action lawsuits were filed against Bausch & Lomb in relation to the eye fungus problems.

== Reception ==
In 2003, Bausch & Lomb received a 100% rating on the Corporate Equality Index released by the Human Rights Campaign.
