= Zinka (given name) =

Zinka is a feminine given name. Notable people with the name include:

- Zinka Milanov, Croatian operatic soprano
- Zinka Zorko, Slovenian linguist
