= OD600 =

Optical density of a sample measured at 600 nm

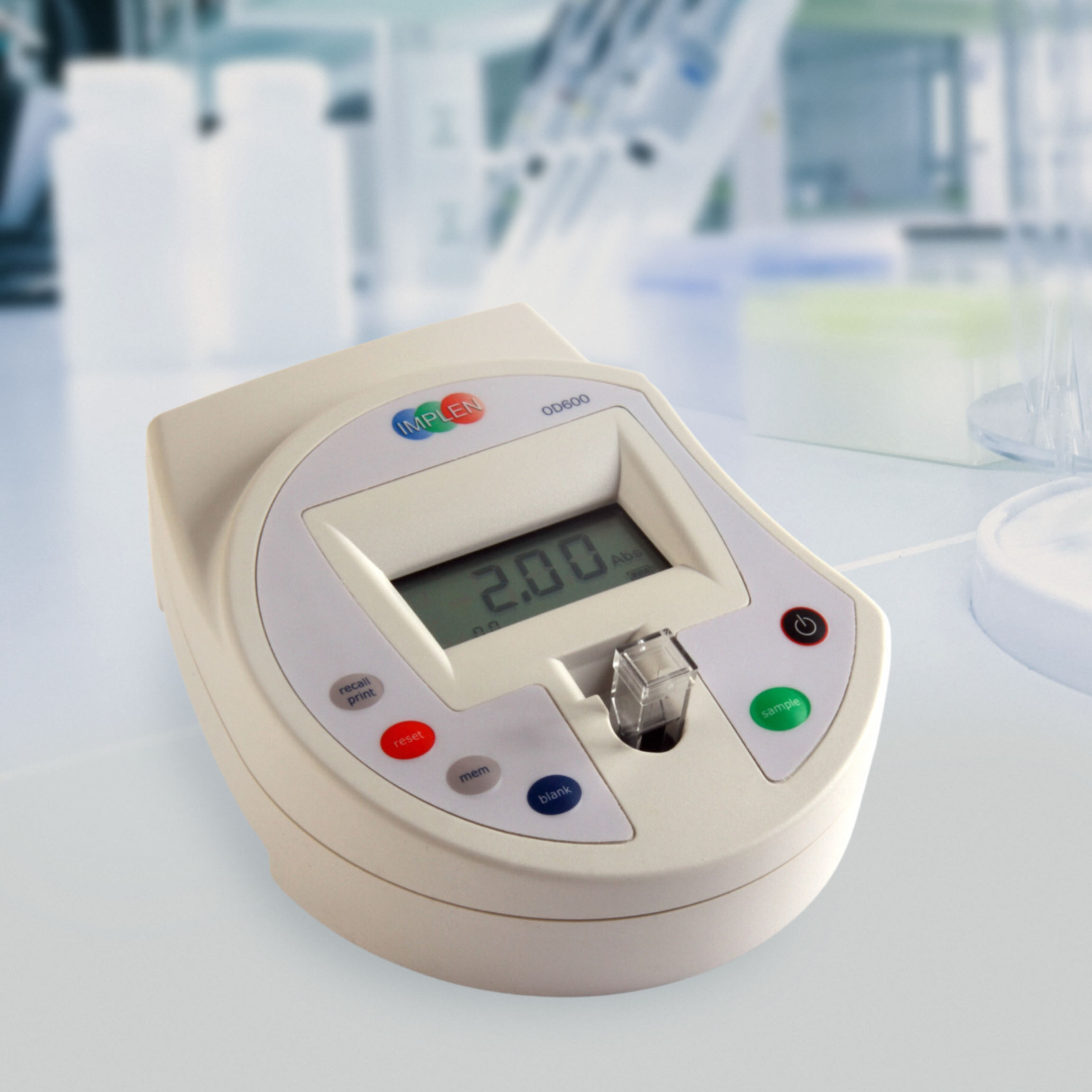
Spectrophotometer for OD600 and Cell Density Measurements

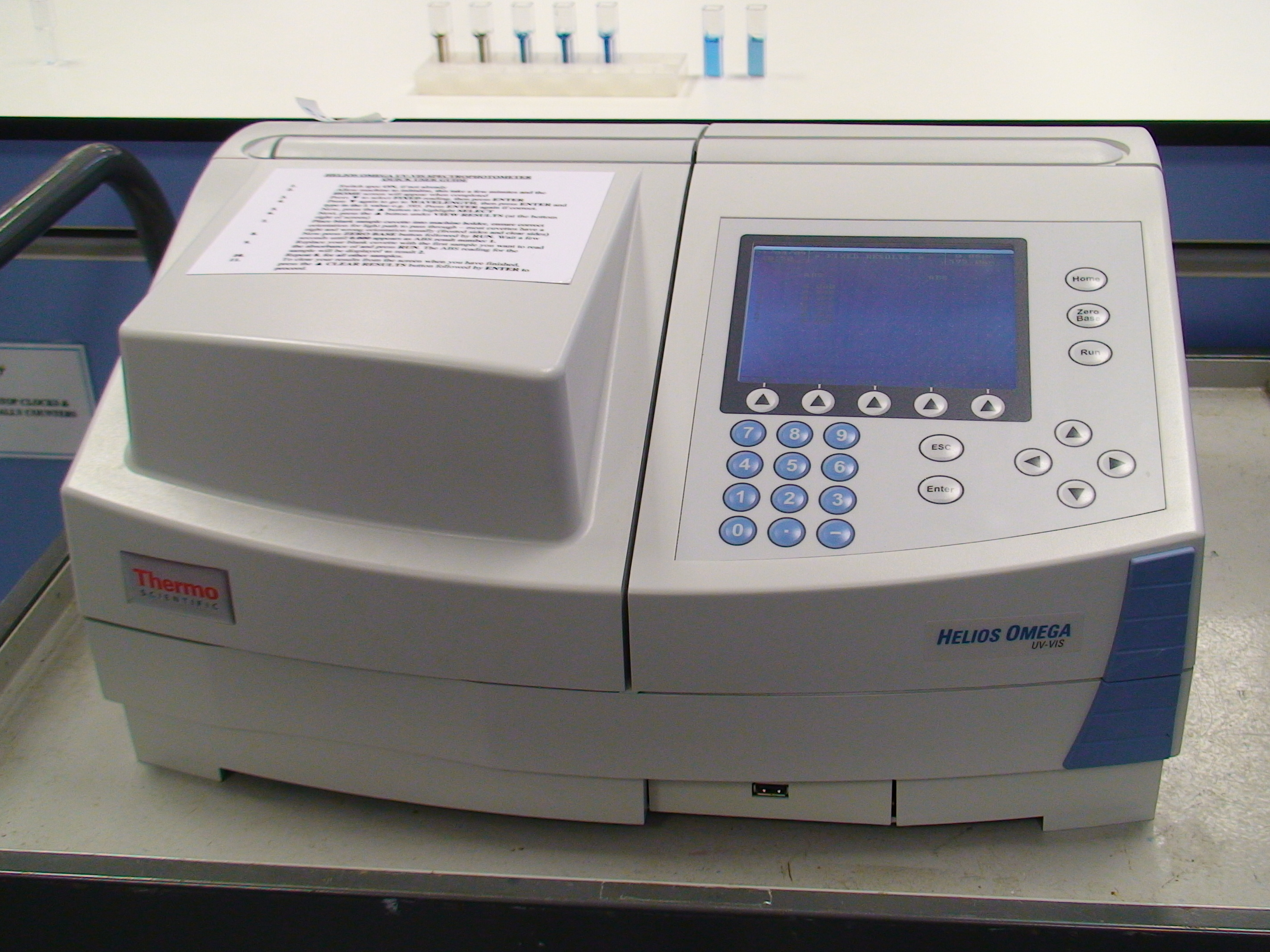

OD600 (Also written as O.D. 600, D_{600}, o.d. 600, OD_{600}) is an abbreviation indicating the optical density of a sample measured at a wavelength of 600 nm in 1 cm light path (unless otherwise stated). It is a commonly used in microbiology for estimating the concentration of bacteria or other cells in a liquid as the 600 nm wavelength does little to damage or hinder their growth. OD_{600} is a type of turbidity measurement. Since optical density in case of OD_{600} measurements results from light scattering by particles (cells) rather than absorption, size and shape as well as dead cells and debris of a cell may add to light dissipating. Distinctive cell types that are at densities of the same level (eg. cell/mL), may, therefore, show varying values OD_{600}, when estimated on a similar instrument.

For turbid samples such as cell cultures, the major contributor for the optical density measured is light scattering and not the result of molecular absorption following the Beer-Lambert Law. The measurements are therefore depending on the optical setup of the spectrophotometer (distance between the cell holder and instrument exit slit, monochromator optics, slit geometry, etc.), different instrument types will most likely tend to give different OD_{600} readings for the same turbid sample.

Measuring the change of the OD_{600} as a function of time (e.g. measuring of the growth curve) may indicate the growth phase of cultured cell population, i.e. whether it is in the lag phase, log phase, or stationary phase. For protein expression and purification in bacteria it is recommended that protein induction and cell harvesting should be done at specific OD_{600} (usually at the end of the log phase, OD_{600}= 0.4).

OD_{600} is preferable to UV spectroscopy when measuring the growth over time of a cell population because at this wavelength, the cells will not be killed as they would under too much UV radiation. UV radiation has also been shown to cause small to medium-sized mutations in bacteria, potentially altering or destroying genes of interest.
