= Schering-Plough =

Pharmaceutical company

Schering-Plough Corporation
- Type: Subsidiary
- Industry: Pharmaceuticals
- Founded: 1971 (by merger with Plough, Inc.)
- Defunct: November 2009; 16 years ago
- Fate: Merged with Merck & Co.
- Headquarters: Rahway, New Jersey
- Key people: Fred Hassan; Final CEO & Chairman
- Revenue: US$18.502 billion (2008)
- Net income: US$1.903 billion (2008)
- Parent: Merck & Co.

Schering-Plough Corporation was an American pharmaceutical company. It was originally the U.S. subsidiary of the German company Schering AG, which was founded in 1851 by Ernst Christian Friedrich Schering. As a result of nationalization, it became an independent company. In 1971, the Schering Corporation merged with Plough, Inc. (founded by Memphis-based entrepreneur Abe Plough in 1908) to form Schering-Plough. On November 4, 2009 Merck & Co. merged with Schering-Plough with the new company taking the name of Merck & Co.

Schering-Plough manufactured several pharmaceutical drugs, the most well-known of which were the allergy drugs Claritin and Clarinex, an anti-cholesterol drug Vytorin, and a brain tumor drug Temodar. These are now available from Merck & Co.

Schering-Plough also owned and operated the major foot care brand name Dr. Scholl's and the skin care line Coppertone. These also became a part of the new company.

As of June 2005, Schering-Plough had 1.4% market share in the U.S., placing it seventeenth in the top twenty pharmaceutical corporations by sales compiled by IMS Health.

Schering-Plough was a full member of the European Federation of Pharmaceutical Industries and Associations (EFPIA), a membership which is also maintained by the new Merck & Co.

== History ==
=== Pharmaceuticals and consumer products ===
Schering was founded in 1851 by Ernst Christian Friedrich Schering as Schering AG in Germany.

Plough, Incorporated was founded by the Memphis, Tennessee area entrepreneur Abe Plough (1892–1984) in 1908. He borrowed $125 from his father to start the business at age sixteen. As a one-man business, he mixed "Plough's Antiseptic Healing Oil," a "sure cure for any ill of man or beast," and sold it off a horse-drawn buggy.

Plough's acquisitions included St Joseph's Aspirin for children, Maybelline cosmetics, and Coppertone skin care products. Plough also had a broadcasting division, operating radio stations in Atlanta, Georgia (WPLO-AM & FM); Baltimore, Maryland (WCAO-AM & FM); Boston, Massachusetts (WCOP-AM & FM); Chicago, Illinois (WJJD-AM & FM); and Memphis, Tennessee (WMPS-AM & FM).

Following the entry of the United States into World War II in 1941, U.S. President Franklin Delano Roosevelt ordered Schering AG's U.S. assets be seized. These became the Schering Corporation. The company was placed under a government administratorship until 1952, when it was released, and its assets sold to the private sector.

In 1957, Schering acquired White Laboratories.

In 1971, the Schering Corporation merged with Plough, Inc. At the time of the merger, Abe Plough became Chairman of the combined company. In 2000, Schering-Plough bought a new campus in Summit, New Jersey from Novartis.

On March 12, 2007, Schering-Plough Corp. purchased Organon BioSciences, the drug unit of Netherlands-based Akzo Nobel, for $14.4 billion, giving the US pharmaceutical company an array of women's health products and numerous late-stage pipelines of experimental medicines. Organon itself was founded in 1923 by Dr. Saal van Zwanenberg, the president of Zwanenberg's Slachterijen en Fabrieken.

On November 4, 2009 Schering-Plough merged with Merck & Co. and through a reverse merger, Merck became a subsidiary of Schering-Plough, which renamed itself Merck.

=== Animal health ===
==== Coopers Animal Health ====
One of Schering-Plough's plants, in Upper Hutt, New Zealand was the largest single site for the production of veterinary vaccines in the world. This was primarily because New Zealand's isolation has formed a natural quarantine, leaving the country free of rabies, foot and mouth, scrapie, bovine spongiform encephalopathy, and many other livestock diseases. It formerly had echinococcosis, but this has been eradicated. The site was known locally as Coopers Animal Health, a trademark which originated in the 1850s with a British company, Cooper & Nephews; the Coopers brand name was still in use by Schering-Plough in Australia, but not elsewhere.

==== Intervet ====
As a result of the acquisition of Organon BioSciences, Schering-Plough bolstered its animal health business with the Akzo Nobel subsidiary Intervet, obtained control of the active pharmaceutical ingredient manufacturer, Diosynth and gained access to human vaccine production through the subsidiary Nobilon. The three companies comprising Organon BioSciences were Organon, Diosynth, and Intervet. HomeAgain continues to use the Intervet name owned by Merck.

==== Merck Animal Health, MSD Animal Health ====
After the merger of Schering-Plough with Merck the animal health division was still known as Intervet/Schering-Plough Animal Health. A merger of Merial and Intervet/Schering-Plough was planned in 2010 but was abandoned in March 2011. On June 29, 2011, the company announced that the animal health division would now be known as Merck Animal Health in the United States and Canada; it is now called MSD Animal Health elsewhere in the world.

=== Chief executives ===
Name	Tenure
Willibald H. Conzen	1971 – 1979
Richard J. Bennett	1979 – January 31, 1982
Robert P. Luciano	February 1, 1982 – December 31, 1995
Richard J. Kogan	January 1, 1996 – April 2003
Fred Hassan	April 2003 – November 3, 2009

== Medical products ==
=== Prescription products ===
- Bridion (sugammadex)
- Cerazette
- Desloratadine: antihistamine branded Clarinex
- Esmeron/Zemuron (rocuronium)
- Famvir (Famciclovir): for Shingles (herpes zoster) treatment, developed by Novartis
- Intron A & PEG-Intron Interferon alfa-2b: for treatment of hepatitis C
- Levitra (vardenafil): Erectile-dysfunction drug; co-marketed with Bayer, and GlaxoSmithKline
- Livial (tibolone)
- Marvelon/Desogen
- Nasonex and Asmanex (Mometasone furoate)
- Noxafil (posaconazole)
- NuvaRing
- Puregon/Follistim
- Quazepam (Doral)
- Remeron/Remeron SolTab (mirtazapine)
- Remicade (infliximab)
- Suboxone (Buprenorphine/Naloxone)
- Temodar (temozolomide)
- Vytorin (ezetimibe/simvastatin): Cholesterol-lowering combination drug
- Zetia (ezetimibe): Cholesterol-lowering drug

=== Over-the-counter products (Most products sold to Bayer, except Coppertone) ===
- Afrin: A nasal spray decongestant
- Claritin (loratadine): An antihistamine which has less risk of causing drowsiness
- Correctol: A stimulant laxative incorporating dioctyl sodium sulfosuccinate and yellow phenolphthalein
- Coricidin: A palliative remedy for the common cold, targeted towards individuals with high blood pressure
- Coppertone: sunscreens
- Bain de Soleil: sunscreen
- Drixoral
- Solarcaine: Sunburn relief
- Zinka: Colored sunscreen

== Veterinary products ==
- Home Again Pet Recovery System: HomeAgain is an advanced pet identification and retrieval system.
- Zubrin: A non-steroidal anti-inflammatory drug (NSAID) for the treatment of osteoarthritis in dogs.
- Mometamax: Is indicated for the treatment of canine acute externa and chronic otitis externa associated with yeast (Malassezia pachydermatis, formerly Pityrosporum canis) and/or bacteria susceptible to gentamicin. It contains the strongest steroid (Mometasone furoate) in Veterinary Medicine.
- Eclipse Vaccines: Attenuated modified live feline vaccines available in a multitude of antigen combinations.
- Galaxy Vaccines: Canine vaccines available in a multitude of antigen combinations.
- Optimmune: Ophthalmic ointment (ciclosporin) for the treatment of Pannis and Keratoconjunctivitis sicca in dogs.
- Orbax: Trade name for orbifloxacin, a fluoroquinolone.
- Otomax: Is indicated for the treatment of canine acute otitis externa and chronic otitis externa associated with yeast (Malassezia pachydermatis, formerly Pityrosporum canis) and/or bacteria susceptible to gentamicin. It contains betamethasone valerate as an anti-inflammatory.
- Banamine: A non-steroidal anti-inflammatory drug (NSAID) used in horses, cattle and swine in different parts of the world.
- Estrumate: A synthetic prostaglandin used in reproduction of cattle.
- Trivetrin: Trimethoprin sulfate for the treatment of cattle and swine.
- Nuflor-Florfenicol-for treatment of bovine respiratory disease, foot rot and control of respiratory disease in cattle at high risk of developing bovine respiratory disease.

== Exercise drug ==
Schering-Plough also received much publicity for a drug AICAR which mimics the effects of exercise, having especially potent effects when used alongside another drug GW1516 developed by GlaxoSmithKline.

== Collaborative research ==
In addition to internal research and development activities Schering-Plough was also involved in publicly funded collaborative research projects, with other industrial and academic partners. One example in non-clinical safety assessment was the InnoMed PredTox.

== Controversy ==
In 2004, Schering-Plough was accused of marketing gimmicks and payoffs to doctors for prescribing the company's pharmaceutical products.

Schering-Plough entered a consent decree with the FDA on March 6, 2002 due to manufacturing issues with its albuterol inhaler. It was ordered to pay $500 million US dollars to the US Treasury.
