= Coppertone (sunscreen) =

Brand of American sunscreen

- Product type: Sunscreen
- Current owner: Beiersdorf
- Country: U.S.
- Introduced: 1944
- Previous owners: Bayer; Merck & Co., Inc. Schering-Plough
- Registered as a trademark in: U.S., Canada
- Tagline: "Tan, don't burn"
- Website: coppertone.com

Coppertone is the brand name for an American sunscreen. Coppertone uses various branding, including the Coppertone girl logo and a distinctive fragrance.

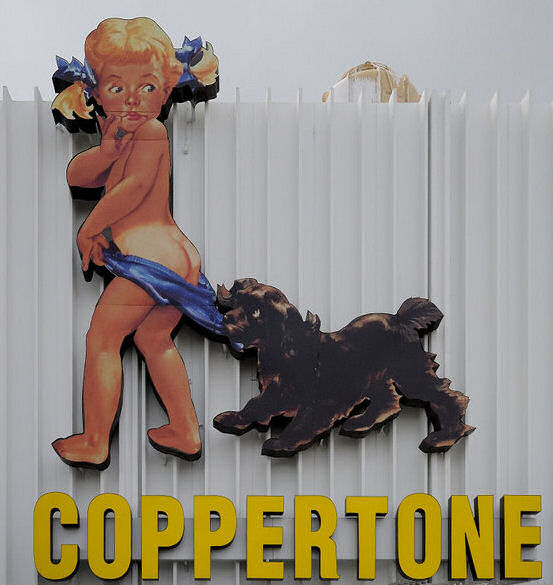
One of the few remaining ads in existence, on the side of a building in Miami

== Product line ==
The original product dates to 1944, when pharmacist Benjamin Green invented a lotion to darken tans. The product line has been expanded to include many skin care products, predominantly sunscreens. Coppertone has become the leading sun care brand in the United States, with annual $9 billion in global sales.

== Branding ==
=== Coppertone name ===
The name Coppertone originated from its marketing of suntan lotion, as opposed to sunscreen.

=== Coppertone girl ===
In the time when the product was a suntan lotion, the company introduced the character the Coppertone girl, also known as Little Miss Coppertone. In the advertisement, a young blond girl in pigtails stares in surprise as a Cocker Spaniel puppy tugs at her swimsuit, revealing her tan line.

==== Logo history ====
The original Coppertone logo was the profile of an American Indian chief. In 1953, Tally Embry Advertising in Florida was hired, and their ad men created the concept of the little girl and the pup. An artist named Joyce Ballantyne Brand re-drew the little girl in 1959 when the original artwork was destroyed in a fire. She was then working for Grant Advertising in New York.

==== Coppertone sign ====
A series of mechanical billboards were constructed across the United States, whereon the motorized dog and swimsuit bottoms rocked up and down perpetually. Although most of them are long since gone or have stopped moving, one such billboard of the then Coppertone Girl still stands in Miami Beach — dog, pigtails, swimsuit, bottom, and all.

==== Live models ====
When Joyce Ballantyne Brand redrew the logo in 1959, she purportedly used her daughter, Cheri, as her model, and her drawing closely resembled the original artwork.

=== Fragrances ===
Many Coppertone products share a distinctive fragrance. Chandler Burr described it as "arguably the single greatest work of scent branding ever". A researcher on human memory used it as an example of an odor that evokes autobiographical memories. Besides for the classic fragrance, the Coppertone product line has expanded to include other scents.

An early slogan for Coppertone was, "Tan, don't burn".

== Ownership ==
- 1944 Benjamin Green develops a suntan lotion
- 1957 Plough acquires Coppertone
- 1971 Schering Corporation merges with Plough to form Schering-Plough
- 2009 Merck & Co. acquires Schering-Plough
- 2014 Bayer acquires Merck & Co.'s consumer business, including Coppertone
- 2019 Beiersdorf AG announces agreement to acquire Coppertone from Bayer. According to Beiersdorf's president, the purchase will strengthen the company's presence in the USA market. Beiersdorf already owns Nivea, whose Nivea Sun is a leading sunscreen in Europe.

== Competitors ==
Circa 2018, competing brands included Neutrogena and Banana Boat.
