= List of MeSH codes (C01) =

The following is a partial list of the "C" codes for Medical Subject Headings (MeSH), as defined by the United States National Library of Medicine (NLM).

This list continues the information at List of MeSH codes (B08). Codes following these are found at List of MeSH codes (C02). For other MeSH codes, see List of MeSH codes.

The source for this content is the set of 2020 MeSH Trees from the NLM.

== MeSH C01 – Infections ==
=== MeSH C01.100 Arthritis, Infectious ===
MeSH C01.100.500 Arthritis, Reactive

=== MeSH C01.150 Bacterial Infections and Mycoses ===
- MeSH C01.150.252 Bacterial Infections
- MeSH C01.150.703 Mycoses

=== MeSH C01.160 Bone Diseases, Infectious ===
- MeSH C01.160.495 Osteomyelitis
  - MeSH C01.160.495.500 Mastoiditis
  - MeSH C01.160.495.750 Petrositis
  - MeSH C01.160.495.875 Pott Puffy Tumor
- MeSH C01.160.595 Periostitis
- MeSH C01.160.762 Spondylitis
  - MeSH C01.762.301 Discitis
- MeSH C01.160.886 Tuberculosis, Osteoarticular
  - MeSH C01.160.886.722 Tuberculosis, Spinal

=== MeSH C01.190 Cardiovascular Infections ===
- MeSH C01.190.249 Endocarditis, Bacterial
  - MeSH C01.190.249.407 Endocarditis, Subacute Bacterial
- MeSH C01.190.500 Syphilis, Cardiovascular
- MeSH C01.190.750 Tuberculosis, Cardiovascular
  - MeSH C01.190.7500.595 Pericarditis, Tuberculosis

=== MeSH C01.207 Central Nervous System Infections ===
- MeSH C01.207.090 Brain Abscess
  - MeSH C01.207.090.800 Toxoplasmosis, Cerebral

==== MeSH C01.252.100 – bacteremia ====
- MeSH C01.252.100.375 – hemorrhagic septicemia

==== MeSH C01.252.200 – central nervous system bacterial infections ====
- MeSH C01.252.200.100 – brain abscess
- MeSH C01.252.200.200 – empyema, subdural
- MeSH C01.252.200.250 – epidural abscess
- MeSH C01.252.200.450 – lyme neuroborreliosis
- MeSH C01.252.200.500 – meningitis, bacterial
- MeSH C01.252.200.500.400 – meningitis, escherichia coli
- MeSH C01.252.200.500.450 – meningitis, haemophilus
- MeSH C01.252.200.500.500 – meningitis, listeria
- MeSH C01.252.200.500.550 – meningitis, meningococcal
- MeSH C01.252.200.500.550.800 – waterhouse-friderichsen syndrome
- MeSH C01.252.200.500.600 – meningitis, pneumococcal
- MeSH C01.252.200.500.800 – tuberculosis, meningeal
- MeSH C01.252.200.750 – neurosyphilis

==== MeSH C01.252.300 – endocarditis, bacterial ====
- MeSH C01.252.300.407 – endocarditis, subacute bacterial

==== MeSH C01.252.354 – eye infections, bacterial ====
- MeSH C01.252.354.225 – conjunctivitis, bacterial
- MeSH C01.252.354.225.250 – conjunctivitis, inclusion
- MeSH C01.252.354.225.625 – ophthalmia neonatorum
- MeSH C01.252.354.225.800 – trachoma
- MeSH C01.252.354.400 – hordeolum
- MeSH C01.252.354.450 – keratoconjunctivitis, infectious
- MeSH C01.252.354.800 – tuberculosis, ocular
- MeSH C01.252.354.900 – uveitis, suppurative
- MeSH C01.252.354.900.350 – endophthalmitis
- MeSH C01.252.354.900.675 – panophthalmitis

==== MeSH C01.252.400 – gram-negative bacterial infections ====
- MeSH C01.252.400.054 – anaplasmataceae infections
- MeSH C01.252.400.054.050 – anaplasmosis
- MeSH C01.252.400.054.160 – ehrlichiosis
- MeSH C01.252.400.054.160.400 – heartwater disease
- MeSH C01.252.400.110 – bacteroidaceae infections
- MeSH C01.252.400.110.109 – bacteroides infections
- MeSH C01.252.400.126 – bartonellaceae infections
- MeSH C01.252.400.126.100 – bartonella infections
- MeSH C01.252.400.126.100.050 – angiomatosis, bacillary
- MeSH C01.252.400.126.100.150 – cat-scratch disease
- MeSH C01.252.400.126.100.800 – trench fever
- MeSH C01.252.400.143 – bordetella infections
- MeSH C01.252.400.143.740 – whooping cough
- MeSH C01.252.400.155 – borrelia infections
- MeSH C01.252.400.155.569 – lyme disease
- MeSH C01.252.400.155.569.200 – erythema chronicum migrans
- MeSH C01.252.400.155.569.600 – lyme neuroborreliosis
- MeSH C01.252.400.155.644 – relapsing fever
- MeSH C01.252.400.167 – brucellosis
- MeSH C01.252.400.167.322 – brucellosis, bovine
- MeSH C01.252.400.170 – burkholderia infections
- MeSH C01.252.400.170.400 – glanders
- MeSH C01.252.400.170.531 – melioidosis
- MeSH C01.252.400.177 – campylobacter infections
- MeSH C01.252.400.200 – cat-scratch disease
- MeSH C01.252.400.210 – chlamydiaceae infections
- MeSH C01.252.400.210.210 – chlamydia infections
- MeSH C01.252.400.210.210.250 – conjunctivitis, inclusion
- MeSH C01.252.400.210.210.490 – lymphogranuloma venereum
- MeSH C01.252.400.210.210.800 – trachoma
- MeSH C01.252.400.210.250 – chlamydophila infections
- MeSH C01.252.400.210.250.600 – psittacosis
- MeSH C01.252.400.260 – desulfovibrionaceae infections
- MeSH C01.252.400.310 – enterobacteriaceae infections
- MeSH C01.252.400.310.229 – dysentery, bacillary
- MeSH C01.252.400.310.330 – escherichia coli infections
- MeSH C01.252.400.310.330.500 – meningitis, escherichia coli
- MeSH C01.252.400.310.416 – granuloma inguinale
- MeSH C01.252.400.310.503 – klebsiella infections
- MeSH C01.252.400.310.503.650 – rhinoscleroma
- MeSH C01.252.400.310.708 – proteus infections
- MeSH C01.252.400.310.821 – salmonella infections
- MeSH C01.252.400.310.821.438 – paratyphoid fever
- MeSH C01.252.400.310.821.606 – salmonella food poisoning
- MeSH C01.252.400.310.821.706 – salmonella infections, animal
- MeSH C01.252.400.310.821.873 – typhoid fever
- MeSH C01.252.400.310.850 – serratia infections
- MeSH C01.252.400.310.980 – yersinia infections
- MeSH C01.252.400.310.980.745 – plague
- MeSH C01.252.400.310.980.780 – yersinia pseudotuberculosis infections
- MeSH C01.252.400.349 – flavobacteriaceae infections
- MeSH C01.252.400.368 – flexibacteraceae infections
- MeSH C01.252.400.388 – fusobacteriaceae infections
- MeSH C01.252.400.388.350 – fusobacterium infections
- MeSH C01.252.400.388.350.400 – gingivitis, necrotizing ulcerative
- MeSH C01.252.400.388.750 – rat-bite fever
- MeSH C01.252.400.466 – helicobacter infections
- MeSH C01.252.400.500 – legionellosis
- MeSH C01.252.400.500.501 – legionnaires' disease
- MeSH C01.252.400.511 – leptospirosis
- MeSH C01.252.400.511.739 – weil disease
- MeSH C01.252.400.560 – moraxellaceae infections
- MeSH C01.252.400.560.022 – acinetobacter infections
- MeSH C01.252.400.610 – mycoplasmatales infections
- MeSH C01.252.400.610.610 – mycoplasma infections
- MeSH C01.252.400.610.610.717 – pleuropneumonia, contagious
- MeSH C01.252.400.610.610.760 – pneumonia, mycoplasma
- MeSH C01.252.400.610.850 – ureaplasma infections
- MeSH C01.252.400.625 – neisseriaceae infections
- MeSH C01.252.400.625.391 – gonorrhea
- MeSH C01.252.400.625.391.658 – ophthalmia neonatorum
- MeSH C01.252.400.625.549 – meningococcal infections
- MeSH C01.252.400.625.549.449 – meningitis, meningococcal
- MeSH C01.252.400.625.549.449.800 – waterhouse-friderichsen syndrome
- MeSH C01.252.400.700 – pasteurellaceae infections
- MeSH C01.252.400.700.030 – actinobacillus infections
- MeSH C01.252.400.700.030.178 – actinobacillosis
- MeSH C01.252.400.700.433 – haemophilus infections
- MeSH C01.252.400.700.433.257 – chancroid
- MeSH C01.252.400.700.433.615 – meningitis, haemophilus
- MeSH C01.252.400.700.662 – pasteurella infections
- MeSH C01.252.400.700.662.297 – hemorrhagic septicemia
- MeSH C01.252.400.700.675 – pasteurellosis, pneumonic
- MeSH C01.252.400.719 – piscirickettsiaceae infections
- MeSH C01.252.400.739 – pseudomonas infections
- MeSH C01.252.400.755 – q fever
- MeSH C01.252.400.771 – rat-bite fever
- MeSH C01.252.400.780 – rickettsiaceae infections
- MeSH C01.252.400.780.600 – pneumonia, rickettsial
- MeSH C01.252.400.780.790 – rickettsia infections
- MeSH C01.252.400.780.790.125 – boutonneuse fever
- MeSH C01.252.400.780.790.700 – rocky mountain spotted fever
- MeSH C01.252.400.780.790.800 – typhus, endemic flea-borne
- MeSH C01.252.400.780.790.805 – typhus, epidemic louse-borne
- MeSH C01.252.400.780.850 – scrub typhus
- MeSH C01.252.400.825 – tick-borne diseases
- MeSH C01.252.400.825.050 – anaplasmosis
- MeSH C01.252.400.825.125 – boutonneuse fever
- MeSH C01.252.400.825.200 – ehrlichiosis
- MeSH C01.252.400.825.300 – heartwater disease
- MeSH C01.252.400.825.480 – lyme disease
- MeSH C01.252.400.825.480.400 – erythema chronicum migrans
- MeSH C01.252.400.825.480.700 – lyme neuroborreliosis
- MeSH C01.252.400.825.750 – relapsing fever
- MeSH C01.252.400.825.775 – rocky mountain spotted fever
- MeSH C01.252.400.825.900 – tularemia
- MeSH C01.252.400.840 – treponemal infections
- MeSH C01.252.400.840.558 – pinta
- MeSH C01.252.400.840.744 – syphilis
- MeSH C01.252.400.840.744.161 – chancre
- MeSH C01.252.400.840.744.456 – neurosyphilis
- MeSH C01.252.400.840.744.456.778 – tabes dorsalis
- MeSH C01.252.400.840.744.657 – syphilis, cardiovascular
- MeSH C01.252.400.840.744.725 – syphilis, congenital
- MeSH C01.252.400.840.744.800 – syphilis, cutaneous
- MeSH C01.252.400.840.744.871 – syphilis, latent
- MeSH C01.252.400.840.892 – yaws
- MeSH C01.252.400.939 – tularemia
- MeSH C01.252.400.959 – vibrio infections
- MeSH C01.252.400.959.347 – cholera

==== MeSH C01.252.410 – gram-positive bacterial infections ====
- MeSH C01.252.410.040 – actinomycetales infections
- MeSH C01.252.410.040.137 – actinomycosis
- MeSH C01.252.410.040.137.262 – actinomycosis, cervicofacial
- MeSH C01.252.410.040.137.631 – whipple disease
- MeSH C01.252.410.040.246 – corynebacterium infections
- MeSH C01.252.410.040.246.388 – diphtheria
- MeSH C01.252.410.040.246.430 – erythrasma
- MeSH C01.252.410.040.552 – mycobacterium infections
- MeSH C01.252.410.040.552.386 – leprosy
- MeSH C01.252.410.040.552.386.110 – leprosy, borderline
- MeSH C01.252.410.040.552.386.500 – leprosy, lepromatous
- MeSH C01.252.410.040.552.386.700 – leprosy, tuberculoid
- MeSH C01.252.410.040.552.475 – mycobacterium infections, atypical
- MeSH C01.252.410.040.552.475.495 – mycobacterium avium-intracellulare infection
- MeSH C01.252.410.040.552.588 – paratuberculosis
- MeSH C01.252.410.040.552.846 – tuberculosis
- MeSH C01.252.410.040.552.846.246 – peritonitis, tuberculous
- MeSH C01.252.410.040.552.846.493 – tuberculoma
- MeSH C01.252.410.040.552.846.493.400 – tuberculoma, intracranial
- MeSH C01.252.410.040.552.846.516 – tuberculosis, avian
- MeSH C01.252.410.040.552.846.538 – tuberculosis, bovine
- MeSH C01.252.410.040.552.846.561 – tuberculosis, cardiovascular
- MeSH C01.252.410.040.552.846.561.595 – pericarditis, tuberculous
- MeSH C01.252.410.040.552.846.570 – tuberculosis, central nervous system
- MeSH C01.252.410.040.552.846.570.300 – tuberculoma, intracranial
- MeSH C01.252.410.040.552.846.570.600 – tuberculosis, meningeal
- MeSH C01.252.410.040.552.846.583 – tuberculosis, cutaneous
- MeSH C01.252.410.040.552.846.583.260 – erythema induratum
- MeSH C01.252.410.040.552.846.583.470 – lupus
- MeSH C01.252.410.040.552.846.606 – tuberculosis, endocrine
- MeSH C01.252.410.040.552.846.628 – tuberculosis, gastrointestinal
- MeSH C01.252.410.040.552.846.651 – tuberculosis, hepatic
- MeSH C01.252.410.040.552.846.696 – tuberculosis, laryngeal
- MeSH C01.252.410.040.552.846.719 – tuberculosis, lymph node
- MeSH C01.252.410.040.552.846.719.500 – king's evil
- MeSH C01.252.410.040.552.846.764 – tuberculosis, miliary
- MeSH C01.252.410.040.552.846.775 – tuberculosis, multidrug-resistant
- MeSH C01.252.410.040.552.846.786 – tuberculosis, ocular
- MeSH C01.252.410.040.552.846.809 – tuberculosis, oral
- MeSH C01.252.410.040.552.846.831 – tuberculosis, osteoarticular
- MeSH C01.252.410.040.552.846.831.722 – tuberculosis, spinal
- MeSH C01.252.410.040.552.846.877 – tuberculosis, pleural
- MeSH C01.252.410.040.552.846.877.405 – empyema, tuberculous
- MeSH C01.252.410.040.552.846.899 – tuberculosis, pulmonary
- MeSH C01.252.410.040.552.846.899.669 – silicotuberculosis
- MeSH C01.252.410.040.552.846.922 – tuberculosis, splenic
- MeSH C01.252.410.040.552.846.944 – tuberculosis, urogenital
- MeSH C01.252.410.040.552.846.944.596 – tuberculosis, female genital
- MeSH C01.252.410.040.552.846.944.721 – tuberculosis, male genital
- MeSH C01.252.410.040.552.846.944.847 – tuberculosis, renal
- MeSH C01.252.410.040.692 – nocardia infections
- MeSH C01.252.410.040.692.606 – maduromycosis
- MeSH C01.252.410.090 – bacillaceae infections
- MeSH C01.252.410.090.072 – anthrax
- MeSH C01.252.410.110 – bifidobacteriales infections
- MeSH C01.252.410.222 – clostridium infections
- MeSH C01.252.410.222.151 – botulism
- MeSH C01.252.410.222.310 – enterocolitis, pseudomembranous
- MeSH C01.252.410.222.325 – enterotoxemia
- MeSH C01.252.410.222.440 – gas gangrene
- MeSH C01.252.410.222.864 – tetanus
- MeSH C01.252.410.334 – erysipelothrix infections
- MeSH C01.252.410.334.329 – erysipeloid
- MeSH C01.252.410.334.776 – swine erysipelas
- MeSH C01.252.410.514 – listeria infections
- MeSH C01.252.410.514.533 – meningitis, listeria
- MeSH C01.252.410.868 – staphylococcal infections
- MeSH C01.252.410.868.675 – pneumonia, staphylococcal
- MeSH C01.252.410.868.806 – staphylococcal food poisoning
- MeSH C01.252.410.868.820 – staphylococcal skin infections
- MeSH C01.252.410.868.820.270 – furunculosis
- MeSH C01.252.410.868.820.270.200 – carbuncle
- MeSH C01.252.410.868.820.504 – impetigo
- MeSH C01.252.410.868.820.770 – staphylococcal scalded skin syndrome
- MeSH C01.252.410.890 – streptococcal infections
- MeSH C01.252.410.890.210 – ecthyma
- MeSH C01.252.410.890.240 – endocarditis, subacute bacterial
- MeSH C01.252.410.890.328 – erysipelas
- MeSH C01.252.410.890.350 – fasciitis, necrotizing
- MeSH C01.252.410.890.485 – impetigo
- MeSH C01.252.410.890.670 – pneumococcal infections
- MeSH C01.252.410.890.670.595 – meningitis, pneumococcal
- MeSH C01.252.410.890.670.750 – pneumonia, pneumococcal
- MeSH C01.252.410.890.731 – rheumatic fever
- MeSH C01.252.410.890.731.649 – rheumatic heart disease
- MeSH C01.252.410.890.823 – scarlet fever

==== MeSH C01.252.620 – pneumonia, bacterial ====
- MeSH C01.252.620.500 – pneumonia, mycoplasma
- MeSH C01.252.620.530 – pneumonia of calves, enzootic
- MeSH C01.252.620.540 – pneumonia of swine, mycoplasmal
- MeSH C01.252.620.550 – pneumonia, pneumococcal
- MeSH C01.252.620.600 – pneumonia, rickettsial
- MeSH C01.252.620.620 – pneumonia, staphylococcal

==== MeSH C01.252.810 – sexually transmitted diseases, bacterial ====
- MeSH C01.252.810.201 – chancroid
- MeSH C01.252.810.301 – chlamydia infections
- MeSH C01.252.810.301.490 – lymphogranuloma venereum
- MeSH C01.252.810.401 – gonorrhea
- MeSH C01.252.810.451 – granuloma inguinale
- MeSH C01.252.810.859 – syphilis

==== MeSH C01.252.825 – skin diseases, bacterial ====
- MeSH C01.252.825.110 – actinomycosis, cervicofacial
- MeSH C01.252.825.150 – angiomatosis, bacillary
- MeSH C01.252.825.210 – ecthyma
- MeSH C01.252.825.260 – erysipelas
- MeSH C01.252.825.310 – erythema chronicum migrans
- MeSH C01.252.825.320 – erythrasma
- MeSH C01.252.825.360 – granuloma inguinale
- MeSH C01.252.825.420 – hidradenitis suppurativa
- MeSH C01.252.825.557 – maduromycosis
- MeSH C01.252.825.630 – pinta
- MeSH C01.252.825.705 – rhinoscleroma
- MeSH C01.252.825.770 – staphylococcal skin infections
- MeSH C01.252.825.770.270 – furunculosis
- MeSH C01.252.825.770.270.200 – carbuncle
- MeSH C01.252.825.770.360 – impetigo
- MeSH C01.252.825.770.770 – staphylococcal scalded skin syndrome
- MeSH C01.252.825.790 – syphilis, cutaneous
- MeSH C01.252.825.820 – tuberculosis, cutaneous
- MeSH C01.252.825.820.260 – erythema induratum
- MeSH C01.252.825.820.470 – lupus
- MeSH C01.252.825.910 – yaws

==== MeSH C01.252.847 – spirochaetales infections ====
- MeSH C01.252.847.193 – borrelia infections
- MeSH C01.252.847.193.569 – lyme disease
- MeSH C01.252.847.193.569.200 – erythema chronicum migrans
- MeSH C01.252.847.193.569.600 – lyme neuroborreliosis
- MeSH C01.252.847.193.644 – relapsing fever
- MeSH C01.252.847.511 – leptospirosis
- MeSH C01.252.847.511.739 – weil disease
- MeSH C01.252.847.840 – treponemal infections
- MeSH C01.252.847.840.558 – pinta
- MeSH C01.252.847.840.744 – syphilis
- MeSH C01.252.847.840.744.161 – chancre
- MeSH C01.252.847.840.744.456 – neurosyphilis
- MeSH C01.252.847.840.744.456.778 – tabes dorsalis
- MeSH C01.252.847.840.744.657 – syphilis, cardiovascular
- MeSH C01.252.847.840.744.725 – syphilis, congenital
- MeSH C01.252.847.840.744.800 – syphilis, cutaneous
- MeSH C01.252.847.840.744.871 – syphilis, latent
- MeSH C01.252.847.840.892 – yaws

=== MeSH C01.539 – infection ===
==== MeSH C01.539.100 – arthritis, infectious ====
- MeSH C01.539.100.500 – arthritis, reactive

==== MeSH C01.539.160 – bone diseases, infectious ====
- MeSH C01.539.160.412 – osteitis
- MeSH C01.539.160.495 – osteomyelitis
- MeSH C01.539.160.595 – periostitis
- MeSH C01.539.160.762 – spondylitis
- MeSH C01.539.160.762.301 – discitis
- MeSH C01.539.160.886 – tuberculosis, osteoarticular
- MeSH C01.539.160.886.722 – tuberculosis, spinal

==== MeSH C01.539.221 – communicable diseases ====
- MeSH C01.539.221.500 – communicable diseases, emerging

==== MeSH C01.539.375 – eye infections ====
- MeSH C01.539.375.177 – corneal ulcer
- MeSH C01.539.375.354 – eye infections, bacterial
- MeSH C01.539.375.354.220 – conjunctivitis, bacterial
- MeSH C01.539.375.354.220.250 – conjunctivitis, inclusion
- MeSH C01.539.375.354.220.625 – ophthalmia neonatorum
- MeSH C01.539.375.354.220.800 – trachoma
- MeSH C01.539.375.354.400 – hordeolum
- MeSH C01.539.375.354.450 – keratoconjunctivitis, infectious
- MeSH C01.539.375.354.800 – tuberculosis, ocular
- MeSH C01.539.375.354.900 – uveitis, suppurative
- MeSH C01.539.375.354.900.350 – endophthalmitis
- MeSH C01.539.375.354.900.675 – panophthalmitis
- MeSH C01.539.375.450 – eye infections, fungal
- MeSH C01.539.375.450.900 – uveitis, suppurative
- MeSH C01.539.375.450.900.350 – endophthalmitis
- MeSH C01.539.375.450.900.675 – panophthalmitis

==== MeSH C01.539.392 – focal infection ====
- MeSH C01.539.392.433 – focal infection, dental

==== MeSH C01.539.597 – opportunistic infections ====
- MeSH C01.539.597.050 – aids-related opportunistic infections
- MeSH C01.539.597.880 – superinfection

==== MeSH C01.539.635 – pelvic infection ====
- MeSH C01.539.635.500 – pelvic inflammatory disease

==== MeSH C01.539.674 – pregnancy complications, infectious ====
- MeSH C01.539.674.173 – abortion, septic
- MeSH C01.539.674.715 – puerperal infection

==== MeSH C01.539.739 – respiratory tract infections ====
- MeSH C01.539.739.484 – empyema, pleural
- MeSH C01.539.739.484.320 – empyema, tuberculous
- MeSH C01.539.739.969 – whooping cough

==== MeSH C01.539.757 – sepsis ====
- MeSH C01.539.757.720 – septicemia
- MeSH C01.539.757.720.100 – bacteremia
- MeSH C01.539.757.720.100.375 – hemorrhagic septicemia
- MeSH C01.539.757.720.360 – fungemia
- MeSH C01.539.757.720.595 – parasitemia
- MeSH C01.539.757.720.750 – sepsis syndrome
- MeSH C01.539.757.720.800 – shock, septic
- MeSH C01.539.757.720.937 – viremia

==== MeSH C01.539.780 – sexually transmitted diseases ====
- MeSH C01.539.780.281 – sexually transmitted diseases, bacterial
- MeSH C01.539.780.281.201 – chancroid
- MeSH C01.539.780.281.301 – chlamydia infections
- MeSH C01.539.780.281.301.490 – lymphogranuloma venereum
- MeSH C01.539.780.281.401 – gonorrhea
- MeSH C01.539.780.281.451 – granuloma inguinale
- MeSH C01.539.780.281.859 – syphilis

==== MeSH C01.539.800 – skin diseases, infectious ====
- MeSH C01.539.800.130 – cellulitis
- MeSH C01.539.800.200 – dermatomycoses
- MeSH C01.539.800.200.055 – blastomycosis
- MeSH C01.539.800.200.100 – candidiasis, chronic mucocutaneous
- MeSH C01.539.800.200.105 – candidiasis, cutaneous
- MeSH C01.539.800.200.110 – chromoblastomycosis
- MeSH C01.539.800.200.500 – maduromycosis
- MeSH C01.539.800.200.600 – paracoccidioidomycosis
- MeSH C01.539.800.200.675 – sporotrichosis
- MeSH C01.539.800.200.720 – tinea
- MeSH C01.539.800.200.720.550 – onychomycosis
- MeSH C01.539.800.200.720.730 – tinea capitis
- MeSH C01.539.800.200.720.730.740 – tinea favosa
- MeSH C01.539.800.200.720.760 – tinea pedis
- MeSH C01.539.800.200.860 – tinea versicolor
- MeSH C01.539.800.460 – paronychia
- MeSH C01.539.800.720 – skin diseases, bacterial
- MeSH C01.539.800.720.110 – actinomycosis, cervicofacial
- MeSH C01.539.800.720.150 – angiomatosis, bacillary
- MeSH C01.539.800.720.210 – ecthyma
- MeSH C01.539.800.720.260 – erysipelas
- MeSH C01.539.800.720.310 – erythema chronicum migrans
- MeSH C01.539.800.720.320 – erythrasma
- MeSH C01.539.800.720.360 – granuloma inguinale
- MeSH C01.539.800.720.420 – hidradenitis suppurativa
- MeSH C01.539.800.720.557 – maduromycosis
- MeSH C01.539.800.720.630 – pinta
- MeSH C01.539.800.720.705 – rhinoscleroma
- MeSH C01.539.800.720.770 – staphylococcal skin infections
- MeSH C01.539.800.720.770.270 – furunculosis
- MeSH C01.539.800.720.770.270.200 – carbuncle
- MeSH C01.539.800.720.770.360 – impetigo
- MeSH C01.539.800.720.770.770 – staphylococcal scalded skin syndrome
- MeSH C01.539.800.720.790 – syphilis, cutaneous
- MeSH C01.539.800.720.820 – tuberculosis, cutaneous
- MeSH C01.539.800.720.820.260 – erythema induratum
- MeSH C01.539.800.720.820.470 – lupus
- MeSH C01.539.800.720.910 – yaws

==== MeSH C01.539.830 – suppuration ====
- MeSH C01.539.830.025 – abscess
- MeSH C01.539.830.025.020 – abdominal abscess
- MeSH C01.539.830.025.020.455 – liver abscess
- MeSH C01.539.830.025.020.455.460 – liver abscess, amebic
- MeSH C01.539.830.025.020.455.730 – liver abscess, pyogenic
- MeSH C01.539.830.025.020.810 – subphrenic abscess
- MeSH C01.539.830.025.160 – brain abscess
- MeSH C01.539.830.025.160.800 – toxoplasmosis, cerebral
- MeSH C01.539.830.025.325 – epidural abscess
- MeSH C01.539.830.025.490 – lung abscess
- MeSH C01.539.830.025.650 – periapical abscess
- MeSH C01.539.830.025.665 – periodontal abscess
- MeSH C01.539.830.025.675 – peritonsillar abscess
- MeSH C01.539.830.025.700 – psoas abscess
- MeSH C01.539.830.025.780 – retropharyngeal abscess
- MeSH C01.539.830.200 – cellulitis
- MeSH C01.539.830.305 – empyema
- MeSH C01.539.830.305.310 – empyema, pleural
- MeSH C01.539.830.305.310.320 – empyema, tuberculous
- MeSH C01.539.830.305.330 – empyema, subdural
- MeSH C01.539.830.694 – otitis media, suppurative
- MeSH C01.539.830.840 – thyroiditis, suppurative
- MeSH C01.539.830.900 – uveitis, suppurative

==== MeSH C01.539.861 – toxemia ====
- MeSH C01.539.861.375 – endotoxemia

==== MeSH C01.539.895 – urinary tract infections ====
- MeSH C01.539.895.219 – bacteriuria
- MeSH C01.539.895.719 – pyuria
- MeSH C01.539.895.775 – schistosomiasis haematobia

==== MeSH C01.539.947 – wound infection ====
- MeSH C01.539.947.692 – surgical wound infection

=== MeSH C01.703 – mycoses ===
==== MeSH C01.703.078 – aspergillosis ====
- MeSH C01.703.078.074 – aspergillosis, allergic bronchopulmonary
- MeSH C01.703.078.537 – neuroaspergillosis

==== MeSH C01.703.160 – candidiasis ====
- MeSH C01.703.160.165 – candidiasis, chronic mucocutaneous
- MeSH C01.703.160.170 – candidiasis, cutaneous
- MeSH C01.703.160.180 – candidiasis, oral
- MeSH C01.703.160.190 – candidiasis, vulvovaginal

==== MeSH C01.703.181 – central nervous system fungal infections ====
- MeSH C01.703.181.500 – meningitis, fungal
- MeSH C01.703.181.500.500 – meningitis, cryptococcal

==== MeSH C01.703.248 – cryptococcosis ====
- MeSH C01.703.248.290 – meningitis, cryptococcal

==== MeSH C01.703.295 – dermatomycoses ====
- MeSH C01.703.295.055 – blastomycosis
- MeSH C01.703.295.165 – candidiasis, chronic mucocutaneous
- MeSH C01.703.295.170 – candidiasis, cutaneous
- MeSH C01.703.295.182 – chromoblastomycosis
- MeSH C01.703.295.522 – maduromycosis
- MeSH C01.703.295.600 – paracoccidioidomycosis
- MeSH C01.703.295.675 – sporotrichosis
- MeSH C01.703.295.872 – tinea
- MeSH C01.703.295.872.458 – onychomycosis
- MeSH C01.703.295.872.541 – tinea capitis
- MeSH C01.703.295.872.541.500 – tinea favosa
- MeSH C01.703.295.872.707 – tinea pedis
- MeSH C01.703.295.936 – tinea versicolor

==== MeSH C01.703.343 – eye infections, fungal ====
- MeSH C01.703.343.900 – uveitis, suppurative
- MeSH C01.703.343.900.350 – endophthalmitis
- MeSH C01.703.343.900.675 – panophthalmitis

==== MeSH C01.703.534 – lung diseases, fungal ====
- MeSH C01.703.534.090 – aspergillosis, allergic bronchopulmonary
- MeSH C01.703.534.700 – pneumonia, pneumocystis

==== MeSH C01.703.617 – microsporidiosis ====
- MeSH C01.703.617.300 – encephalitozoonosis

==== MeSH C01.703.770 – Pneumocystis Infections ====
- MeSH C01.703.770.700 – pneumonia, pneumocystis

==== MeSH C01.703.980 – zygomycosis ====
- MeSH C01.703.980.600 – mucormycosis

=== MeSH C01.908 – zoonoses ===
The list continues at List of MeSH codes (C02).
