= List of MeSH codes (B06) =

The following is a partial list of the "B" codes for Medical Subject Headings (MeSH), as defined by the United States National Library of Medicine (NLM).

This list continues the information at List of MeSH codes (B05). Codes following these are found at List of MeSH codes (B07). For other MeSH codes, see List of MeSH codes.

The source for this content is the set of 2006 MeSH Trees from the NLM.

== MeSH B06 – plants ==
=== MeSH B06.388 – plant families and groups ===
==== MeSH B06.388.100 – angiosperms ====
- MeSH B06.388.100.008 – acanthaceae
- MeSH B06.388.100.008.022 – adhatoda
- MeSH B06.388.100.008.044 – andrographis
- MeSH B06.388.100.009 – aceraceae
- MeSH B06.388.100.009.500 – acer
- MeSH B06.388.100.010 – acoraceae
- MeSH B06.388.100.010.500 – acorus
- MeSH B06.388.100.014 – adoxaceae
- MeSH B06.388.100.018 – agavaceae
- MeSH B06.388.100.018.249 – agave
- MeSH B06.388.100.018.500 – yucca
- MeSH B06.388.100.020 – aizoaceae
- MeSH B06.388.100.020.500 – mesembryanthemum
- MeSH B06.388.100.022 – alangiaceae
- MeSH B06.388.100.025 – alismatidae
- MeSH B06.388.100.025.033 – alismataceae
- MeSH B06.388.100.025.033.044 – alisma
- MeSH B06.388.100.025.033.777 – sagittaria
- MeSH B06.388.100.025.399 – hydrocharitaceae
- MeSH B06.388.100.025.699 – potamogetonaceae
- MeSH B06.388.100.025.977 – zosteraceae
- MeSH B06.388.100.027 – aloe
- MeSH B06.388.100.037 – amaranthaceae
- MeSH B06.388.100.037.100 – achyranthes
- MeSH B06.388.100.037.130 – amaranthus
- MeSH B06.388.100.037.333 – celosia
- MeSH B06.388.100.044 – anacardiaceae
- MeSH B06.388.100.044.277 – anacardium
- MeSH B06.388.100.044.416 – mangifera
- MeSH B06.388.100.044.555 – pistacia
- MeSH B06.388.100.044.666 – rhus
- MeSH B06.388.100.044.705 – semecarpus
- MeSH B06.388.100.044.744 – toxicodendron
- MeSH B06.388.100.065 – annonaceae
- MeSH B06.388.100.065.500 – annona
- MeSH B06.388.100.065.750 – asimina
- MeSH B06.388.100.065.875 – guatteria
- MeSH B06.388.100.065.937 – polyalthia
- MeSH B06.388.100.065.968 – rollinia
- MeSH B06.388.100.065.984 – uvaria
- MeSH B06.388.100.075 – apiaceae
- MeSH B06.388.100.075.077 – anethum graveolens
- MeSH B06.388.100.075.088 – angelica
- MeSH B06.388.100.075.088.077 – angelica archangelica
- MeSH B06.388.100.075.088.538 – angelica sinensis
- MeSH B06.388.100.075.099 – apium graveolens
- MeSH B06.388.100.075.144 – bupleurum
- MeSH B06.388.100.075.166 – carum
- MeSH B06.388.100.075.180 – centella
- MeSH B06.388.100.075.199 – cnidium
- MeSH B06.388.100.075.211 – coriandrum
- MeSH B06.388.100.075.233 – cuminum
- MeSH B06.388.100.075.288 – daucus carota
- MeSH B06.388.100.075.294 – eryngium
- MeSH B06.388.100.075.300 – ferula
- MeSH B06.388.100.075.333 – foeniculum
- MeSH B06.388.100.075.388 – hemlock
- MeSH B06.388.100.075.388.155 – cicuta
- MeSH B06.388.100.075.388.188 – conium
- MeSH B06.388.100.075.411 – heracleum
- MeSH B06.388.100.075.488 – levisticum
- MeSH B06.388.100.075.511 – ligusticum
- MeSH B06.388.100.075.568 – oenanthe
- MeSH B06.388.100.075.625 – pastinaca
- MeSH B06.388.100.075.750 – petroselinum
- MeSH B06.388.100.075.798 – pimpinella
- MeSH B06.388.100.075.875 – sanicula
- MeSH B06.388.100.081 – apocynaceae
- MeSH B06.388.100.081.043 – alstonia
- MeSH B06.388.100.081.088 – amsonia
- MeSH B06.388.100.081.131 – apocynum
- MeSH B06.388.100.081.174 – aspidosperma
- MeSH B06.388.100.081.260 – catharanthus
- MeSH B06.388.100.081.346 – holarrhena
- MeSH B06.388.100.081.432 – nerium
- MeSH B06.388.100.081.604 – ochrosia
- MeSH B06.388.100.081.777 – rauvolfia
- MeSH B06.388.100.081.833 – strophanthus
- MeSH B06.388.100.081.888 – tabernaemontana
- MeSH B06.388.100.081.944 – thevetia
- MeSH B06.388.100.081.972 – vinca
- MeSH B06.388.100.081.986 – voacanga
- MeSH B06.388.100.084 – aquifoliaceae
- MeSH B06.388.100.084.500 – ilex
- MeSH B06.388.100.084.500.500 – ilex guayusa
- MeSH B06.388.100.084.500.750 – ilex paraguariensis
- MeSH B06.388.100.084.500.875 – ilex vomitoria
- MeSH B06.388.100.085 – araceae
- MeSH B06.388.100.085.066 – alocasia
- MeSH B06.388.100.085.077 – amorphophallus
- MeSH B06.388.100.085.088 – arisaema
- MeSH B06.388.100.085.109 – arum
- MeSH B06.388.100.085.177 – calla
- MeSH B06.388.100.085.199 – colocasia
- MeSH B06.388.100.085.211 – cyrtosperma
- MeSH B06.388.100.085.488 – philodendron
- MeSH B06.388.100.085.500 – pinellia
- MeSH B06.388.100.085.944 – xanthosoma
- MeSH B06.388.100.085.972 – zantedeschia
- MeSH B06.388.100.087 – araliaceae
- MeSH B06.388.100.087.033 – acanthopanax
- MeSH B06.388.100.087.249 – aralia
- MeSH B06.388.100.087.374 – eleutherococcus
- MeSH B06.388.100.087.412 – hedera
- MeSH B06.388.100.087.431 – kalopanax
- MeSH B06.388.100.087.450 – oplopanax
- MeSH B06.388.100.087.500 – panax
- MeSH B06.388.100.093 – arecaceae
- MeSH B06.388.100.093.088 – areca
- MeSH B06.388.100.093.188 – calamus
- MeSH B06.388.100.093.211 – cocos
- MeSH B06.388.100.093.750 – serenoa
- MeSH B06.388.100.096 – aristolochiaceae
- MeSH B06.388.100.096.211 – aristolochia
- MeSH B06.388.100.096.233 – asarum
- MeSH B06.388.100.099 – asclepiadaceae
- MeSH B06.388.100.099.038 – asclepias
- MeSH B06.388.100.099.077 – calotropis
- MeSH B06.388.100.099.099 – cryptolepis
- MeSH B06.388.100.099.110 – cynanchum
- MeSH B06.388.100.099.222 – gymnema
- MeSH B06.388.100.099.222.500 – gymnema sylvestre
- MeSH B06.388.100.099.249 – hemidesmus
- MeSH B06.388.100.099.500 – marsdenia
- MeSH B06.388.100.099.750 – periploca
- MeSH B06.388.100.099.875 – tylophora
- MeSH B06.388.100.100 – asteraceae
- MeSH B06.388.100.100.037 – achillea
- MeSH B06.388.100.100.041 – achyrocline
- MeSH B06.388.100.100.046 – ageratina
- MeSH B06.388.100.100.056 – ageratum
- MeSH B06.388.100.100.065 – ambrosia
- MeSH B06.388.100.100.070 – ammi
- MeSH B06.388.100.100.072 – arctium
- MeSH B06.388.100.100.075 – arnica
- MeSH B06.388.100.100.100 – artemisia
- MeSH B06.388.100.100.100.099 – artemisia absinthium
- MeSH B06.388.100.100.100.144 – artemisia annua
- MeSH B06.388.100.100.111 – aster plant
- MeSH B06.388.100.100.118 – atractylis
- MeSH B06.388.100.100.126 – atractylodes
- MeSH B06.388.100.100.133 – baccharis
- MeSH B06.388.100.100.137 – bidens
- MeSH B06.388.100.100.141 – calendula
- MeSH B06.388.100.100.154 – callilepis
- MeSH B06.388.100.100.168 – carduus
- MeSH B06.388.100.100.181 – carthamus
- MeSH B06.388.100.100.181.500 – carthamus tinctorius
- MeSH B06.388.100.100.188 – centaurea
- MeSH B06.388.100.100.195 – chamomile
- MeSH B06.388.100.100.195.099 – anthemis
- MeSH B06.388.100.100.195.288 – chamaemelum
- MeSH B06.388.100.100.195.488 – matricaria
- MeSH B06.388.100.100.195.744 – tripleurospermum
- MeSH B06.388.100.100.200 – chicory
- MeSH B06.388.100.100.203 – chromolaena
- MeSH B06.388.100.100.206 – chrysanthemum
- MeSH B06.388.100.100.206.222 – chrysanthemum cinerariifolium
- MeSH B06.388.100.100.227 – cirsium
- MeSH B06.388.100.100.241 – cnicus
- MeSH B06.388.100.100.244 – conyza
- MeSH B06.388.100.100.248 – coreopsis
- MeSH B06.388.100.100.255 – crepis
- MeSH B06.388.100.100.269 – cynara
- MeSH B06.388.100.100.269.500 – cynara scolymus
- MeSH B06.388.100.100.289 – dahlia
- MeSH B06.388.100.100.310 – echinacea
- MeSH B06.388.100.100.317 – echinops plant
- MeSH B06.388.100.100.337 – eclipta
- MeSH B06.388.100.100.342 – erigeron
- MeSH B06.388.100.100.347 – eupatorium
- MeSH B06.388.100.100.349 – flaveria
- MeSH B06.388.100.100.352 – geigeria
- MeSH B06.388.100.100.355 – gnaphalium
- MeSH B06.388.100.100.356 – grindelia
- MeSH B06.388.100.100.358 – haplopappus
- MeSH B06.388.100.100.400 – helianthus
- MeSH B06.388.100.100.425 – helichrysum
- MeSH B06.388.100.100.471 – inula
- MeSH B06.388.100.100.500 – lettuce
- MeSH B06.388.100.100.506 – leuzea
- MeSH B06.388.100.100.512 – mikania
- MeSH B06.388.100.100.525 – milk thistle
- MeSH B06.388.100.100.543 – montanoa
- MeSH B06.388.100.100.562 – onopordum
- MeSH B06.388.100.100.596 – petasites
- MeSH B06.388.100.100.631 – ratibida
- MeSH B06.388.100.100.665 – rudbeckia
- MeSH B06.388.100.100.700 – saussurea
- MeSH B06.388.100.100.750 – scolymus
- MeSH B06.388.100.100.775 – scorzonera
- MeSH B06.388.100.100.800 – senecio
- MeSH B06.388.100.100.816 – solidago
- MeSH B06.388.100.100.833 – sonchus
- MeSH B06.388.100.100.843 – stevia
- MeSH B06.388.100.100.853 – tagetes
- MeSH B06.388.100.100.874 – tanacetum
- MeSH B06.388.100.100.874.500 – tanacetum parthenium
- MeSH B06.388.100.100.895 – taraxacum
- MeSH B06.388.100.100.916 – tragopogon
- MeSH B06.388.100.100.958 – tussilago
- MeSH B06.388.100.100.979 – verbesina
- MeSH B06.388.100.100.984 – vernonia
- MeSH B06.388.100.100.989 – wedelia
- MeSH B06.388.100.100.994 – xanthium
- MeSH B06.388.100.106 – balanophoraceae
- MeSH B06.388.100.106.500 – cynomorium
- MeSH B06.388.100.112 – balsaminaceae
- MeSH B06.388.100.112.500 – impatiens
- MeSH B06.388.100.118 – begoniaceae
- MeSH B06.388.100.125 – berberidaceae
- MeSH B06.388.100.125.249 – berberis
- MeSH B06.388.100.125.311 – caulophyllum
- MeSH B06.388.100.125.342 – epimedium
- MeSH B06.388.100.125.374 – mahonia
- MeSH B06.388.100.125.500 – podophyllum
- MeSH B06.388.100.125.500.500 – podophyllum peltatum
- MeSH B06.388.100.137 – betulaceae
- MeSH B06.388.100.137.500 – alnus
- MeSH B06.388.100.137.750 – betula
- MeSH B06.388.100.137.875 – corylus
- MeSH B06.388.100.143 – bignoniaceae
- MeSH B06.388.100.143.500 – tabebuia
- MeSH B06.388.100.146 – bixaceae
- MeSH B06.388.100.148 – bombacaceae
- MeSH B06.388.100.148.500 – adansonia
- MeSH B06.388.100.148.750 – bombax
- MeSH B06.388.100.148.875 – ceiba
- MeSH B06.388.100.150 – boraginaceae
- MeSH B06.388.100.150.122 – amsinckia
- MeSH B06.388.100.150.188 – borago
- MeSH B06.388.100.150.210 – comfrey
- MeSH B06.388.100.150.327 – cordia
- MeSH B06.388.100.150.385 – echium
- MeSH B06.388.100.150.444 – heliotropium
- MeSH B06.388.100.150.501 – lithospermum
- MeSH B06.388.100.150.750 – pulmonaria
- MeSH B06.388.100.157 – brassicaceae
- MeSH B06.388.100.157.100 – arabidopsis
- MeSH B06.388.100.157.150 – arabis
- MeSH B06.388.100.157.175 – armoracia
- MeSH B06.388.100.157.187 – barbarea
- MeSH B06.388.100.157.200 – brassica
- MeSH B06.388.100.157.200.249 – brassica napus
- MeSH B06.388.100.157.200.277 – brassica rapa
- MeSH B06.388.100.157.200.500 – mustard plant
- MeSH B06.388.100.157.244 – Capsella (plant)
- MeSH B06.388.100.157.255 – cardamine
- MeSH B06.388.100.157.277 – crambe plant
- MeSH B06.388.100.157.357 – erysimum
- MeSH B06.388.100.157.438 – isatis
- MeSH B06.388.100.157.600 – lepidium
- MeSH B06.388.100.157.600.500 – lepidium sativum
- MeSH B06.388.100.157.644 – nasturtium
- MeSH B06.388.100.157.711 – raphanus
- MeSH B06.388.100.157.744 – rorippa
- MeSH B06.388.100.157.811 – sinapis
- MeSH B06.388.100.157.905 – thlaspi
- MeSH B06.388.100.157.952 – wasabia
- MeSH B06.388.100.159 – bromeliaceae
- MeSH B06.388.100.159.099 – ananas
- MeSH B06.388.100.159.244 – bromelia
- MeSH B06.388.100.159.622 – tillandsia
- MeSH B06.388.100.162 – burseraceae
- MeSH B06.388.100.162.111 – boswellia
- MeSH B06.388.100.162.138 – bursera
- MeSH B06.388.100.162.166 – commiphora
- MeSH B06.388.100.165 – buxaceae
- MeSH B06.388.100.165.500 – buxus
- MeSH B06.388.100.165.750 – pachysandra
- MeSH B06.388.100.168 – cactaceae
- MeSH B06.388.100.168.500 – opuntia
- MeSH B06.388.100.169 – calycanthaceae
- MeSH B06.388.100.171 – campanulaceae
- MeSH B06.388.100.171.200 – codonopsis
- MeSH B06.388.100.171.600 – lobelia
- MeSH B06.388.100.171.800 – platycodon
- MeSH B06.388.100.175 – cannabaceae
- MeSH B06.388.100.175.500 – cannabis
- MeSH B06.388.100.175.750 – humulus
- MeSH B06.388.100.177 – capparaceae
- MeSH B06.388.100.177.500 – capparis
- MeSH B06.388.100.177.750 – cleome
- MeSH B06.388.100.180 – caprifoliaceae
- MeSH B06.388.100.180.388 – lonicera
- MeSH B06.388.100.180.500 – sambucus
- MeSH B06.388.100.180.500.500 – sambucus nigra
- MeSH B06.388.100.180.625 – symphoricarpos
- MeSH B06.388.100.180.750 – viburnum
- MeSH B06.388.100.192 – caricaceae
- MeSH B06.388.100.192.500 – carica
- MeSH B06.388.100.195 – caryophyllaceae
- MeSH B06.388.100.195.055 – agrostemma
- MeSH B06.388.100.195.077 – arenaria plant
- MeSH B06.388.100.195.222 – dianthus
- MeSH B06.388.100.195.416 – lychnis
- MeSH B06.388.100.195.611 – saponaria
- MeSH B06.388.100.195.655 – silene
- MeSH B06.388.100.195.827 – stellaria
- MeSH B06.388.100.195.913 – vaccaria
- MeSH B06.388.100.196 – cecropiaceae
- MeSH B06.388.100.196.188 – cecropia plant
- MeSH B06.388.100.197 – celastraceae
- MeSH B06.388.100.197.155 – catha
- MeSH B06.388.100.197.199 – celastrus
- MeSH B06.388.100.197.366 – euonymus
- MeSH B06.388.100.197.577 – maytenus
- MeSH B06.388.100.197.682 – salacia
- MeSH B06.388.100.197.788 – tripterygium
- MeSH B06.388.100.200 – chenopodiaceae
- MeSH B06.388.100.200.199 – atriplex
- MeSH B06.388.100.200.299 – bassia scoparia
- MeSH B06.388.100.200.399 – beta vulgaris
- MeSH B06.388.100.200.599 – chenopodium
- MeSH B06.388.100.200.599.500 – chenopodium album
- MeSH B06.388.100.200.599.750 – chenopodium ambrosioides
- MeSH B06.388.100.200.599.875 – chenopodium quinoa
- MeSH B06.388.100.200.699 – salsola
- MeSH B06.388.100.200.800 – spinacia oleracea
- MeSH B06.388.100.204 – cistaceae
- MeSH B06.388.100.204.177 – cistus
- MeSH B06.388.100.216 – clethraceae
- MeSH B06.388.100.228 – combretaceae
- MeSH B06.388.100.228.166 – combretum
- MeSH B06.388.100.228.583 – terminalia
- MeSH B06.388.100.233 – commelinaceae
- MeSH B06.388.100.233.222 – commelina
- MeSH B06.388.100.233.611 – tradescantia
- MeSH B06.388.100.238 – convolvulaceae
- MeSH B06.388.100.238.124 – bonamia plant
- MeSH B06.388.100.238.249 – calystegia
- MeSH B06.388.100.238.374 – convolvulus
- MeSH B06.388.100.238.500 – ipomoea
- MeSH B06.388.100.238.500.500 – ipomoea batatas
- MeSH B06.388.100.238.500.750 – ipomoea nil
- MeSH B06.388.100.241 – cornaceae
- MeSH B06.388.100.241.299 – cornus
- MeSH B06.388.100.270 – corsiaceae
- MeSH B06.388.100.300 – cucurbitaceae
- MeSH B06.388.100.300.093 – bryonia
- MeSH B06.388.100.300.140 – citrullus
- MeSH B06.388.100.300.188 – cucumis
- MeSH B06.388.100.300.188.444 – cucumis melo
- MeSH B06.388.100.300.188.666 – cucumis sativus
- MeSH B06.388.100.300.222 – cucurbita
- MeSH B06.388.100.300.444 – gynostemma
- MeSH B06.388.100.300.522 – luffa
- MeSH B06.388.100.300.655 – momordica
- MeSH B06.388.100.300.655.249 – momordica charantia
- MeSH B06.388.100.300.827 – trichosanthes
- MeSH B06.388.100.306 – cuscuta
- MeSH B06.388.100.312 – cyperaceae
- MeSH B06.388.100.312.099 – carex plant
- MeSH B06.388.100.312.199 – cyperus
- MeSH B06.388.100.312.299 – eleocharis
- MeSH B06.388.100.318 – dilleniaceae
- MeSH B06.388.100.321 – dioncophyllaceae
- MeSH B06.388.100.325 – dioscoreaceae
- MeSH B06.388.100.325.500 – dioscorea
- MeSH B06.388.100.325.750 – tamus
- MeSH B06.388.100.327 – dipsacaceae
- MeSH B06.388.100.329 – droseraceae
- MeSH B06.388.100.329.500 – drosera
- MeSH B06.388.100.333 – ebenaceae
- MeSH B06.388.100.333.500 – diospyros
- MeSH B06.388.100.336 – elaeagnaceae
- MeSH B06.388.100.336.500 – hippophae
- MeSH B06.388.100.339 – elaeocarpaceae
- MeSH B06.388.100.343 – ericaceae
- MeSH B06.388.100.343.099 – arctostaphylos
- MeSH B06.388.100.343.211 – calluna
- MeSH B06.388.100.343.267 – gaultheria
- MeSH B06.388.100.343.324 – ledum
- MeSH B06.388.100.343.549 – rhododendron
- MeSH B06.388.100.343.774 – vaccinium
- MeSH B06.388.100.343.774.249 – blueberry plant
- MeSH B06.388.100.343.774.500 – huckleberry plant
- MeSH B06.388.100.343.774.750 – vaccinium macrocarpon
- MeSH B06.388.100.343.774.875 – vaccinium myrtillus
- MeSH B06.388.100.343.774.937 – vaccinium vitis-idaea
- MeSH B06.388.100.344 – eriocaulaceae
- MeSH B06.388.100.346 – erythroxylaceae
- MeSH B06.388.100.346.500 – coca
- MeSH B06.388.100.348 – eucommiaceae
- MeSH B06.388.100.350 – euphorbiaceae
- MeSH B06.388.100.350.077 – aleurites
- MeSH B06.388.100.350.199 – croton
- MeSH B06.388.100.350.333 – euphorbia
- MeSH B06.388.100.350.399 – hevea
- MeSH B06.388.100.350.461 – hippomane
- MeSH B06.388.100.350.488 – jatropha
- MeSH B06.388.100.350.505 – mallotus plant
- MeSH B06.388.100.350.535 – manihot
- MeSH B06.388.100.350.622 – phyllanthus
- MeSH B06.388.100.350.622.500 – phyllanthus emblica
- MeSH B06.388.100.350.650 – ricinus
- MeSH B06.388.100.350.650.300 – castor bean
- MeSH B06.388.100.350.737 – sapium
- MeSH B06.388.100.350.825 – suregada
- MeSH B06.388.100.401 – fabaceae
- MeSH B06.388.100.401.012 – abrus
- MeSH B06.388.100.401.025 – acacia
- MeSH B06.388.100.401.051 – albizzia
- MeSH B06.388.100.401.077 – arachis hypogaea
- MeSH B06.388.100.401.082 – aspalathus
- MeSH B06.388.100.401.087 – astragalus plant
- MeSH B06.388.100.401.087.500 – astragalus gummifer
- MeSH B06.388.100.401.087.750 – astragalus membranaceus
- MeSH B06.388.100.401.088 – bauhinia
- MeSH B06.388.100.401.090 – butea
- MeSH B06.388.100.401.093 – caesalpinia
- MeSH B06.388.100.401.094 – cajanus
- MeSH B06.388.100.401.096 – canavalia
- MeSH B06.388.100.401.098 – caragana
- MeSH B06.388.100.401.100 – cassia
- MeSH B06.388.100.401.112 – castanospermum
- MeSH B06.388.100.401.125 – chamaecrista
- MeSH B06.388.100.401.150 – cicer
- MeSH B06.388.100.401.162 – clitoria
- MeSH B06.388.100.401.175 – crotalaria
- MeSH B06.388.100.401.181 – cyamopsis
- MeSH B06.388.100.401.187 – cytisus
- MeSH B06.388.100.401.190 – dalbergia
- MeSH B06.388.100.401.193 – derris
- MeSH B06.388.100.401.194 – dipteryx
- MeSH B06.388.100.401.196 – dolichos
- MeSH B06.388.100.401.200 – erythrina
- MeSH B06.388.100.401.250 – galega
- MeSH B06.388.100.401.262 – genista
- MeSH B06.388.100.401.275 – gleditsia
- MeSH B06.388.100.401.300 – glycyrrhiza
- MeSH B06.388.100.401.300.500 – glycyrrhiza uralensis
- MeSH B06.388.100.401.318 – griffonia
- MeSH B06.388.100.401.337 – indigofera
- MeSH B06.388.100.401.356 – laburnum
- MeSH B06.388.100.401.375 – lathyrus
- MeSH B06.388.100.401.450 – lens plant
- MeSH B06.388.100.401.525 – lespedeza
- MeSH B06.388.100.401.562 – lotus
- MeSH B06.388.100.401.571 – lupinus
- MeSH B06.388.100.401.581 – maackia
- MeSH B06.388.100.401.590 – medicago
- MeSH B06.388.100.401.590.500 – medicago sativa
- MeSH B06.388.100.401.590.750 – medicago truncatula
- MeSH B06.388.100.401.592 – melilotus
- MeSH B06.388.100.401.594 – millettia
- MeSH B06.388.100.401.596 – mimosa
- MeSH B06.388.100.401.598 – mucuna
- MeSH B06.388.100.401.601 – myroxylon
- MeSH B06.388.100.401.606 – oxytropis
- MeSH B06.388.100.401.611 – pachyrhizus
- MeSH B06.388.100.401.625 – peas
- MeSH B06.388.100.401.649 – phaseolus
- MeSH B06.388.100.401.694 – physostigma
- MeSH B06.388.100.401.702 – prosopis
- MeSH B06.388.100.401.710 – psoralea
- MeSH B06.388.100.401.712 – pterocarpus
- MeSH B06.388.100.401.714 – pueraria
- MeSH B06.388.100.401.716 – robinia
- MeSH B06.388.100.401.718 – senna plant
- MeSH B06.388.100.401.726 – sesbania
- MeSH B06.388.100.401.734 – sophora
- MeSH B06.388.100.401.750 – soybeans
- MeSH B06.388.100.401.812 – spartium
- MeSH B06.388.100.401.843 – sphenostylis
- MeSH B06.388.100.401.875 – tamarindus
- MeSH B06.388.100.401.890 – tephrosia
- MeSH B06.388.100.401.898 – tetrapleura
- MeSH B06.388.100.401.906 – trifolium
- MeSH B06.388.100.401.937 – trigonella
- MeSH B06.388.100.401.952 – ulex
- MeSH B06.388.100.401.968 – vicia
- MeSH B06.388.100.401.968.500 – vicia faba
- MeSH B06.388.100.401.968.750 – vicia sativa
- MeSH B06.388.100.401.984 – wisteria
- MeSH B06.388.100.425 – fagaceae
- MeSH B06.388.100.425.249 – fagus
- MeSH B06.388.100.425.500 – quercus
- MeSH B06.388.100.437 – flacourtiaceae
- MeSH B06.388.100.437.249 – casearia
- MeSH B06.388.100.437.500 – ryania
- MeSH B06.388.100.443 – fumariaceae
- MeSH B06.388.100.443.500 – corydalis
- MeSH B06.388.100.443.750 – fumaria
- MeSH B06.388.100.450 – gentianaceae
- MeSH B06.388.100.450.188 – centaurium
- MeSH B06.388.100.450.391 – gentiana
- MeSH B06.388.100.450.492 – gentianella
- MeSH B06.388.100.450.594 – swertia
- MeSH B06.388.100.462 – geraniaceae
- MeSH B06.388.100.462.500 – geranium
- MeSH B06.388.100.462.750 – pelargonium
- MeSH B06.388.100.475 – hamamelidaceae
- MeSH B06.388.100.475.500 – hamamelis
- MeSH B06.388.100.475.750 – liquidambar
- MeSH B06.388.100.489 – hernandiaceae
- MeSH B06.388.100.503 – hippocastanaceae
- MeSH B06.388.100.503.500 – aesculus
- MeSH B06.388.100.517 – hippocrateaceae
- MeSH B06.388.100.531 – hydrophyllaceae
- MeSH B06.388.100.531.500 – eriodictyon
- MeSH B06.388.100.539 – illicium
- MeSH B06.388.100.549 – iridaceae
- MeSH B06.388.100.549.500 – crocus
- MeSH B06.388.100.549.750 – iris plant
- MeSH B06.388.100.569 – juglandaceae
- MeSH B06.388.100.569.249 – carya
- MeSH B06.388.100.569.500 – juglans
- MeSH B06.388.100.572 – krameriaceae
- MeSH B06.388.100.575 – lamiaceae
- MeSH B06.388.100.575.049 – agastache
- MeSH B06.388.100.575.051 – ajuga
- MeSH B06.388.100.575.075 – ballota
- MeSH B06.388.100.575.166 – coleus
- MeSH B06.388.100.575.231 – hedeoma
- MeSH B06.388.100.575.297 – hyptis
- MeSH B06.388.100.575.362 – isodon
- MeSH B06.388.100.575.428 – lavandula
- MeSH B06.388.100.575.446 – leonurus
- MeSH B06.388.100.575.455 – lycopus
- MeSH B06.388.100.575.465 – marrubium
- MeSH B06.388.100.575.474 – melissa
- MeSH B06.388.100.575.483 – mentha
- MeSH B06.388.100.575.483.444 – mentha piperita
- MeSH B06.388.100.575.483.500 – mentha pulegium
- MeSH B06.388.100.575.483.750 – mentha spicata
- MeSH B06.388.100.575.510 – monarda
- MeSH B06.388.100.575.538 – nepeta
- MeSH B06.388.100.575.647 – ocimum
- MeSH B06.388.100.575.647.500 – ocimum basilicum
- MeSH B06.388.100.575.702 – origanum
- MeSH B06.388.100.575.729 – orthosiphon
- MeSH B06.388.100.575.743 – perilla
- MeSH B06.388.100.575.743.500 – perilla frutescens
- MeSH B06.388.100.575.750 – phlomis
- MeSH B06.388.100.575.753 – plectranthus
- MeSH B06.388.100.575.755 – prunella
- MeSH B06.388.100.575.756 – rabdosia
- MeSH B06.388.100.575.757 – rosmarinus
- MeSH B06.388.100.575.922 – salvia
- MeSH B06.388.100.575.922.750 – salvia miltiorrhiza
- MeSH B06.388.100.575.922.770 – salvia officinalis
- MeSH B06.388.100.575.935 – satureja
- MeSH B06.388.100.575.942 – scutellaria
- MeSH B06.388.100.575.942.500 – scutellaria baicalensis
- MeSH B06.388.100.575.945 – sideritis
- MeSH B06.388.100.575.947 – stachys
- MeSH B06.388.100.575.948 – teucrium
- MeSH B06.388.100.575.974 – thymus plant
- MeSH B06.388.100.590 – lauraceae
- MeSH B06.388.100.590.149 – cinnamomum
- MeSH B06.388.100.590.149.124 – cinnamomum aromaticum
- MeSH B06.388.100.590.149.249 – cinnamomum camphora
- MeSH B06.388.100.590.149.500 – cinnamomum zeylanicum
- MeSH B06.388.100.590.177 – cryptocarya
- MeSH B06.388.100.590.399 – laurus
- MeSH B06.388.100.590.524 – lindera
- MeSH B06.388.100.590.555 – litsea
- MeSH B06.388.100.590.587 – ocotea
- MeSH B06.388.100.590.650 – persea
- MeSH B06.388.100.590.737 – sassafras
- MeSH B06.388.100.590.825 – umbellularia
- MeSH B06.388.100.600 – lecythidaceae
- MeSH B06.388.100.600.099 – barringtonia
- MeSH B06.388.100.600.133 – bertholletia
- MeSH B06.388.100.610 – liliaceae
- MeSH B06.388.100.610.100 – allium
- MeSH B06.388.100.610.100.149 – chive
- MeSH B06.388.100.610.100.300 – garlic
- MeSH B06.388.100.610.100.600 – onions
- MeSH B06.388.100.610.100.800 – shallots
- MeSH B06.388.100.610.111 – alstroemeria
- MeSH B06.388.100.610.117 – anemarrhena
- MeSH B06.388.100.610.162 – asparagus plant
- MeSH B06.388.100.610.181 – camassia
- MeSH B06.388.100.610.200 – colchicum
- MeSH B06.388.100.610.211 – convallaria
- MeSH B06.388.100.610.222 – cordyline
- MeSH B06.388.100.610.233 – crinum
- MeSH B06.388.100.610.255 – curculigo
- MeSH B06.388.100.610.277 – dracaena
- MeSH B06.388.100.610.313 – fritillaria
- MeSH B06.388.100.610.350 – galanthus
- MeSH B06.388.100.610.387 – hemerocallis
- MeSH B06.388.100.610.406 – hosta
- MeSH B06.388.100.610.415 – hyacinthus
- MeSH B06.388.100.610.425 – hypoxis
- MeSH B06.388.100.610.500 – lilium
- MeSH B06.388.100.610.509 – liriope plant
- MeSH B06.388.100.610.533 – lycoris
- MeSH B06.388.100.610.555 – narcissus
- MeSH B06.388.100.610.588 – ophiopogon
- MeSH B06.388.100.610.593 – ornithogalum
- MeSH B06.388.100.610.688 – polygonatum
- MeSH B06.388.100.610.716 – ruscus
- MeSH B06.388.100.610.730 – sansevieria
- MeSH B06.388.100.610.737 – scilla
- MeSH B06.388.100.610.744 – smilacina
- MeSH B06.388.100.610.772 – trillium
- MeSH B06.388.100.610.786 – tulipa
- MeSH B06.388.100.610.793 – urginea
- MeSH B06.388.100.610.800 – veratrum
- MeSH B06.388.100.610.900 – zigadenus
- MeSH B06.388.100.620 – linaceae
- MeSH B06.388.100.620.500 – flax
- MeSH B06.388.100.638 – loganiaceae
- MeSH B06.388.100.638.500 – gelsemium
- MeSH B06.388.100.638.750 – strychnos
- MeSH B06.388.100.638.750.500 – strychnos nux-vomica
- MeSH B06.388.100.665 – lythraceae
- MeSH B06.388.100.665.249 – cuphea
- MeSH B06.388.100.665.374 – lagerstroemia
- MeSH B06.388.100.665.437 – lawsonia plant
- MeSH B06.388.100.665.500 – lythrum
- MeSH B06.388.100.665.750 – woodfordia
- MeSH B06.388.100.680 – magnoliaceae
- MeSH B06.388.100.680.249 – liriodendron
- MeSH B06.388.100.680.500 – magnolia
- MeSH B06.388.100.690 – malpighiaceae
- MeSH B06.388.100.690.099 – banisteriopsis
- MeSH B06.388.100.690.355 – galphimia
- MeSH B06.388.100.700 – malvaceae
- MeSH B06.388.100.700.100 – abelmoschus
- MeSH B06.388.100.700.115 – althaea (plant)
- MeSH B06.388.100.700.244 – gossypium
- MeSH B06.388.100.700.288 – hibiscus
- MeSH B06.388.100.700.555 – malva
- MeSH B06.388.100.707 – melastomataceae
- MeSH B06.388.100.715 – meliaceae
- MeSH B06.388.100.715.061 – aglaia
- MeSH B06.388.100.715.124 – azadirachta
- MeSH B06.388.100.715.249 – cedrela
- MeSH B06.388.100.715.500 – melia
- MeSH B06.388.100.715.500.500 – melia azedarach
- MeSH B06.388.100.725 – menispermaceae
- MeSH B06.388.100.725.111 – cissampelos
- MeSH B06.388.100.725.124 – cocculus
- MeSH B06.388.100.725.249 – cyclea
- MeSH B06.388.100.725.500 – menispermum
- MeSH B06.388.100.725.625 – sinomenium
- MeSH B06.388.100.725.750 – stephania
- MeSH B06.388.100.725.750.500 – stephania tetrandra
- MeSH B06.388.100.725.875 – tinospora
- MeSH B06.388.100.735 – mistletoe
- MeSH B06.388.100.735.249 – loranthaceae
- MeSH B06.388.100.735.888 – viscaceae
- MeSH B06.388.100.735.888.699 – phoradendron
- MeSH B06.388.100.735.888.750 – viscum
- MeSH B06.388.100.735.888.750.500 – viscum album
- MeSH B06.388.100.740 – molluginaceae
- MeSH B06.388.100.745 – monimiaceae
- MeSH B06.388.100.745.500 – peumus
- MeSH B06.388.100.750 – moraceae
- MeSH B06.388.100.750.055 – antiaris
- MeSH B06.388.100.750.088 – artocarpus
- MeSH B06.388.100.750.144 – broussonetia
- MeSH B06.388.100.750.500 – ficus
- MeSH B06.388.100.750.599 – maclura
- MeSH B06.388.100.750.633 – morus
- MeSH B06.388.100.752 – moringa
- MeSH B06.388.100.752.500 – moringa oleifera
- MeSH B06.388.100.756 – myoporaceae
- MeSH B06.388.100.756.249 – eremophila plant
- MeSH B06.388.100.756.500 – myoporum
- MeSH B06.388.100.760 – myricaceae
- MeSH B06.388.100.760.500 – myrica
- MeSH B06.388.100.765 – myristicaceae
- MeSH B06.388.100.765.500 – myristica fragrans
- MeSH B06.388.100.770 – myrsinaceae
- MeSH B06.388.100.770.066 – ardisia
- MeSH B06.388.100.770.533 – embelia
- MeSH B06.388.100.773 – myrtaceae
- MeSH B06.388.100.773.366 – eucalyptus
- MeSH B06.388.100.773.374 – eugenia
- MeSH B06.388.100.773.522 – feijoa
- MeSH B06.388.100.773.649 – kunzea
- MeSH B06.388.100.773.713 – leptospermum
- MeSH B06.388.100.773.745 – melaleuca
- MeSH B06.388.100.773.761 – myrtus
- MeSH B06.388.100.773.777 – pimenta
- MeSH B06.388.100.773.888 – psidium
- MeSH B06.388.100.774 – nelumbonaceae
- MeSH B06.388.100.774.500 – nelumbo
- MeSH B06.388.100.775 – nyctaginaceae
- MeSH B06.388.100.775.500 – mirabilis
- MeSH B06.388.100.776 – nymphaeaceae
- MeSH B06.388.100.776.488 – nuphar
- MeSH B06.388.100.776.500 – nymphaea
- MeSH B06.388.100.778 – nyssaceae
- MeSH B06.388.100.778.188 – camptotheca
- MeSH B06.388.100.778.594 – nyssa
- MeSH B06.388.100.779 – ochnaceae
- MeSH B06.388.100.780 – olacaceae
- MeSH B06.388.100.782 – oleaceae
- MeSH B06.388.100.782.333 – forsythia
- MeSH B06.388.100.782.374 – fraxinus
- MeSH B06.388.100.782.416 – jasminum
- MeSH B06.388.100.782.499 – ligustrum
- MeSH B06.388.100.782.666 – olea
- MeSH B06.388.100.782.833 – syringa
- MeSH B06.388.100.786 – onagraceae
- MeSH B06.388.100.786.222 – clarkia
- MeSH B06.388.100.786.416 – epilobium
- MeSH B06.388.100.786.611 – oenothera
- MeSH B06.388.100.786.611.500 – oenothera biennis
- MeSH B06.388.100.787 – orchidaceae
- MeSH B06.388.100.787.222 – dendrobium
- MeSH B06.388.100.787.500 – gastrodia
- MeSH B06.388.100.787.888 – vanilla
- MeSH B06.388.100.788 – orobanchaceae
- MeSH B06.388.100.788.500 – cistanche
- MeSH B06.388.100.788.750 – orobanche
- MeSH B06.388.100.789 – paeonia
- MeSH B06.388.100.792 – pandanaceae
- MeSH B06.388.100.795 – papaveraceae
- MeSH B06.388.100.795.124 – argemone
- MeSH B06.388.100.795.249 – chelidonium
- MeSH B06.388.100.795.374 – eschscholzia
- MeSH B06.388.100.795.500 – papaver
- MeSH B06.388.100.795.750 – sanguinaria
- MeSH B06.388.100.803 – passifloraceae
- MeSH B06.388.100.803.500 – passiflora
- MeSH B06.388.100.806 – pedaliaceae
- MeSH B06.388.100.806.500 – harpagophytum
- MeSH B06.388.100.806.750 – sesamum
- MeSH B06.388.100.809 – phytolaccaceae
- MeSH B06.388.100.809.500 – phytolacca
- MeSH B06.388.100.809.500.500 – phytolacca americana
- MeSH B06.388.100.809.500.750 – phytolacca dodecandra
- MeSH B06.388.100.812 – piperaceae
- MeSH B06.388.100.812.332 – peperomia
- MeSH B06.388.100.812.666 – piper
- MeSH B06.388.100.812.666.249 – kava
- MeSH B06.388.100.812.666.374 – piper betle
- MeSH B06.388.100.812.666.500 – piper nigrum
- MeSH B06.388.100.818 – plantago
- MeSH B06.388.100.821 – plumbaginaceae
- MeSH B06.388.100.822 – poaceae
- MeSH B06.388.100.822.033 – agropyron
- MeSH B06.388.100.822.044 – agrostis
- MeSH B06.388.100.822.055 – andropogon
- MeSH B06.388.100.822.060 – avena sativa
- MeSH B06.388.100.822.066 – bambusa
- MeSH B06.388.100.822.071 – brachiaria
- MeSH B06.388.100.822.077 – bromus
- MeSH B06.388.100.822.151 – cenchrus
- MeSH B06.388.100.822.227 – coix
- MeSH B06.388.100.822.266 – cymbopogon
- MeSH B06.388.100.822.288 – cynodon
- MeSH B06.388.100.822.299 – dactylis
- MeSH B06.388.100.822.311 – digitaria
- MeSH B06.388.100.822.322 – echinochloa
- MeSH B06.388.100.822.333 – eleusine
- MeSH B06.388.100.822.344 – Elymus (plant)
- MeSH B06.388.100.822.355 – eragrostis
- MeSH B06.388.100.822.427 – festuca
- MeSH B06.388.100.822.463 – holcus
- MeSH B06.388.100.822.481 – hordeum
- MeSH B06.388.100.822.500 – lolium
- MeSH B06.388.100.822.616 – oryza sativa
- MeSH B06.388.100.822.680 – panicum
- MeSH B06.388.100.822.744 – paspalum
- MeSH B06.388.100.822.755 – pennisetum
- MeSH B06.388.100.822.777 – phalaris
- MeSH B06.388.100.822.788 – phleum
- MeSH B06.388.100.822.793 – poa
- MeSH B06.388.100.822.835 – saccharum
- MeSH B06.388.100.822.844 – sasa
- MeSH B06.388.100.822.857 – secale cereale
- MeSH B06.388.100.822.871 – setaria plant
- MeSH B06.388.100.822.894 – sorghum
- MeSH B06.388.100.822.918 – triticum
- MeSH B06.388.100.822.942 – vetiveria
- MeSH B06.388.100.822.966 – zea mays
- MeSH B06.388.100.823 – polygalaceae
- MeSH B06.388.100.823.500 – polygala
- MeSH B06.388.100.823.750 – securidaca
- MeSH B06.388.100.825 – polygonaceae
- MeSH B06.388.100.825.306 – eriogonum
- MeSH B06.388.100.825.333 – fagopyrum
- MeSH B06.388.100.825.437 – polygonum
- MeSH B06.388.100.825.437.500 – polygonum cuspidatum
- MeSH B06.388.100.825.700 – rheum
- MeSH B06.388.100.825.850 – rumex
- MeSH B06.388.100.826 – pontederiaceae
- MeSH B06.388.100.826.500 – eichhornia
- MeSH B06.388.100.827 – portulacaceae
- MeSH B06.388.100.827.500 – portulaca
- MeSH B06.388.100.829 – primulaceae
- MeSH B06.388.100.829.099 – anagallis
- MeSH B06.388.100.829.549 – cyclamen
- MeSH B06.388.100.829.774 – primula
- MeSH B06.388.100.831 – proteaceae
- MeSH B06.388.100.831.500 – macadamia
- MeSH B06.388.100.833 – punicaceae
- MeSH B06.388.100.835 – pyrolaceae
- MeSH B06.388.100.835.500 – pyrola
- MeSH B06.388.100.838 – ranunculaceae
- MeSH B06.388.100.838.022 – aconitum
- MeSH B06.388.100.838.033 – actaea
- MeSH B06.388.100.838.036 – adonis
- MeSH B06.388.100.838.077 – anemone
- MeSH B06.388.100.838.088 – aquilegia
- MeSH B06.388.100.838.182 – cimicifuga
- MeSH B06.388.100.838.205 – clematis
- MeSH B06.388.100.838.229 – coptis
- MeSH B06.388.100.838.277 – delphinium
- MeSH B06.388.100.838.337 – helleborus
- MeSH B06.388.100.838.397 – hydrastis
- MeSH B06.388.100.838.518 – nigella
- MeSH B06.388.100.838.518.500 – nigella damascena
- MeSH B06.388.100.838.518.750 – nigella sativa
- MeSH B06.388.100.838.666 – pulsatilla
- MeSH B06.388.100.838.733 – ranunculus
- MeSH B06.388.100.838.766 – semiaquilegia
- MeSH B06.388.100.838.883 – thalictrum
- MeSH B06.388.100.838.941 – xanthorhiza
- MeSH B06.388.100.839 – resedaceae
- MeSH B06.388.100.840 – rhamnaceae
- MeSH B06.388.100.840.111 – ceanothus
- MeSH B06.388.100.840.133 – colubrina
- MeSH B06.388.100.840.316 – frangula
- MeSH B06.388.100.840.408 – karwinskia
- MeSH B06.388.100.840.666 – Rhamnus (plant)
- MeSH B06.388.100.840.833 – ziziphus
- MeSH B06.388.100.841 – rhizophoraceae
- MeSH B06.388.100.842 – rosales
- MeSH B06.388.100.842.110 – chrysobalanaceae
- MeSH B06.388.100.842.222 – connaraceae
- MeSH B06.388.100.842.249 – crassulaceae
- MeSH B06.388.100.842.249.249 – kalanchoe
- MeSH B06.388.100.842.249.500 – rhodiola
- MeSH B06.388.100.842.249.750 – sedum
- MeSH B06.388.100.842.311 – grossulariaceae
- MeSH B06.388.100.842.311.500 – ribes
- MeSH B06.388.100.842.374 – hydrangeaceae
- MeSH B06.388.100.842.374.500 – hydrangea
- MeSH B06.388.100.842.500 – rosaceae
- MeSH B06.388.100.842.500.033 – agrimonia
- MeSH B06.388.100.842.500.055 – alchemilla
- MeSH B06.388.100.842.500.177 – crataegus
- MeSH B06.388.100.842.500.222 – eriobotrya
- MeSH B06.388.100.842.500.244 – filipendula
- MeSH B06.388.100.842.500.266 – fragaria
- MeSH B06.388.100.842.500.288 – geum
- MeSH B06.388.100.842.500.444 – malus
- MeSH B06.388.100.842.500.522 – photinia
- MeSH B06.388.100.842.500.601 – potentilla
- MeSH B06.388.100.842.500.625 – prunus
- MeSH B06.388.100.842.500.687 – pygeum
- MeSH B06.388.100.842.500.693 – pyracantha
- MeSH B06.388.100.842.500.699 – pyrus
- MeSH B06.388.100.842.500.724 – quillaja
- MeSH B06.388.100.842.500.750 – rosa
- MeSH B06.388.100.842.500.779 – sanguisorba
- MeSH B06.388.100.842.500.793 – sorbus
- MeSH B06.388.100.842.500.808 – spiraea
- MeSH B06.388.100.842.750 – saxifragaceae
- MeSH B06.388.100.842.750.500 – heuchera
- MeSH B06.388.100.850 – rubiaceae
- MeSH B06.388.100.850.200 – cephaelis
- MeSH B06.388.100.850.250 – cinchona
- MeSH B06.388.100.850.275 – coffea
- MeSH B06.388.100.850.377 – galium
- MeSH B06.388.100.850.388 – gardenia
- MeSH B06.388.100.850.404 – hamelia
- MeSH B06.388.100.850.422 – hedyotis
- MeSH B06.388.100.850.555 – mitragyna
- MeSH B06.388.100.850.566 – morinda
- MeSH B06.388.100.850.611 – oldenlandia
- MeSH B06.388.100.850.805 – pausinystalia
- MeSH B06.388.100.850.844 – psychotria
- MeSH B06.388.100.850.876 – rubia
- MeSH B06.388.100.850.909 – uncaria
- MeSH B06.388.100.850.909.500 – cat's claw
- MeSH B06.388.100.875 – rutaceae
- MeSH B06.388.100.875.077 – aegle
- MeSH B06.388.100.875.155 – casimiroa
- MeSH B06.388.100.875.177 – citrus
- MeSH B06.388.100.875.177.077 – citrus aurantiifolia
- MeSH B06.388.100.875.177.538 – citrus paradisi
- MeSH B06.388.100.875.177.769 – citrus sinensis
- MeSH B06.388.100.875.255 – dictamnus
- MeSH B06.388.100.875.333 – evodia
- MeSH B06.388.100.875.666 – murraya
- MeSH B06.388.100.875.717 – phellodendron
- MeSH B06.388.100.875.733 – pilocarpus
- MeSH B06.388.100.875.755 – poncirus
- MeSH B06.388.100.875.788 – ruta
- MeSH B06.388.100.875.922 – zanthoxylum
- MeSH B06.388.100.881 – salicaceae
- MeSH B06.388.100.881.666 – populus
- MeSH B06.388.100.881.833 – salix
- MeSH B06.388.100.882 – salvadoraceae
- MeSH B06.388.100.884 – santalaceae
- MeSH B06.388.100.884.666 – pyrularia
- MeSH B06.388.100.884.833 – santalum
- MeSH B06.388.100.885 – sapindaceae
- MeSH B06.388.100.885.111 – blighia
- MeSH B06.388.100.885.444 – litchi
- MeSH B06.388.100.885.722 – paullinia
- MeSH B06.388.100.885.861 – sapindus
- MeSH B06.388.100.886 – sapotaceae
- MeSH B06.388.100.886.500 – madhuca
- MeSH B06.388.100.886.555 – manilkara
- MeSH B06.388.100.886.577 – mimusops
- MeSH B06.388.100.886.666 – palaquium
- MeSH B06.388.100.886.699 – pouteria
- MeSH B06.388.100.886.849 – synsepalum
- MeSH B06.388.100.887 – saururaceae
- MeSH B06.388.100.889 – schisandraceae
- MeSH B06.388.100.889.500 – kadsura
- MeSH B06.388.100.889.750 – schisandra
- MeSH B06.388.100.892 – scrophulariaceae
- MeSH B06.388.100.892.055 – antirrhinum
- MeSH B06.388.100.892.089 – bacopa
- MeSH B06.388.100.892.124 – buddleja
- MeSH B06.388.100.892.194 – craterostigma
- MeSH B06.388.100.892.333 – digitalis
- MeSH B06.388.100.892.366 – euphrasia
- MeSH B06.388.100.892.555 – linaria
- MeSH B06.388.100.892.599 – mimulus
- MeSH B06.388.100.892.705 – pedicularis
- MeSH B06.388.100.892.758 – penstemon
- MeSH B06.388.100.892.811 – picrorhiza
- MeSH B06.388.100.892.833 – rehmannia
- MeSH B06.388.100.892.844 – scoparia
- MeSH B06.388.100.892.855 – scrophularia
- MeSH B06.388.100.892.877 – striga
- MeSH B06.388.100.892.899 – verbascum
- MeSH B06.388.100.892.905 – veronica
- MeSH B06.388.100.898 – simaroubaceae
- MeSH B06.388.100.898.044 – ailanthus
- MeSH B06.388.100.898.111 – brucea
- MeSH B06.388.100.898.333 – eurycoma
- MeSH B06.388.100.898.555 – picrasma
- MeSH B06.388.100.898.599 – quassia
- MeSH B06.388.100.898.799 – simarouba
- MeSH B06.388.100.901 – smilacaceae
- MeSH B06.388.100.901.500 – smilax
- MeSH B06.388.100.905 – solanaceae
- MeSH B06.388.100.905.049 – atropa
- MeSH B06.388.100.905.049.222 – atropa belladonna
- MeSH B06.388.100.905.145 – capsicum
- MeSH B06.388.100.905.166 – cestrum
- MeSH B06.388.100.905.188 – datura
- MeSH B06.388.100.905.188.500 – datura stramonium
- MeSH B06.388.100.905.202 – duboisia
- MeSH B06.388.100.905.274 – hyoscyamus
- MeSH B06.388.100.905.310 – lycium
- MeSH B06.388.100.905.322 – lycopersicon esculentum
- MeSH B06.388.100.905.347 – Mandragora
- MeSH B06.388.100.905.448 – petunia
- MeSH B06.388.100.905.499 – physalis
- MeSH B06.388.100.905.612 – scopolia
- MeSH B06.388.100.905.725 – solanum
- MeSH B06.388.100.905.725.610 – solanum glaucophyllum
- MeSH B06.388.100.905.725.666 – solanum melongena
- MeSH B06.388.100.905.725.699 – solanum nigrum
- MeSH B06.388.100.905.725.777 – solanum tuberosum
- MeSH B06.388.100.905.900 – tobacco
- MeSH B06.388.100.905.900.874 – tobacco, smokeless
- MeSH B06.388.100.905.950 – withania
- MeSH B06.388.100.910 – stemonaceae
- MeSH B06.388.100.915 – sterculiaceae
- MeSH B06.388.100.915.144 – cacao
- MeSH B06.388.100.915.166 – cola
- MeSH B06.388.100.915.583 – sterculia
- MeSH B06.388.100.920 – styracaceae
- MeSH B06.388.100.920.777 – styrax
- MeSH B06.388.100.924 – tamaricaceae
- MeSH B06.388.100.928 – theales
- MeSH B06.388.100.928.124 – actinidiaceae
- MeSH B06.388.100.928.124.500 – actinidia
- MeSH B06.388.100.928.249 – clusiaceae
- MeSH B06.388.100.928.249.166 – calophyllum
- MeSH B06.388.100.928.249.249 – clusia
- MeSH B06.388.100.928.249.333 – garcinia
- MeSH B06.388.100.928.249.333.200 – garcinia cambogia
- MeSH B06.388.100.928.249.333.400 – garcinia kola
- MeSH B06.388.100.928.249.333.600 – garcinia mangostana
- MeSH B06.388.100.928.249.500 – hypericum
- MeSH B06.388.100.928.249.750 – mammea
- MeSH B06.388.100.928.500 – theaceae
- MeSH B06.388.100.928.500.500 – camellia
- MeSH B06.388.100.928.500.500.500 – camellia sinensis
- MeSH B06.388.100.932 – thymelaeaceae
- MeSH B06.388.100.932.500 – daphne
- MeSH B06.388.100.932.909 – wikstroemia
- MeSH B06.388.100.938 – tiliaceae
- MeSH B06.388.100.938.144 – corchorus
- MeSH B06.388.100.938.333 – grewia
- MeSH B06.388.100.938.777 – tilia
- MeSH B06.388.100.938.888 – triumfetta
- MeSH B06.388.100.942 – tropaeolaceae
- MeSH B06.388.100.942.500 – tropaeolum
- MeSH B06.388.100.947 – turnera
- MeSH B06.388.100.948 – typhaceae
- MeSH B06.388.100.949 – ulmaceae
- MeSH B06.388.100.949.777 – trema
- MeSH B06.388.100.949.888 – ulmus
- MeSH B06.388.100.950 – urticaceae
- MeSH B06.388.100.950.077 – boehmeria
- MeSH B06.388.100.950.777 – parietaria
- MeSH B06.388.100.950.888 – urtica dioica
- MeSH B06.388.100.955 – valerianaceae
- MeSH B06.388.100.955.443 – nardostachys
- MeSH B06.388.100.955.665 – patrinia
- MeSH B06.388.100.955.888 – valerian
- MeSH B06.388.100.955.944 – valerianella
- MeSH B06.388.100.960 – verbenaceae
- MeSH B06.388.100.960.066 – avicennia
- MeSH B06.388.100.960.144 – callicarpa
- MeSH B06.388.100.960.155 – clerodendrum
- MeSH B06.388.100.960.411 – lantana
- MeSH B06.388.100.960.433 – lippia
- MeSH B06.388.100.960.855 – verbena
- MeSH B06.388.100.960.888 – vitex
- MeSH B06.388.100.962 – violaceae
- MeSH B06.388.100.962.888 – viola
- MeSH B06.388.100.965 – vitaceae
- MeSH B06.388.100.965.044 – ampelopsis
- MeSH B06.388.100.965.272 – cissus
- MeSH B06.388.100.965.500 – vitis
- MeSH B06.388.100.970 – winteraceae
- MeSH B06.388.100.970.199 – drimys
- MeSH B06.388.100.970.599 – pseudowintera
- MeSH B06.388.100.975 – zingiberales
- MeSH B06.388.100.975.124 – costus
- MeSH B06.388.100.975.323 – heliconiaceae
- MeSH B06.388.100.975.522 – marantaceae
- MeSH B06.388.100.975.555 – musaceae
- MeSH B06.388.100.975.555.500 – musa
- MeSH B06.388.100.975.727 – strelitziaceae
- MeSH B06.388.100.975.900 – zingiberaceae
- MeSH B06.388.100.975.900.033 – alpinia
- MeSH B06.388.100.975.900.099 – amomum
- MeSH B06.388.100.975.900.166 – curcuma
- MeSH B06.388.100.975.900.333 – elettaria
- MeSH B06.388.100.975.900.444 – ginger
- MeSH B06.388.100.987 – zygophyllaceae
- MeSH B06.388.100.987.088 – balanites
- MeSH B06.388.100.987.277 – guaiacum
- MeSH B06.388.100.987.399 – larrea
- MeSH B06.388.100.987.699 – peganum
- MeSH B06.388.100.987.849 – tribulus
- MeSH B06.388.100.987.924 – zygophyllum

==== MeSH B06.388.137 – bryophyta ====
- MeSH B06.388.137.500 – bryopsida
- MeSH B06.388.137.750 – sphagnopsida

==== MeSH B06.388.250 – fern ====
- MeSH B06.388.250.199 – dennstaedtiaceae
- MeSH B06.388.250.199.666 – pteridium
- MeSH B06.388.250.222 – dryopteridaceae
- MeSH B06.388.250.222.222 – dryopteris
- MeSH B06.388.250.222.611 – polystichum
- MeSH B06.388.250.461 – marsileaceae
- MeSH B06.388.250.700 – polypodiaceae
- MeSH B06.388.250.700.666 – polypodium
- MeSH B06.388.250.750 – pteridaceae
- MeSH B06.388.250.750.044 – adiantum
- MeSH B06.388.250.750.666 – pteris

==== MeSH B06.388.400 – gymnosperms ====
- MeSH B06.388.400.122 – coniferophyta
- MeSH B06.388.400.122.166 – cephalotaxus
- MeSH B06.388.400.122.188 – cupressaceae
- MeSH B06.388.400.122.188.199 – chamaecyparis
- MeSH B06.388.400.122.188.266 – cupressus
- MeSH B06.388.400.122.188.500 – juniperus
- MeSH B06.388.400.122.188.599 – libocedrus
- MeSH B06.388.400.122.188.799 – thuja
- MeSH B06.388.400.122.666 – pinaceae
- MeSH B06.388.400.122.666.033 – abies
- MeSH B06.388.400.122.666.222 – cedrus
- MeSH B06.388.400.122.666.444 – larix
- MeSH B06.388.400.122.666.755 – picea
- MeSH B06.388.400.122.666.777 – pinus
- MeSH B06.388.400.122.666.777.600 – pinus ponderosa
- MeSH B06.388.400.122.666.777.744 – pinus sylvestris
- MeSH B06.388.400.122.666.777.888 – pinus taeda
- MeSH B06.388.400.122.666.984 – pseudotsuga
- MeSH B06.388.400.122.666.992 – tsuga
- MeSH B06.388.400.122.833 – taxaceae
- MeSH B06.388.400.122.833.500 – taxus
- MeSH B06.388.400.122.855 – taxodiaceae
- MeSH B06.388.400.122.855.166 – cryptomeria
- MeSH B06.388.400.122.855.177 – cunninghamia
- MeSH B06.388.400.122.855.777 – sequoia
- MeSH B06.388.400.122.855.788 – sequoiadendron
- MeSH B06.388.400.122.855.833 – taxodium
- MeSH B06.388.400.186 – cycadophyta
- MeSH B06.388.400.186.199 – cycas
- MeSH B06.388.400.186.955 – zamiaceae
- MeSH B06.388.400.300 – ginkgo biloba
- MeSH B06.388.400.344 – gnetophyta
- MeSH B06.388.400.344.222 – ephedra
- MeSH B06.388.400.344.222.500 – ephedra sinica
- MeSH B06.388.400.344.333 – gnetum

==== MeSH B06.388.462 – hepatophyta ====
- MeSH B06.388.462.500 – frullania
- MeSH B06.388.462.750 – marchantia

==== MeSH B06.388.525 – lycopodiaceae ====
- MeSH B06.388.525.333 – huperzia
- MeSH B06.388.525.666 – lycopodium

=== MeSH B06.413 – plant components ===
==== MeSH B06.413.024 – plant components, aerial ====
- MeSH B06.413.024.249 – flowering tops
- MeSH B06.413.024.249.500 – flowers
- MeSH B06.413.024.249.500.500 – pollen
- MeSH B06.413.024.500 – fruit
- MeSH B06.413.024.500.500 – nuts
- MeSH B06.413.024.500.750 – seeds
- MeSH B06.413.024.750 – plant epidermis
- MeSH B06.413.024.750.200 – plant bark
- MeSH B06.413.024.812 – plant leaves
- MeSH B06.413.024.812.700 – pulvinus
- MeSH B06.413.024.875 – plant shoots
- MeSH B06.413.024.875.500 – cotyledon
- MeSH B06.413.024.875.750 – hypocotyl
- MeSH B06.413.024.875.875 – meristem
- MeSH B06.413.024.937 – plant stems
- MeSH B06.413.024.937.249 – hypocotyl
- MeSH B06.413.024.937.500 – meristem
- MeSH B06.413.024.937.750 – rhizome

==== MeSH B06.413.400 – plant roots ====
- MeSH B06.413.400.500 – meristem
- MeSH B06.413.400.500.600 – plant root cap
- MeSH B06.413.400.525 – mycorrhizae
- MeSH B06.413.400.625 – plant tubers
- MeSH B06.413.400.750 – rhizome

=== MeSH B06.915 – trees ===
The list continues at List of MeSH codes (B07).
