= Hypopyon =

Medical condition with inflammatory cells inside the front of the eye

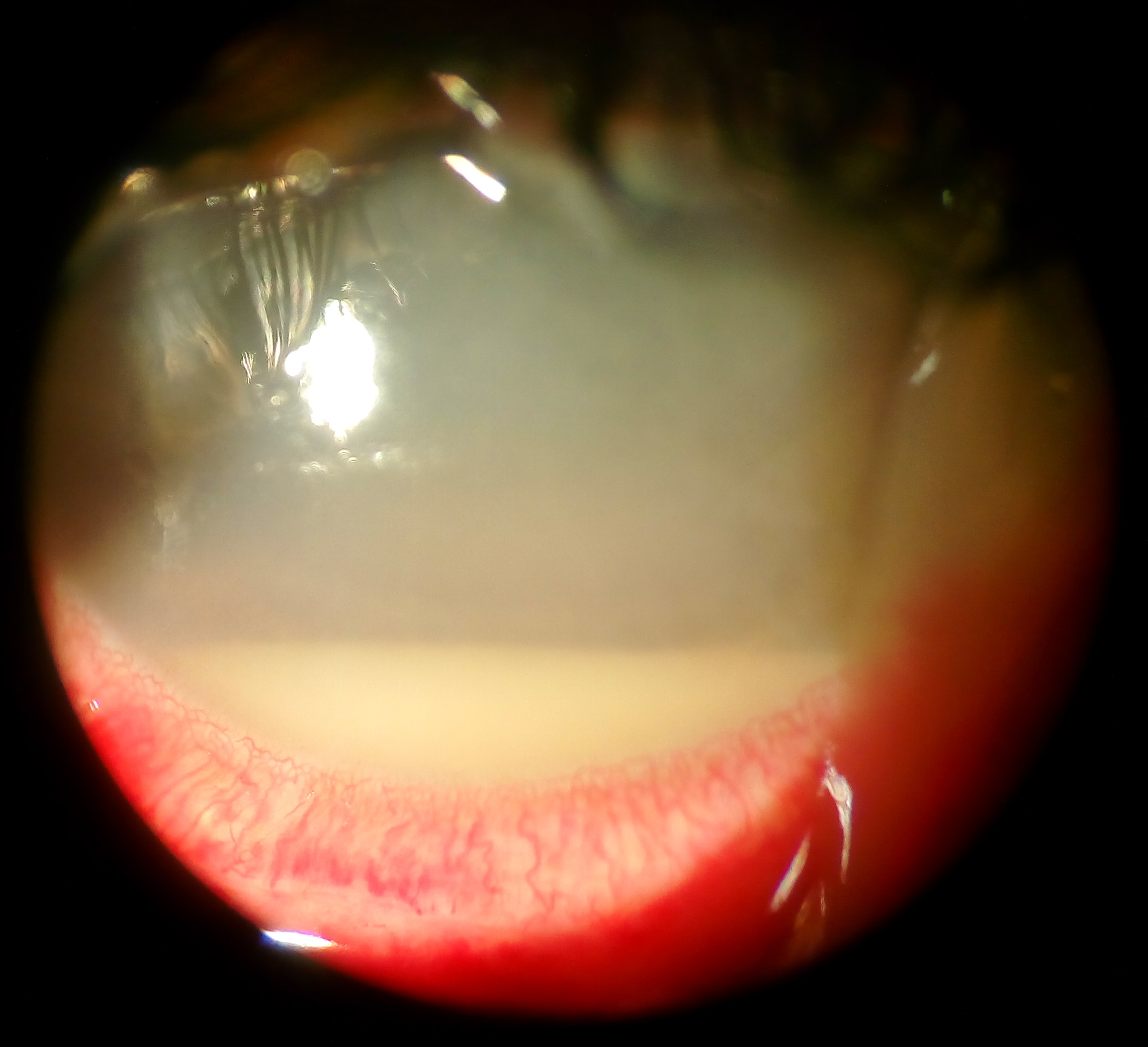
- Slit lamp view of hypopyon
- Specialty: Ophthalmology

Hypopyon is a medical condition involving inflammatory cells in the anterior chamber of the eye.

It is an exudate rich in white blood cells, seen in the anterior chamber, usually accompanied by redness of the conjunctiva and the underlying episclera. It is a sign of inflammation of the anterior uvea and iris, i.e. iritis, which is a form of anterior uveitis. The exudate settles at the dependent aspect of the eye due to gravity. It can be sterile (in bacterial corneal ulcer) or not sterile (fungal corneal ulcer).

== Cause ==
Common causes include a foreign body or corneal abrasion, which may be followed by bacterial or viral infection. It may also result from conjunctivitis, uveitis, scleritis, ectropion, photokeratitis, onchocerciasis, Behçet's disease and others.

== Diagnosis ==
=== Differential diagnosis ===
Hypopyon can be present in a corneal ulcer. It can occur as a result of Behçet's disease, endophthalmitis, panuveitis/panophthalmitis, or adverse reactions to some drugs (such as rifabutin).

Hypopyon is also known as sterile pus because it occurs due to the release of toxins and not by the actual invasion of pathogens. The toxins secreted by the pathogens mediate the outpouring of leukocytes that settle in the anterior chamber of the eye.

An inverse hypopyon is different from a standard hypopyon. Inverse hypopyon is seen after a pars plana vitrectomy with an insertion of silicone oil (as a replacement of the vitreous humour that has been removed in the operation; the silicone oil maintains internal tamponade). When the silicone oil emulsifies, it seeps into the anterior chamber and settles at the top of the anterior chamber. This is in contrast to hypopyon resulting from toxins where the leukocytes settle at the bottom of the anterior chamber. This is due to the effect of gravity, hence the name inverse hypopyon.

== Treatment ==
A hypopyon should not be drained, because it offers protection against the invading pathogen due to the presence of white blood cells, although long-standing hypopyon can cause close-angle glaucoma and anterior synechiae.

Intravitreal antibiotics can be used if endophthalmitis is suspected.

== See also ==
- Hyphema – Hemorrhage in the front chamber of the eye
- Uveitis – Inflammation of the uvea of the eye
