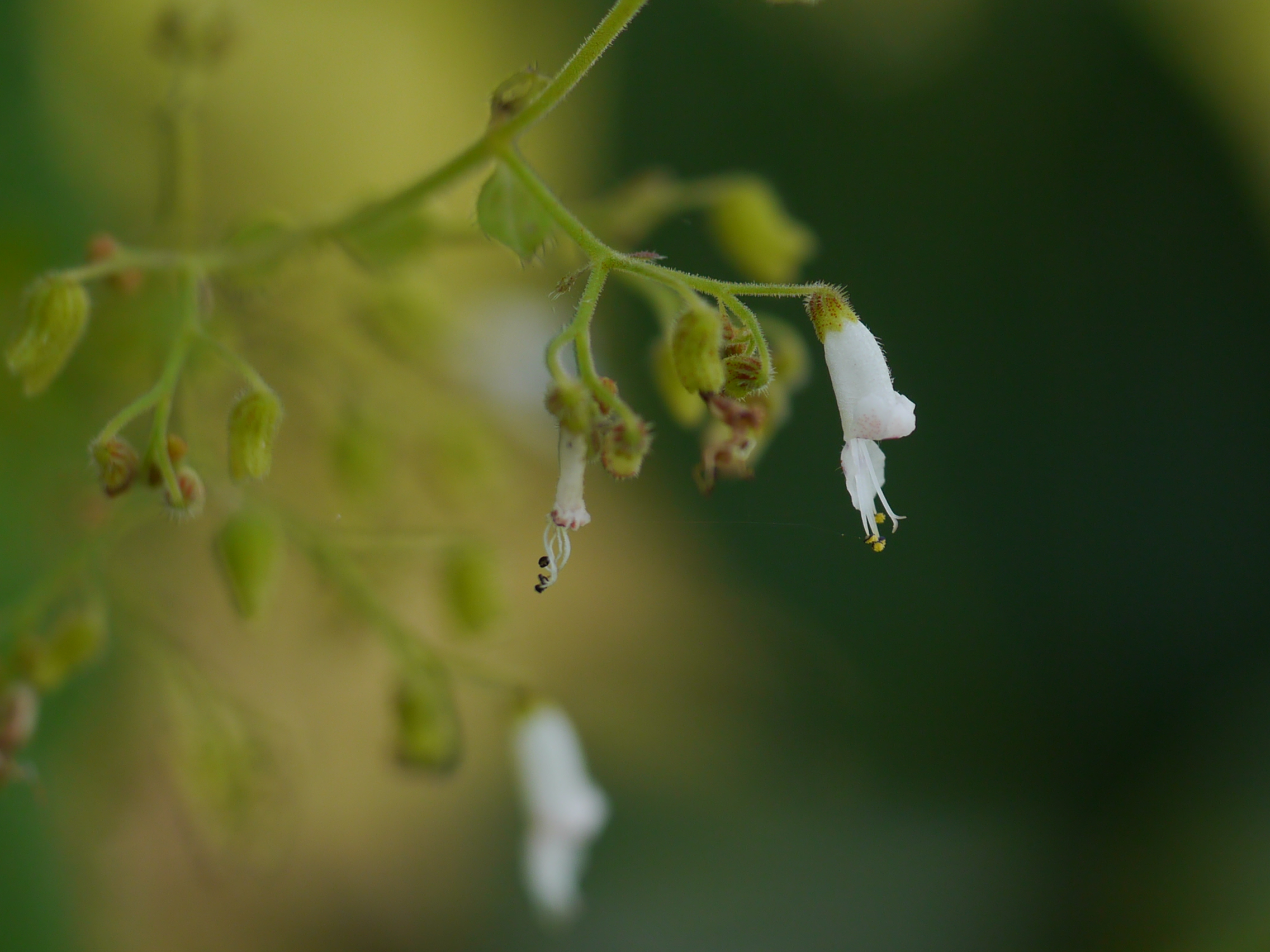

Scientific classification
- Kingdom: Plantae
- Clade: Tracheophytes
- Clade: Angiosperms
- Clade: Eudicots
- Clade: Asterids
- Order: Lamiales
- Family: Lamiaceae
- Genus: Isodon
- Species: I. lophanthoides

Binomial name
- Isodon lophanthoides (Buch.-Ham. ex D.Don) H.Hara

Synonyms
- Hyssopus lophanthoides Buch.-Ham. ex D.Don; Isodon lophanthoides var. gerardianus (Hand.-Mazz.) H.Hara; Plectranthus gerardianus Benth.; Plectranthus lophanthoides (Buch.-Ham. ex D.Don) Grierson & D.G.Long; Plectranthus lophanthoides var. gerardianus (Hand.-Mazz.) Bennet; Rabdosia lophanthoides (Buch.-Ham. ex D.Don) H.Hara; Rabdosia lophanthoides var. gerardiana (Hand.-Mazz.) H.Hara

= Isodon lophanthoides =

Crested flower isodon

Species of plant

Isodon lophanthoides is a species of plant in the family Lamiaceae native from the Indian subcontinent to China.

== Infraspecies ==
As of March 2020, there are two accepted varieties of this species.

- Isodon lophanthoides var. graciliflorus (Benth.) H.Hara
- Isodon lophanthoides var. lophanthoides
