= List of MeSH codes (B05) =

The following is a partial list of the "B" codes for Medical Subject Headings (MeSH), as defined by the United States National Library of Medicine (NLM).

This list continues the information at List of MeSH codes (B04). Codes following these are found at List of MeSH codes (B06). For other MeSH codes, see List of MeSH codes.

The source for this content is the set of 2006 MeSH Trees from the NLM.

== MeSH B05 – fungi ==
=== MeSH B05.107 – ascomycota ===
- MeSH B05.107.320 – eurotiales
- MeSH B05.107.320.200 – emericella
- MeSH B05.107.320.500 – monascus
- MeSH B05.107.320.800 – talaromyces
- MeSH B05.107.501 – hypocreales
- MeSH B05.107.501.200 – claviceps
- MeSH B05.107.501.220 – cordyceps
- MeSH B05.107.501.400 – gibberella
- MeSH B05.107.501.430 – hypocrea
- MeSH B05.107.575 – magnaporthe
- MeSH B05.107.650 – onygenales
- MeSH B05.107.650.080 – arthrodermataceae
- MeSH B05.107.715 – phyllachorales
- MeSH B05.107.730 – pneumocystis
- MeSH B05.107.730.650 – pneumocystis carinii
- MeSH B05.107.730.700 – pneumocystis jiroveci
- MeSH B05.107.780 – pseudallescheria
- MeSH B05.107.795 – saccharomycetales
- MeSH B05.107.795.536 – kluyveromyces
- MeSH B05.107.795.700 – pichia
- MeSH B05.107.795.785 – saccharomyces
- MeSH B05.107.795.785.800 – saccharomyces cerevisiae
- MeSH B05.107.795.815 – saccharomycopsis
- MeSH B05.107.795.980 – yarrowia
- MeSH B05.107.795.990 – zygosaccharomyces
- MeSH B05.107.797 – schizosaccharomyces
- MeSH B05.107.800 – sordariales
- MeSH B05.107.800.150 – chaetomium
- MeSH B05.107.800.629 – neurospora
- MeSH B05.107.800.629.564 – neurospora crassa
- MeSH B05.107.800.700 – podospora
- MeSH B05.107.950 – xylariales

=== MeSH B05.179 – basidiomycota ===
- MeSH B05.179.100 – agaricales
- MeSH B05.179.100.105 – agaricus
- MeSH B05.179.100.110 – amanita
- MeSH B05.179.100.200 – coprinus
- MeSH B05.179.100.350 – grifola
- MeSH B05.179.100.650 – pleurotus
- MeSH B05.179.100.750 – schizophyllum
- MeSH B05.179.120 – polyporales
- MeSH B05.179.120.379 – ganoderma
- MeSH B05.179.120.379.700 – lingzhi
- MeSH B05.179.120.760 – polyporaceae
- MeSH B05.179.120.760.500 – lentinula
- MeSH B05.179.120.760.500.810 – shiitake mushrooms
- MeSH B05.179.120.760.649 – phanerochaete
- MeSH B05.179.853 – ustilaginales
- MeSH B05.179.853.800 – ustilago

=== MeSH B05.283 – chytridiomycota ===
- MeSH B05.283.162 – blastocladiella
- MeSH B05.283.600 – neocallimasticales
- MeSH B05.283.600.600 – neocallimastix
- MeSH B05.283.600.675 – piromyces

=== MeSH B05.295 – fungal components ===
- MeSH B05.295.249 – fruiting bodies, fungal
- MeSH B05.295.249.500 – spores, fungal
- MeSH B05.295.500 – mycelium
- MeSH B05.295.500.400 – hyphae

=== MeSH B05.340 – lichens ===
- MeSH B05.340.915 – usnea

=== MeSH B05.360 – microsporidia ===
- MeSH B05.360.500 – microsporea
- MeSH B05.360.500.500 – microsporida
- MeSH B05.360.500.500.100 – apansporoblastina
- MeSH B05.360.500.500.100.175 – encephalitozoon
- MeSH B05.360.500.500.100.175.175 – encephalitozoon cuniculi
- MeSH B05.360.500.500.100.200 – enterocytozoon
- MeSH B05.360.500.500.100.400 – nosema
- MeSH B05.360.500.500.100.900 – vittaforma
- MeSH B05.360.500.500.600 – pansporablastina
- MeSH B05.360.500.500.600.050 – amblyospora
- MeSH B05.360.500.500.600.400 – glugea
- MeSH B05.360.500.500.600.500 – loma
- MeSH B05.360.500.500.600.650 – pleistophora
- MeSH B05.360.500.500.600.800 – thelohania
- MeSH B05.360.520 – microsporidia, unclassified

=== MeSH B05.381 – mitosporic fungi ===
- MeSH B05.381.025 – acremonium
- MeSH B05.381.075 – alternaria
- MeSH B05.381.081 – aspergillus
- MeSH B05.381.081.170 – aspergillus flavus
- MeSH B05.381.081.295 – aspergillus fumigatus
- MeSH B05.381.081.420 – aspergillus nidulans
- MeSH B05.381.081.450 – aspergillus niger
- MeSH B05.381.081.480 – aspergillus ochraceus
- MeSH B05.381.081.500 – aspergillus oryzae
- MeSH B05.381.125 – blastomyces
- MeSH B05.381.128 – botrytis
- MeSH B05.381.147 – candida
- MeSH B05.381.147.326 – candida albicans
- MeSH B05.381.147.400 – candida glabrata
- MeSH B05.381.147.800 – candida tropicalis
- MeSH B05.381.170 – chrysosporium
- MeSH B05.381.200 – cladosporium
- MeSH B05.381.230 – coccidioides
- MeSH B05.381.235 – colletotrichum
- MeSH B05.381.258 – cryptococcus
- MeSH B05.381.258.366 – cryptococcus neoformans
- MeSH B05.381.340 – epidermophyton
- MeSH B05.381.355 – exophiala
- MeSH B05.381.366 – fusarium
- MeSH B05.381.380 – geotrichum
- MeSH B05.381.385 – gliocladium
- MeSH B05.381.420 – helminthosporium
- MeSH B05.381.440 – histoplasma
- MeSH B05.381.515 – madurella
- MeSH B05.381.522 – malassezia
- MeSH B05.381.560 – microsporum
- MeSH B05.381.640 – paecilomyces
- MeSH B05.381.648 – paracoccidioides
- MeSH B05.381.662 – penicillium
- MeSH B05.381.662.592 – penicillium chrysogenum
- MeSH B05.381.706 – phialophora
- MeSH B05.381.740 – rhizoctonia
- MeSH B05.381.750 – rhodotorula
- MeSH B05.381.785 – scedosporium
- MeSH B05.381.820 – sporothrix
- MeSH B05.381.840 – stachybotrys
- MeSH B05.381.910 – trichoderma
- MeSH B05.381.928 – trichophyton
- MeSH B05.381.940 – trichosporon
- MeSH B05.381.950 – verticillium

=== MeSH B05.792 – spores ===
- MeSH B05.792.680 – spores, fungal

=== MeSH B05.930 – yeasts ===
- MeSH B05.930.176 – candida
- MeSH B05.930.176.326 – candida albicans
- MeSH B05.930.176.400 – candida glabrata
- MeSH B05.930.176.800 – candida tropicalis
- MeSH B05.930.316 – cryptococcus
- MeSH B05.930.316.366 – cryptococcus neoformans
- MeSH B05.930.536 – kluyveromyces
- MeSH B05.930.574 – malassezia
- MeSH B05.930.600 – pichia
- MeSH B05.930.650 – rhodotorula
- MeSH B05.930.705 – saccharomyces
- MeSH B05.930.705.655 – saccharomyces cerevisiae
- MeSH B05.930.710 – saccharomycopsis
- MeSH B05.930.720 – schizosaccharomyces
- MeSH B05.930.930 – trichosporon
- MeSH B05.930.980 – yarrowia

=== MeSH B05.975 – zygomycota ===
- MeSH B05.975.325 – entomophthorales
- MeSH B05.975.325.150 – conidiobolus
- MeSH B05.975.325.300 – entomophthora
- MeSH B05.975.550 – mucorales
- MeSH B05.975.550.030 – absidia
- MeSH B05.975.550.150 – cunninghamella
- MeSH B05.975.550.480 – mortierella
- MeSH B05.975.550.500 – mucor
- MeSH B05.975.550.750 – phycomyces
- MeSH B05.975.550.795 – rhizomucor
- MeSH B05.975.550.800 – rhizopus

The list continues at List of MeSH codes (B06).
