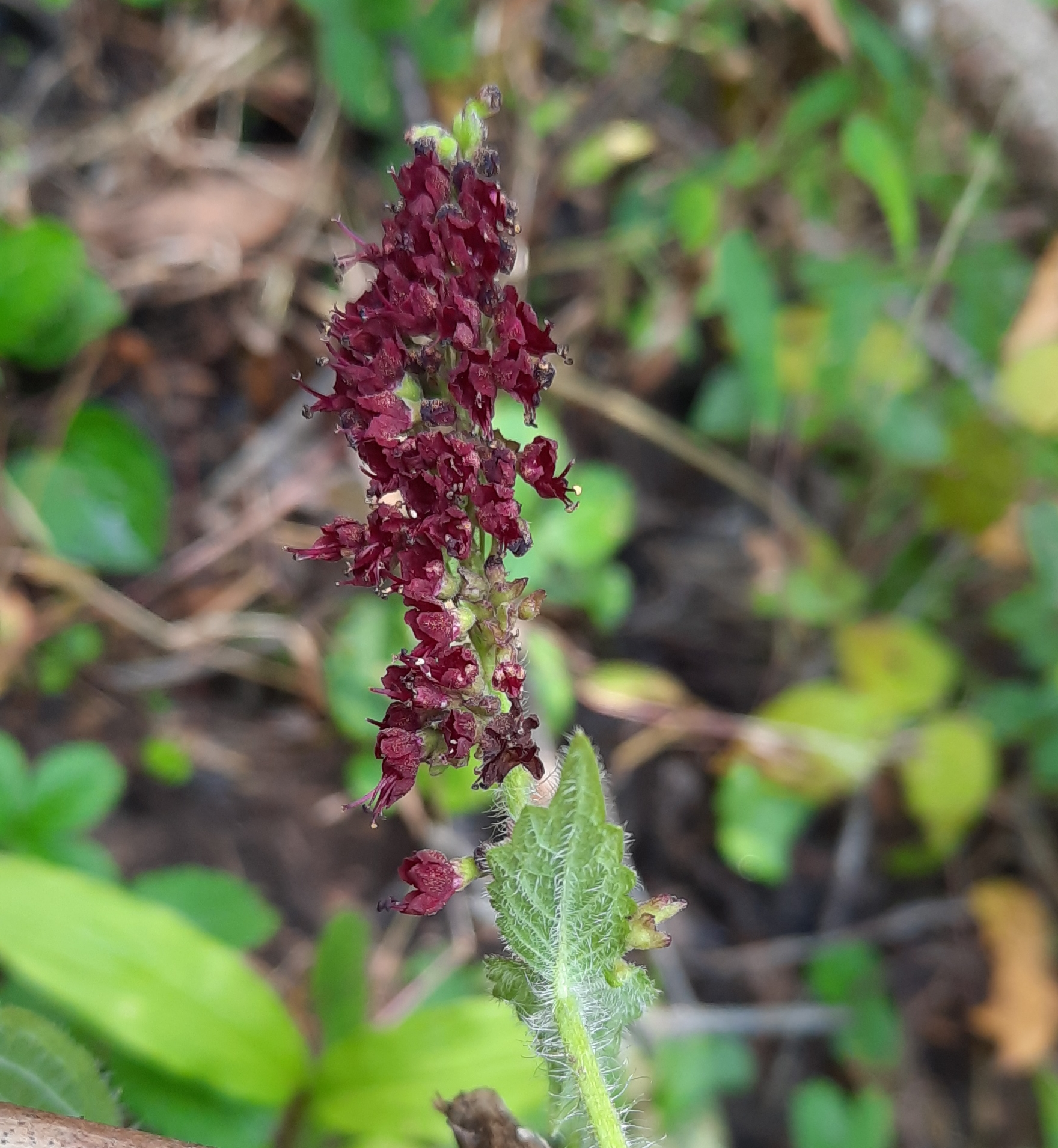

Conservation status
- Endangered (IUCN 3.1)

Scientific classification
- Kingdom: Plantae
- Clade: Tracheophytes
- Clade: Angiosperms
- Clade: Eudicots
- Clade: Asterids
- Order: Lamiales
- Family: Lamiaceae
- Genus: Isodon
- Species: I. atroruber

Binomial name
- Isodon atroruber R.A.Clement

= Isodon atroruber =

Species of flowering plant

Isodon atroruber is a species of flowering plant endemic to Bhutan. It differs from other species of Isodon in having deep wine red flowers in narrow panicles.

== Description ==
Isodon atroruber is a perennial herb with stems growing to around 50 cm. Stems little branched and four angled, glandular hairy. Leaves ovate, acuminate, base rounded-truncate with the lamina slightly decurrent on petiole. Leaf margin serrate-dentate. Upper surface of the leaves glandular-pubescent while the lower surface has villous hairs on veins. Inflorescence is a narrow panicle with deep wine red to deep reddish-purple corolla. Nutlets are ellipsoid and pale brown in color.

== Type status ==
The holotype was collected by Grierson & Long from Dotena in Thimphu district, Bhutan on 5 September 1984. The place is located at an elevation of 2550m from the sea level. The type specimen is currently held at the Herbarium, Royal Botanic Garden Edinburgh with catalogue number E00273726.
