= List of MeSH codes (B07) =

B07 prefixes

The following is a partial list of the "B" codes for Medical Subject Headings (MeSH), as defined by the United States National Library of Medicine (NLM).

This list continues the information at List of MeSH codes (B06). Codes following these are found at List of MeSH codes (B08). For other MeSH codes, see List of MeSH codes.

The source for this content is the set of 2006 MeSH Trees from the NLM.

== MeSH B07 – archaea ==
=== MeSH B07.075 – Thermoproteota ===
==== MeSH B07.075.200 – desulfurococcales ====
- MeSH B07.075.200.500 – desulfurococcaceae
- MeSH B07.075.200.500.050 – aeropyrum
- MeSH B07.075.200.650 – pyrodictiaceae

==== MeSH B07.075.725 – sulfolobales ====
- MeSH B07.075.725.725 – sulfolobaceae
- MeSH B07.075.725.725.030 – acidianus
- MeSH B07.075.725.725.725 – sulfolobus
- MeSH B07.075.725.725.725.070 – sulfolobus acidocaldarius
- MeSH B07.075.725.725.725.800 – sulfolobus solfataricus

==== MeSH B07.075.800 – thermoproteales ====
- MeSH B07.075.800.780 – thermofilaceae
- MeSH B07.075.800.800 – thermoproteaceae
- MeSH B07.075.800.800.650 – pyrobaculum
- MeSH B07.075.800.800.800 – thermoproteus

=== MeSH B07.200 – euryarchaeota ===
==== MeSH B07.200.080 – archaeoglobales ====
- MeSH B07.200.080.080 – archaeoglobus
- MeSH B07.200.080.080.100 – archaeoglobus fulgidus

==== MeSH B07.200.400 – halobacteriales ====
- MeSH B07.200.400.400 – halobacteriaceae
- MeSH B07.200.400.400.400 – haloarcula
- MeSH B07.200.400.400.400.410 – haloarcula marismortui
- MeSH B07.200.400.400.410 – halobacterium
- MeSH B07.200.400.400.410.450 – halobacterium salinarum
- MeSH B07.200.400.400.420 – halococcus
- MeSH B07.200.400.400.440 – haloferax
- MeSH B07.200.400.400.440.500 – haloferax mediterranei
- MeSH B07.200.400.400.440.900 – haloferax volcanii
- MeSH B07.200.400.400.550 – natronobacterium
- MeSH B07.200.400.400.560 – natronococcus

==== MeSH B07.200.492 – methanobacteriales ====
- MeSH B07.200.492.500 – methanobacteriaceae
- MeSH B07.200.492.500.500 – methanobacterium
- MeSH B07.200.492.500.515 – methanobrevibacter

==== MeSH B07.200.538 – methanococcales ====
- MeSH B07.200.538.525 – methanococcaceae
- MeSH B07.200.538.525.500 – methanococcus

==== MeSH B07.200.705 – methanomicrobiales ====
- MeSH B07.200.705.500 – methanomicrobiaceae
- MeSH B07.200.705.750 – methanospirillum

==== MeSH B07.200.765 – methanosarcinales ====
- MeSH B07.200.765.550 – methanosarcinaceae
- MeSH B07.200.765.550.550 – methanosarcina
- MeSH B07.200.765.550.550.200 – methanosarcina barkeri

==== MeSH B07.200.825 – thermococcales ====
- MeSH B07.200.825.800 – thermococcaceae
- MeSH B07.200.825.800.650 – pyrococcus
- MeSH B07.200.825.800.650.020 – pyrococcus abyssi
- MeSH B07.200.825.800.650.300 – pyrococcus furiosus
- MeSH B07.200.825.800.650.400 – pyrococcus horikoshii
- MeSH B07.200.825.800.800 – thermococcus

==== MeSH B07.200.850 – thermoplasmales ====
- MeSH B07.200.850.800 – thermoplasma

=== MeSH B07.600 – nanoarchaeota ===
The list continues at List of MeSH codes (B08).
