= Hemorrhagic septicemia =

Bacterial disease of animals

Haemorrhagic septicaemia (HS) is one of the most economically important pasteurelloses. Haemorrhagic septicaemia in cattle and buffaloes was previously known to be associated with one of two serotypes of P. multocida: Asian B:2 and African E:2 according to the Carter-Heddleston system, or 6:B and 6:E using the Namioka-Carter system.

The disease occurs mainly in cattle and buffaloes, but has also been reported in goats (Capra aegagrus hircus), African buffalo (Syncerus nanus), camels, horses and donkeys (Equus africanus asinus), in pigs infected by serogroup B, and in wild elephants (Elephas maximus). Serotypes B:1 and B:3,4 have caused septicaemic disease in antelope (Antilocapra americana) and elk (Cervus canadensis), respectively. Serotype B:4 was associated with the disease in bison (Bison bison).

HS outbreaks were associated with serotype E:2 in Africa and serotype B:2 in Asia. Serotype E:2 was reported in Senegal, Mali, Guinea, Ivory Coast, Nigeria, Cameroon, the Central African Republic and Zambia. However, it is now inaccurate to associate outbreaks in Africa with serotype E:2, as many outbreaks of HS in Africa have now been associated with serogroup B. In the same manner, serogroup E has been associated with outbreaks in Asia; for instance, one record of "Asian serotype" B:2 was reported in Cameroon. Some reports showed that serotype B:2 may be present in some East African countries. Both serogroups B and E have been reported in Egypt and Sudan.

Natural routes of infection are inhalation and/or ingestion. Experimental transmission has succeeded using intranasal aerosol spray or oral drenching. When subcutaneous inoculation is used experimentally, it results in rapid onset of the disease, a shorter clinical course, and less marked pathological lesions, compared to the longer course of disease and more profound lesions associated with oral drenching and intranasal infection by aerosols.

When HS was introduced for the first time into a geographic area, morbidity and mortality rates were high, approaching 100% unless animals were treated in the very early stages of disease.

== Clinical signs ==
A wide variety of clinical signs have been described for HS in cattle and buffaloes. The incubation periods for buffalo calves 4–10 months of age varies according to the route of infection. The incubation period is 12–14 hours for subcutaneous infection, approximately 30 hours for oral infection, and 46–80 hours for natural exposure.

There is variability in the duration of the clinical course of the disease. In the case of experimental subcutaneous infection, the clinical course lasted only a few hours, while it persisted for 2–5 days following oral infection and in buffaloes and cattle that had been exposed to naturally-infected animals. It has also been recorded from field observations that the clinical courses were 4–12 hours for per-acute cases and 2–3 days for acute cases.

Generally, progression of the disease in buffaloes and cattle is divided into three phases. Phase one is characterised by fever, with a rectal temperature of 40–41 °C (104–106 °F), loss of appetite, and depression. Phase two is typified by increased respiratory rate (40–50/minute), laboured breathing, clear nasal discharge (which turns opaque and mucopurulent as the disease progresses), salivation, and submandibular oedema spreading to the pectoral (brisket) region and even to the forelegs. Finally, in phase three, there is typically recumbency, continued acute respiratory distress and terminal septicaemia. The three phases overlap when the disease course is short. In general, buffaloes have a more acute onset of disease than cattle, with a shorter duration.

== Pathology and pathogenesis ==
On post-mortem examination (necropsy), the most obvious gross lesion is subcutaneous oedema in the submandibular and pectoral (brisket) regions. Petechial haemorrhages are found subcutaneously and in the thoracic cavity. In addition, congestion and various degrees of consolidation of the lung may occur. Animals that die within 24–36 hours have only few petechial haemorrhages on the heart and generalised congestion of the lung, while in animals that die after 72 hours, petechial and ecchymotic haemorrhages are more evident and lung consolidation is more extensive.

== Diagnosis ==
Diagnosis on Bases of blood smear and Clinical findings.

== Management ==
Sulphadimadine 100 ml orally and injection of oxytetracycline 40 ml for 3 days continuously.

== Epidemiology ==
Three factors affect the global distribution of HS: climatic conditions, husbandry practices, and the species of animal. For example, in 1981, Sri Lanka was a good example of different distribution patterns because it had a variety of agroclimatic regions and different husbandry practices. Consequently, Sri Lanka had distinct endemic and non-endemic areas for HS. The disease was almost non-existent where there was a predominance of hills. Here, the climatic conditions were mild, and temperate dairy breeds were reared. In contrast to this, in the warmer dry plains, where there were seasonal heavy rains and indigenous cattle, buffaloes, and zebu cattle, the disease was endemic. Occasional sporadic outbreaks happened in areas with topography, climate, and animals that were between these extremes.

Generally, South Asia is the area of highest prevalence and incidence of HS. This is attributed to radical changes in weather between seasons, animal debilitation caused by seasonal scarcities of fodder, and physical stressors related to the work that these animals perform. The disease also occurs, to a lesser extent, in the Middle East and Africa. Predisposing conditions are not as clearly defined for those locations as in South Asia.

In India from 1974–1986, HS was responsible for the highest mortality rate of infectious diseases in buffaloes and cattle, and was second in its morbidity rate in the same animals. When compared to foot and mouth disease, rinderpest, anthrax and black leg, HS accounted for 58.7% of the deaths due to these five endemic diseases.

Hemorrhagic septicemia is the most important bacterial disease of cattle and buffaloes in Pakistan. In Pakistan, it is a disease of great economic importance; in the Punjab province alone, the financial losses due to HS were estimated to be more than 2.17 billion Pakistani rupees (equivalent to 58 million USD) in 1996. According to farmers' opinions in a participatory disease surveillance (PDS) done in Karachi, HS is more important than foot and mouth disease (FMD), and this is due to the higher mortality rate and the greater economic impact of HS.

== See also ==
- Sepsis (presence of microorganisms in the blood)
