= Endophthalmitis =

- Other names: Endophthalmia
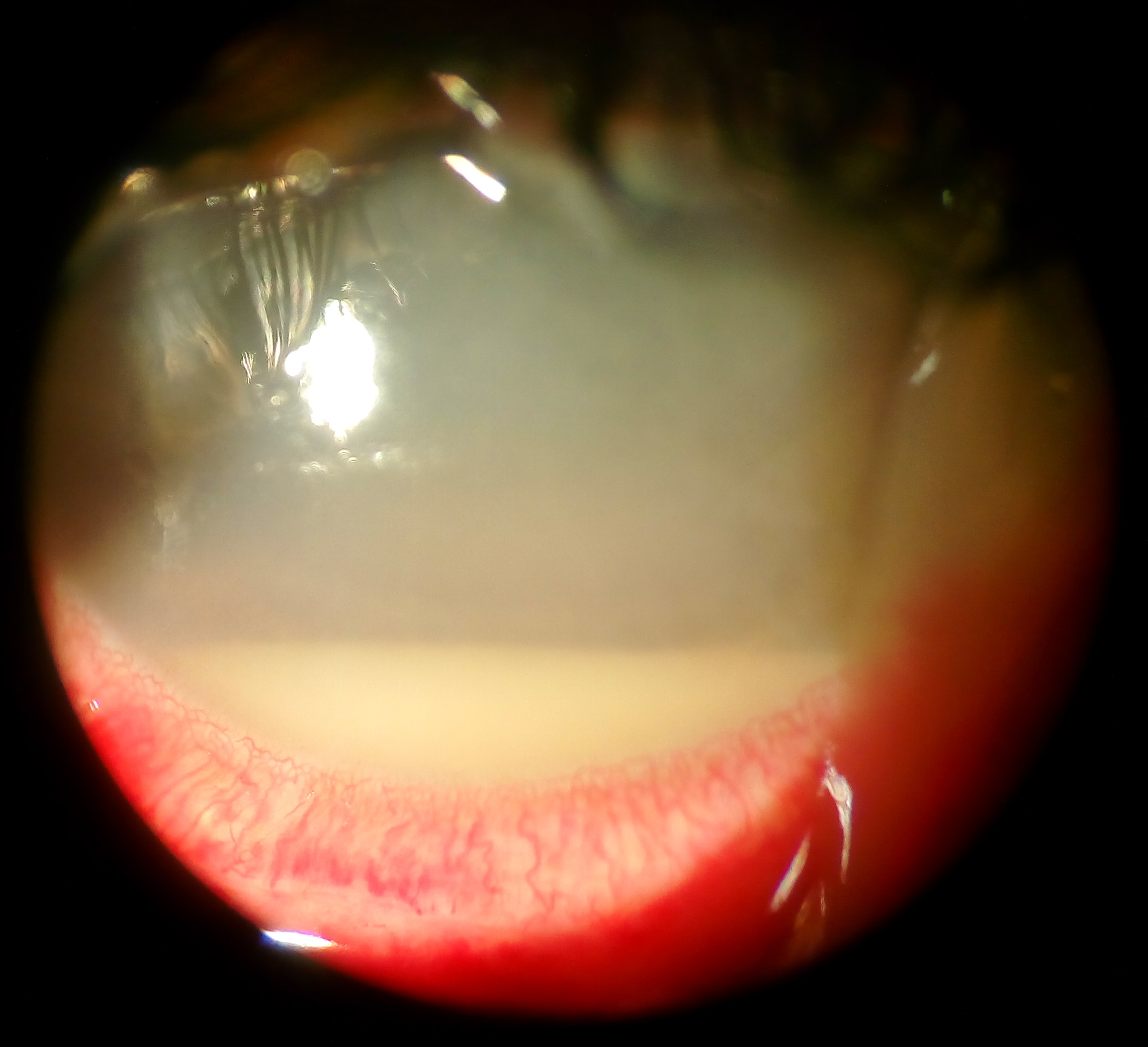
- Hypopyon with hazy media
- Specialty: Ophthalmology

Endophthalmitis, or endophthalmia, is inflammation of the interior cavity of the eye, usually caused by an infection. It is a possible complication of all intraocular surgeries, particularly cataract surgery, and can result in loss of vision or loss of the eye itself. Infection can be caused by bacteria or fungi, and is classified as exogenous (infection introduced by direct inoculation as in surgery or penetrating trauma), or endogenous (organisms carried by blood vessels to the eye from another site of infection and is more common in people who have an immunocompromised state). Other non-infectious causes include toxins, allergic reactions, and retained intraocular foreign bodies. Intravitreal injections are a rare cause, with an incidence rate usually less than 0.05%.

Endophthalmitis requires immediate medical attention to ensure the condition is diagnosed as soon as possible and treatment is started in order to reduce the risk of the person losing vision in the eye. Treatment options depend on the cause and whether the condition is caused by an endogenous or exogenous mechanism. For people with suspected exogenous endophthalmitis, a biopsy (vitreous tap) and treatment with antibiotics (usually by injection) is usually the first line of treatment. Once the person's response to the antibiotics is assessed, different further treatment options may be considered including surgery.

== Signs and symptoms ==
Symptoms of endophthalmitis include severe eye pain, vision loss, and intense redness of the conjunctiva. Bacterial endophthalmitis more commonly presents with severe and sudden symptoms whereas fungal causes have a more insidious onset and severity, with 80% of ocular candidiasis (both chorioretinitis and endophthalmitis) being asymptomatic. Hypopyon, or inflammatory cells in the anterior chamber of the eye may be present. In endogenous endophthalmitis systemic signs and symptoms may be present, including fevers, chills, mental status changes, hypotension or other signs of sepsis. 8-20% of endogenous endophthalmitis affect both eyes. In both endogenous and exogenous types of endophthalmitis, approximately 20% of people will experience severe vision loss.

=== Complications ===
- Panophthalmitis — Progression to involve all the coats of the eye.
- Corneal ulcer
- Orbital cellulitis
- Impairment of vision
- Complete loss of vision
- Loss of eye architecture
- Enucleation

== Cause ==
- Bacteria: N. meningitidis, Staphylococcus aureus, S. epidermidis, S. pneumoniae, other streptococcal spp., Cutibacterium acnes, Pseudomonas aeruginosa, other gram negative organisms.
- Viruses: Herpes simplex virus.
- Fungi: Candida spp. Fusarium.
- Parasites: Toxoplasma gondii, Toxocara.

A recent systematic review found that the most common source of infectious transmission following cataract surgery was attributed to a contaminated intraocular solution (i.e. irrigation solution, viscoelastic, or diluted antibiotic), although there is a large diversity of exogenous microorganisms that can travel via various routes including the operating room environment, phacoemulsification machine, surgical instruments, topical anesthetics, intraocular lens, autoclave solution, and cotton wool swabs.

Late-onset endophthalmitis is mostly caused by Cutibacterium acnes.

Causative organisms are not present in all cases. Endophthalmitis can emerge by entirely sterile means, e.g. an allergic reaction to a drug administered intravitreally.

Exogenous endophthalmitis is estimated to occur in 0.04 to 0.1% of all cataract surgeries and intravitreal injections. Whereas 0.9 to 10% of all penetrating eye trauma is complicated by exogenous endophthalmitis. Risk factors for the development of endophthalmitis after penetrating eye trauma include a delay (usually greater than 24 hours) in closure of the wound, metal objects being involved in the trauma, disruption of the lens and a retained foreign body in the eye. Bacillus cereus associated endophthalmitis is characterized by an especially fulminant clinical course and rapid vision loss.

Endogenous endophthalmitis is estimate to comprise 2-15% of all endophthalmitis. Diagnosis may be challenging as 30-60% of those with endogenous endophthalmitis are afebrile, with blood cultures being positive in only 30-55% of cases, and only 6% in those with candidal endophthalmitis. Fungal sources of endogenous endophthalmitis are usually seen in those who are immunocompromised, with IV drug use and central venous catheter also being important risk factors. The incidence of endophthalmitis associated with drug use has increased 4-fold from 2003 to 2016.

== Diagnosis ==
Endophthalmitis is clinically diagnosed based on signs, symptoms, eye and general examination, with the diagnosis being confirmed by intra-ocular microbiological culture (with the aqueous humour or vitreous humour extracted by vitrectomy or a vitreous or aqueous aspirate). In cases of endogenous endophthalmitis (due to endogenous sources causing bacteremia or fungemia), blood cultures may be obtained and aid in the diagnosis. 30% of infectious endophthalmitis are culture negative, with cultures more commonly being negative in fungal causes of endophthalmitis.

== Prevention ==
Different approaches have been suggested to prevent exogenous endophthalmitis after cataract surgery. Perioperative antibiotic injections into the eye, specifically cefuroxime at the end of surgery, lowers the chance of endophthalmitis. Moderate evidence also supports antibiotic eye drops (levofloxacin or chloramphenicol) with antibiotic injections (cefuroxime or penicillin) to reduce the risk of endophthalmitis after cataract surgery compared with injections or eye drops alone. Periocular injection of penicillin along with chloramphenicol-suphadimidine eye drops and an intracameral cefuroxime injection with topical levofloxacin also reduces the risk reduction of developing endophthalmitis following cataract surgery for some people.

For people undergoing intravitreal injections, antibiotics are not as effective at preventing this type of infection. Studies have demonstrated no difference between rates of infection with and without antibiotics when intravitreal injections are performed. There is evidence to suggest that a solution of povidone-iodine and antibiotics applied pre-injection may be effective at preventing some cases of endophthalmitis in people undergoing intravitreal injections.

Intravenous antibiotics given prophylactically in those with penetrating eye trauma has shown a reduction in the incidence of exogenous endophthalmitis.

== Treatment ==
Urgent medical attention is required if a person has suspected endophthalmitis. Intravitreal injection of antibiotics are indicated in bacterial endophthalmitis. Intravitreal injections of vancomycin (targeted against Gram-positive bacteria) and ceftazidime (targeting Gram-negative bacteria) are routine. Even though antibiotics can have negative impacts on the retina in high concentrations, since visual acuity worsens in 65% of endophthalmitis patients and prognosis gets poorer the longer an infection goes untreated, most medical professionals make the clinical judgment decision that immediate intervention with antibiotics is necessary. Fungal pathogens are treated with intravitreal injections of amphotericin B or voriconazole. Systemic antibiotics or anti-fungals are used in those with endogenous endophthalmitis with associated bacteremia or fungemia. People with endophthalmitis may also require an urgent surgery (pars plana vitrectomy). In some cases, evisceration may be necessary to remove a severe and intractable infection which could result in a blind and painful eye.

In people with acute endophthalmitis, combined steroid treatment with antibiotics have been found to improve visual outcomes, versus patients only treated with antibiotics, but any improvements on the resolution acute endophthalmitis is unknown.
