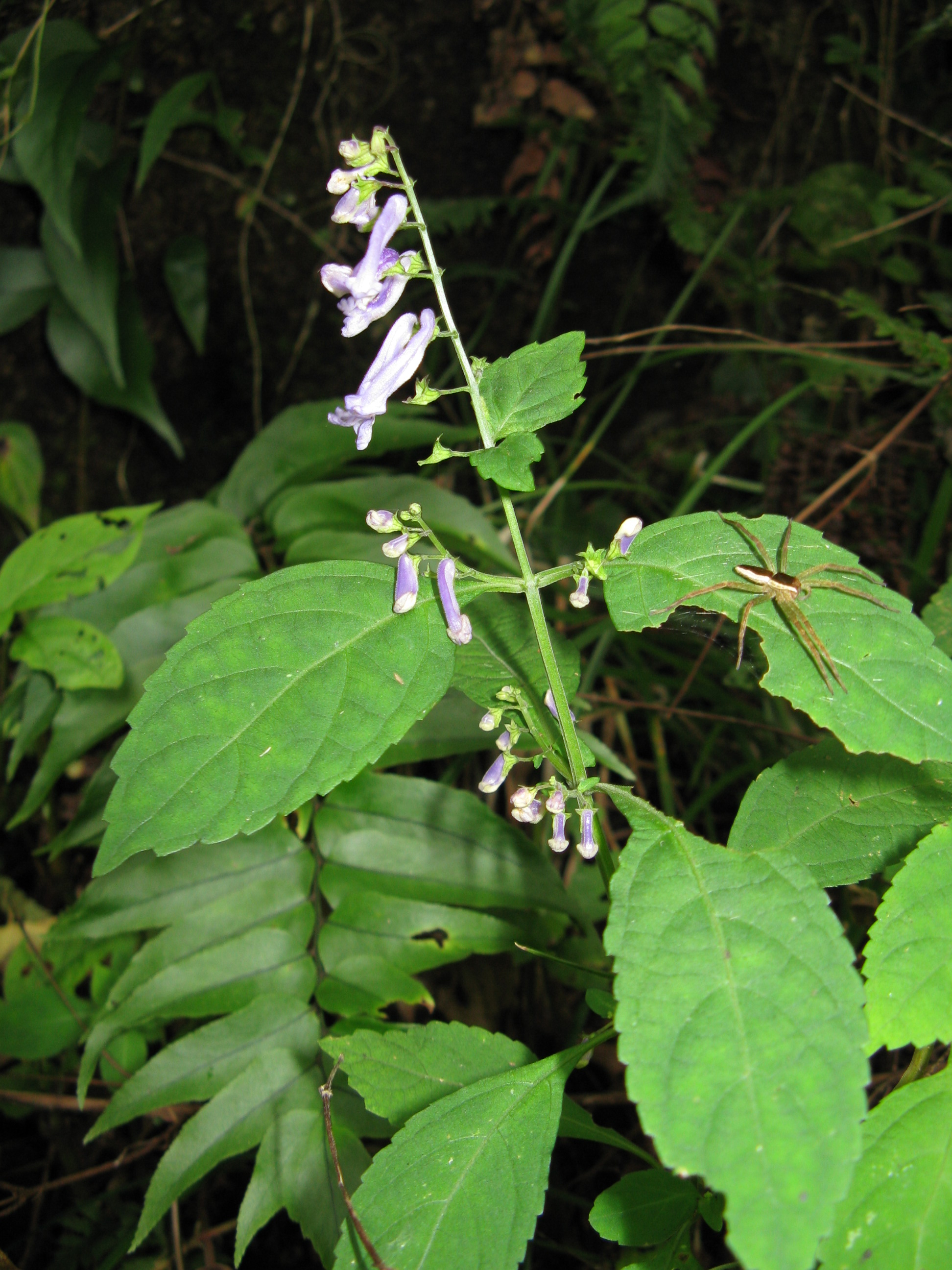
- Isodon longitubus

Scientific classification
- Kingdom: Plantae
- Clade: Tracheophytes
- Clade: Angiosperms
- Clade: Eudicots
- Clade: Asterids
- Order: Lamiales
- Family: Lamiaceae
- Subfamily: Nepetoideae
- Tribe: Ocimeae
- Genus: Isodon (Schrad. ex Benth.) Spach

Synonyms
- Plectranthus sect. Isodon Schrad. ex Benth.; Rabdosia (Blume) Hassk.; Dielsia Kudô 1929, illegitimate homonym not Gilg. 1904 (Restionaceae); Amethystanthus Nakai; Homalocheilos J.K.Morton; Skapanthus C.Y.Wu & H.W.Li

= Isodon =

Genus of flowering plants

Isodon (teacost) is a genus of flowering plants in the family Lamiaceae described in 1840. It is native to tropical and subtropical parts of the Old World, primarily Asia but two species are from Africa. Many of the species are endemic to China, where it is called xiangchacai or "fragrant tea". In China, a rapid radiation of Isodon occurred during the Pliocene that coincided with a shift from herbs inhabiting humid areas to shrubs inhabiting dry valleys.

Species

1. Isodon adenanthus - Guizhou, Sichuan, Yunnan
2. Isodon adenolomus - Sichuan, Yunnan
3. Isodon albopilosus - Sichuan
4. Isodon amethystoides - S China and Taiwan
5. Isodon angustifolius - Yunnan
6. Isodon × arakii - Japan
7. Isodon assamicus - Assam
8. Isodon atroruber - Bhutan
9. Isodon barbeyanus - Sichuan
10. Isodon brevicalcaratus - Guangdong
11. Isodon brevifolius - Yunnan
12. Isodon bulleyanus - Yunnan
13. Isodon calcicola - Yunnan
14. Isodon capillipes - Sri Lanka
15. Isodon coetsa - China, Tibet, Indian Subcontinent, Indochina, Indonesia, Philippines
16. Isodon colaniae - Laos
17. Isodon dawoensis - Sichuan
18. Isodon dhankutanus - Nepal
19. Isodon effusus - Japan
20. Isodon enanderianus - Sichuan, Yunnan
21. Isodon eriocalyx - Myanmar, Thailand, SW China
22. Isodon excisoides - Hubei, Sichuan, Yunnan
23. Isodon excisus - Primorye, Korea, Japan, NE China
24. Isodon flabelliformis - Sichuan, Yunnan
25. Isodon flavidus - Guizhou, Yunnan
26. Isodon flexicaulis - Sichuan, Yunnan
27. Isodon forrestii - Sichuan, Yunnan
28. Isodon gesneroides - Sichuan
29. Isodon gibbosus - Guizhou, Sichuan
30. Isodon glaucocalyx
31. Isodon glutinosus - Sichuan, Yunnan
32. Isodon grandifolius - Sichuan, Yunnan
33. Isodon grosseserratus - Sichuan
34. Isodon henryi - S China
35. Isodon hirtellus - Sichuan, Yunnan
36. Isodon hispidus - Bhutan, Assam, Bangladesh, Myanmar, Thailand, Yunnan, Laos
37. Isodon × inamii - Japan
38. Isodon inflexus - China, Korea, Japan
39. Isodon interruptus - Yunnan
40. Isodon irroratus - Yunnan, Tibet
41. Isodon japonicus - China, Korea, Japan, Primorye, Amur
42. Isodon kurzii - Sikkim
43. Isodon latifolius - Sichuan
44. Isodon leucophyllus - Sichuan, Yunnan
45. Isodon liangshanicus - Sichuan
46. Isodon lihsienensis - Sichuan
47. Isodon longitubus - Anhui, Zhejiang, Japan
48. Isodon lophanthoides - China, Indian Subcontinent, Indochina
49. Isodon loxothyrsus - Sichuan, Tibet, Yunnan
50. Isodon lungshengensis - Guangxi
51. Isodon macrocalyx - S China incl Taiwan
52. Isodon macrophyllus - Anhui, Jiangsu
53. Isodon medilungensis - Sichuan
54. Isodon meeboldii - Myanmar, Thailand
55. Isodon megathyrsus - Sichuan, Yunnan
56. Isodon melissoides - Arunachal Pradesh, Yunnan, Bhutan, Assam, Bangladesh
57. Isodon mucronatus - Sichuan
58. Isodon muliensis - Sichuan
59. Isodon myriocladus - Guangxi, Guangdidong, Sichuan
60. Isodon namikawanus - Nepal
61. Isodon nervosus - SE + SW China
62. Isodon nigrescens - S India, Sri Lanka
63. Isodon nilgherricus - S India
64. Isodon × ohwii - Japan
65. Isodon oreophilus - Yunnan
66. Isodon oresbius - Sichuan, Yunnan
67. Isodon pantadenius - Yunnan
68. Isodon parvifolius - Gansu, Shaanxi, Sichuan, Tibet
69. Isodon pharicus - Sichuan, Tibet, Nepal, Bhutan
70. Isodon phulchokiensis - Nepal
71. Isodon phyllopodus - Guizhou, Sichuan, Tibet, Yunnan
72. Isodon phyllostachys - Sichuan, Yunnan
73. Isodon pleiophyllus - Yunnan
74. Isodon racemosus - Hubei, Sichuan, Thailand
75. Isodon ramosissimus - tropical Africa
76. Isodon repens - Himalayas
77. Isodon rivularis - S India
78. Isodon rosthornii - Guizhou, Sichuan, Yunnan
79. Isodon rubescens - S + C China
80. Isodon rugosiformis - Yunnan
81. Isodon rugosus - Oman, Afghanistan, Pakistan, India, Tibet, Nepal, Bhutan, Bangladesh
82. Isodon schimperi - East Africa from Ethiopia to Uganda
83. Isodon scoparius - Yunnan
84. Isodon scrophularioides - Himalayas
85. Isodon sculponiatus - Himalayas, S China, Vietnam
86. Isodon secundiflorus - Sichuan
87. Isodon serra - China, Korea, Primorye
88. Isodon setschwanensis - Sichuan, Yunnan
89. Isodon shikokianus - Japan
90. Isodon silvaticus - Tibet
91. Isodon smithianus - Sichuan, Tibet
92. Isodon × suzukii - Japan
93. Isodon tenuifolius - Sichuan, Yunnan
94. Isodon ternifolius - Saudi Arabia, Himalayas, S China
95. Isodon teysmannii - Thailand, Indonesia
96. Isodon × togashii - Japan
97. Isodon trichocarpus - Japan
98. Isodon umbrosus - Japan
99. Isodon walkeri - Indian Subcontinent, Indochina, S China
100. Isodon wardii - Tibet
101. Isodon websteri - Liaoning
102. Isodon weisiensis - Yunnan
103. Isodon wightii - S India
104. Isodon wikstroemioides - Sichuan, Tibet, Yunnan
105. Isodon xerophilus - Yunnan
106. Isodon yuennanensis - Sichuan, Tibet
