= Panophthalmitis =

- Specialty: Ophthalmology
- Complications: Blindness, Sympathetic ophthalmia

Panophthalmitis is the inflammation of all parts of the eye and the area around the eye in the eye socket. It can be caused by infection, particularly from Pseudomonas species, such as Pseudomonas aeruginosa, Klebsiella species, Clostridium species, Whipple's disease, and also fungi. It can also be caused by ocular melanoma.

Panopthalmitis can also occur when infection in another part of the body spreads to the eyes, such as intra-abdominal infections or abscesses, pneumonia, endocarditis, or fungal infection. Endophthalmitis can progress to form panophthalmitis. Immediate treatment of endophthalmitis is needed, as delays in treatment may progress to panophthalmitis.

A limited case series of 18 patients with panophthalmitis showed that antibiotics and steroids injected into the eyeball and tissues surrounding the eye effectively prevented the need to remove the eye.

A potential complication of panophthalmitis is sympathetic ophthalmia in which inflammation occurs in both eyes, including the unaffected eye, which may lead to blindness.
