= Pathogenic fungus =

Type of Fungi that causes diseases

Pathogenic fungi are fungi that cause disease in humans or other organisms. Although fungi are eukaryotic, many pathogenic fungi are microorganisms. Approximately 300 fungi are pathogenic to humans; their study is called "medical mycology". Fungal infections are estimated to kill more people than either tuberculosis or malaria—about two million people per year.

== Classification ==
Human pathogenic fungi do not form a single taxonomic group but are distributed across multiple fungal lineages. They are commonly classified by shared morphological and biological characterstics, including yeasts, thermally dimorphic fungi, and other groups. Although these fungi differ considerably in ecology and life cycle, each has evolved the capacity to colonize human tissues and cause disease.

== Yeasts ==
Yeasts are unicellular fungi that reproduce primarily by budding or fission and make up many clinically significant fungal pathogens. Several yeast genera are members of the normal human microbiota or are widely distributed in the environment, but may act as opportunistic pathogens when host defenses are impaired.

=== Candida ===
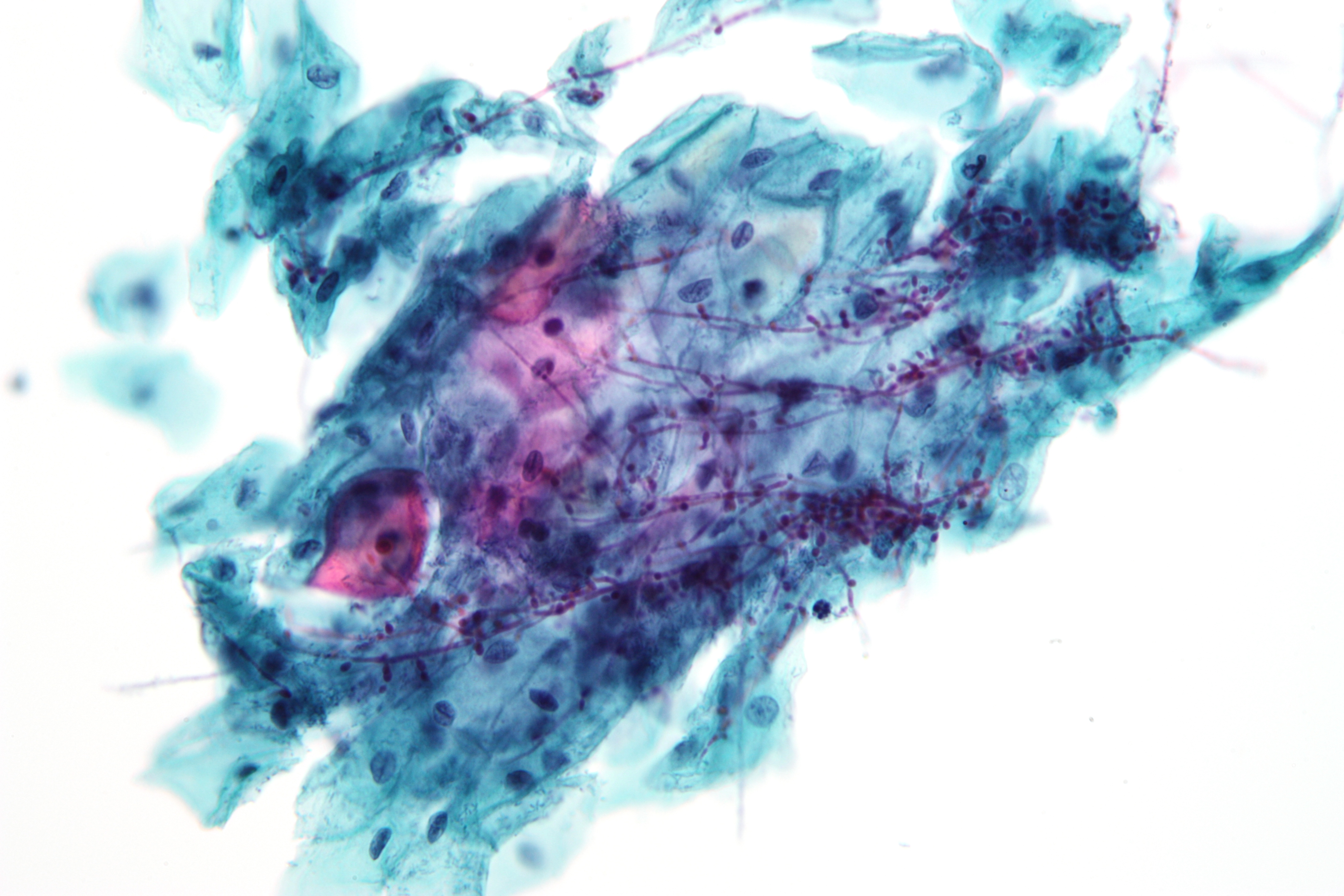
Candida. Pap test specimen. Pap stain.

Candida species cause infections in individuals with deficient immune systems. Candida species tend to be the culprit of most fungal infections and can cause both systemic and superficial infection.

Candida albicans is a kind of diploid yeast that commonly occurs among the human gut microflora. C. albicans is an opportunistic pathogen in humans. Abnormal over-growth of this fungus can occur, particularly in immunocompromised individuals. C. albicans has a parasexual cycle that appears to be stimulated by environmental stress.

C. auris, first described in 2009, is resistant to many frontline antifungal drugs, disinfectants, and heat, which makes it extremely difficult to eradicate. Like many fungal pathogens it mostly affects immunocompromised people; if in the blood or other organs and tissues, mortality is about 50%.

Other species of Candida may be pathogenic as well, including Candida stellatoidea, C. tropicalis, C. pseudotropicalis, C. krusei, C. parapsilosis, and C. guilliermondii.

=== Cryptococcus ===
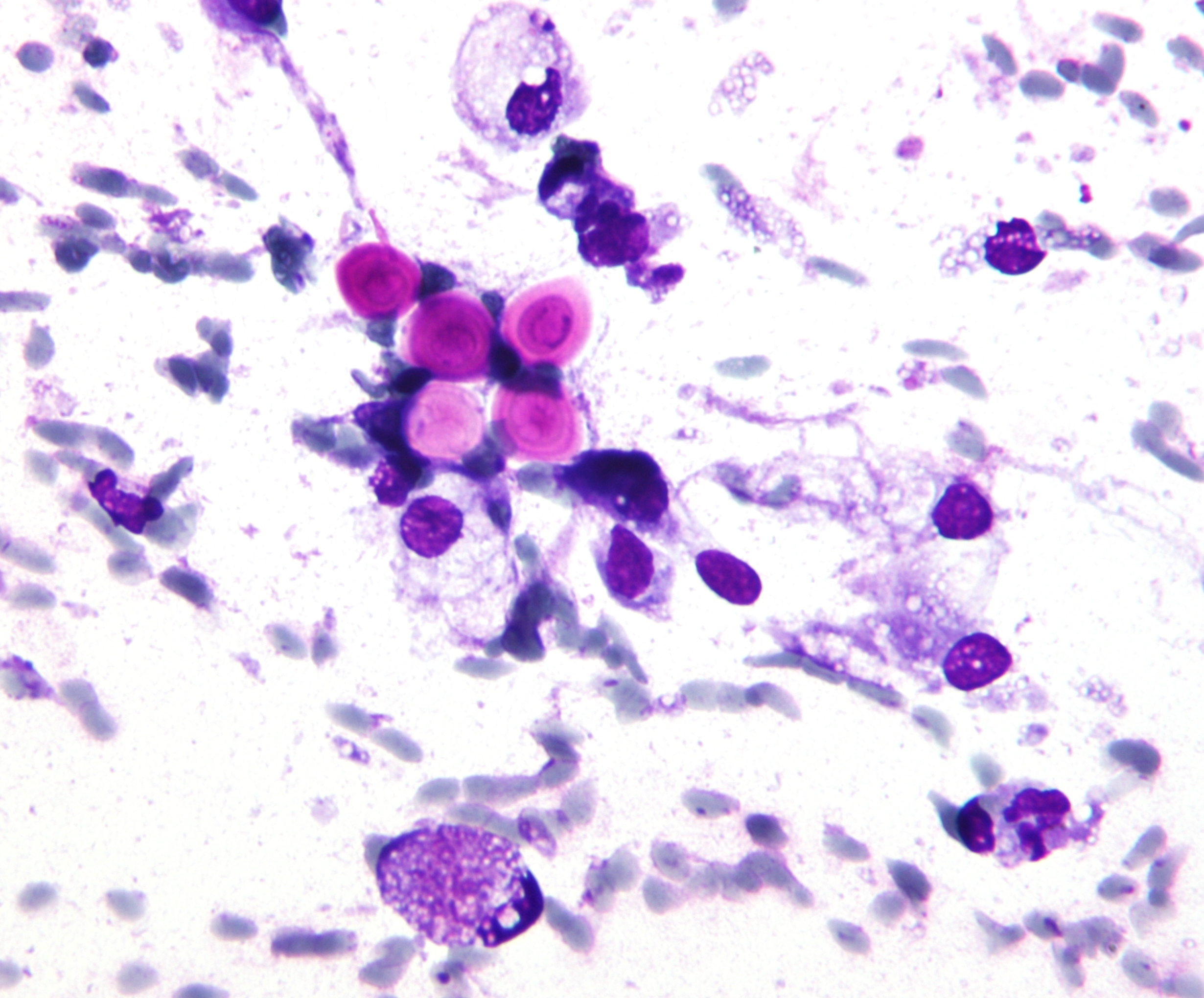
Cryptococcus. FNA specimen. Field stain.

Cryptococcus neoformans can cause a severe form of meningitis and meningo-encephalitis in patients with HIV infection and AIDS. The majority of Cryptococcus species live in the soil and do not cause disease in humans. Cryptococcus neoformans is the major human and animal pathogen. Papiliotrema laurentii and Naganishia albida, both formerly referred to Cryptococcus, have been known to occasionally cause moderate-to-severe disease in human patients with compromised immunity. Cryptococcus gattii is endemic to tropical parts of the continent of Africa and Australia and can cause disease in non-immunocompromised people.

Infecting C. neoformans cells are usually phagocytosed by alveolar macrophages in the lung. The invading C. neoformans cells may be killed by the release of oxidative and nitrosative molecules by these macrophages. However some C. neoformans cells may survive within the macrophages. The ability of the pathogen to survive within the macrophages probably determines latency of the disease, dissemination and resistance to antifungal agents. In order to survive in the hostile intracellular environment of the macrophage, one of the responses of C. neoformans is to upregulate genes employed in responses to oxidative stress.

The haploid nuclei of C. neoformans can undergo nuclear fusion (karyogamy) to become diploid. These diploid nuclei may then undergo meiosis, including recombination, resulting in the formation of haploid basidiospores that are able to disperse. Meiosis may facilitate repair of C. neoformans DNA in response to macrophage challenge.

== Thermally dimorphic fungi ==
Thermally dimorphic fungi are a group of pathogenic fungi that grow as filamentous molds in the environment but convert to a yeast or yeast-like form at mammalian body temperature following infection. Most are acquired through inhalation of airborne conidia from soil or other environmental reservoirs, producing a primary pulmonary infection that may disseminate to other organs. Several thermally dimorphic fungi are endemic to specific geographic regions and are capable of causing disease in both immunocompetent and immunocompromised individuals.

=== Histoplasma ===
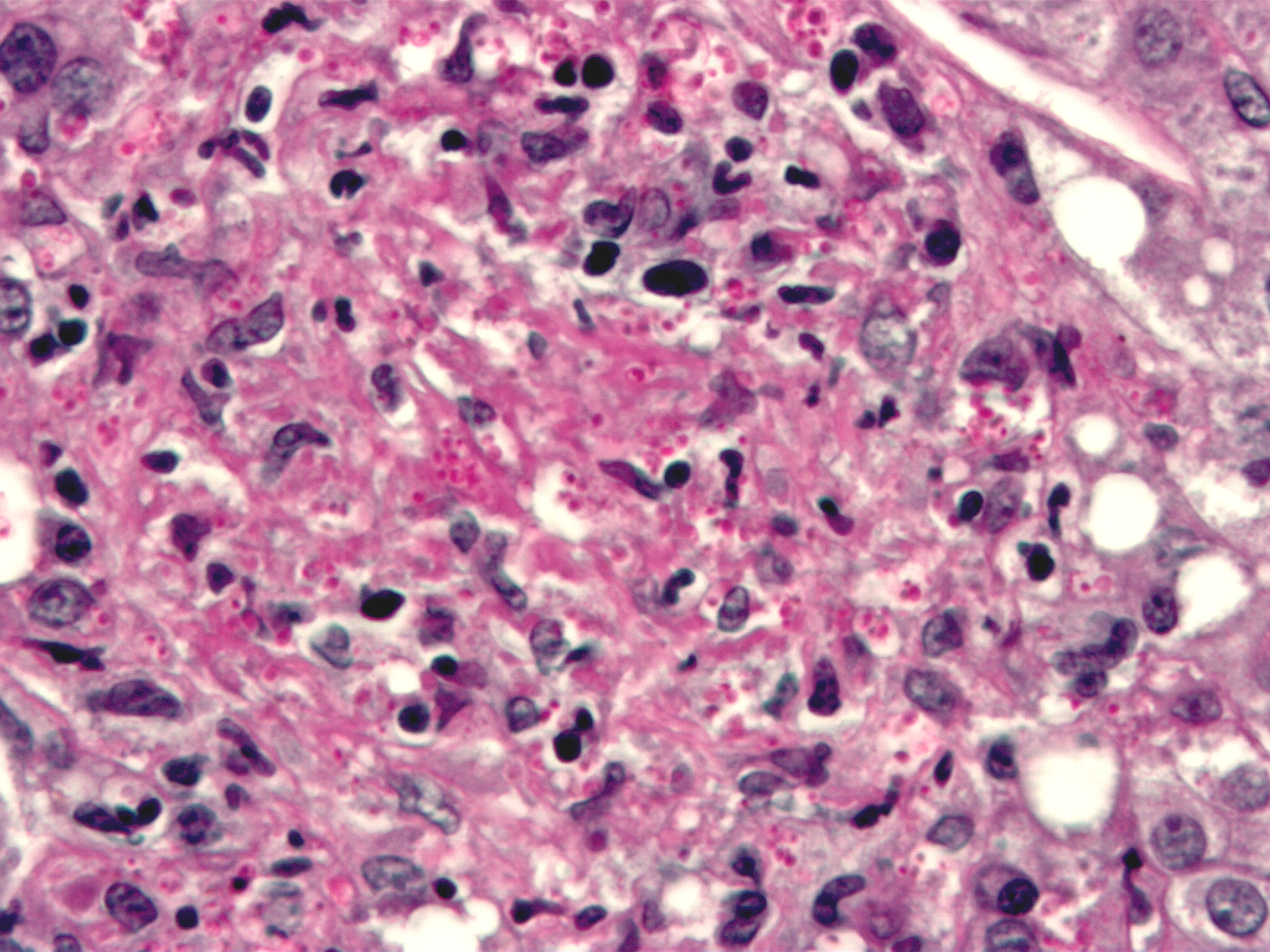
Histoplasmosis. PASD stain.

Histoplasma capsulatum can cause histoplasmosis in humans, dogs and cats. The fungus is most prevalent in the Americas, India and southeastern Asia. It is endemic in certain areas of the United States.

Histoplasma are found primarily in soil enriched with bird or bat droppings, where they grow as filamentous molds and produce infectious conidia. Infection occurs through inhalation of airborne conidia, resulting in a primary pulmonary infection. Severity of disease is associated with inoculum size and immunologic status of the host. Numerous cases of histoplasmosis have been reported in people who handle birds or work in areas that serve as roosting places for birds. Spelunkers are also commonly exposed to the fungus when it is aerosolized from bat guano in caves.

=== Coccidioides ===
Species of Coccidioides are the etiologic agents of coccidiomycosis, also known as Valley fever. Human disease is caused by Coccidioides immitis and Coccidioides posadasii. These fungi are endemic to arid regions of the Western hemisphere, where they grow in soil and produce infectious arthroconidia that become airborne when the soil is disturbed.

Following inhalation, the arthroconidia develop into distinctive spherules containing numerous endospores rather than yeast cells, making Coccidioides unique among the thermally dimorphic fungi. While most infections are asymptomatic, or limited to a mild respiratory illness, pulmonary complications and disseminated disease involving the skin, bones, joints, or central nervous system may occur.

=== Blastomyces ===
Blastomyces dermatitidis is the etiologic agent of blastomycosis, an endemic mycosis acquired through inhalation of environmental conidia. B. dermatitidis is endemic to the Ohio and Mississippi river valleys of the United States. Asymptomatic infection occurs in about 50% of infected individuals. Dissemination of the fungi results in extrapulmonary disease, which most commonly involves the skin.

=== Paracoccidioides ===
Fungal species from the genus Paracoccidioides can cause paracoccidioidmycosis, a systemic mycosis endemic to Latin America. The principal pathogens are Paracoccidioides brasiliensis and Paracoccidioides lutzii. Paracoccidioides is found in the soil and transmission occurs through inhalation.

=== Talaromyces ===
Although most species of Talaromyces are environmental saprobes, Talaromyces marneffei (previously Penicillium marneffei) is a thermally dimorphic opportunistic pathogen.

=== Sporothrix ===
Species from the genus Sporothrix are common environmental saprophytes found in the soil and on decaying plant matter. Unlike most thermally dimorphic fungi, which are typically transmitted through inhalational exposure, Sporothrix are introduced through traumatic inoculation. Species from the Sporothrix schenckii complex are the principal pathogenic species and the disease they cause in humans is known as sporotrichosis (or rose gardener's disease).

== Mucorales ==
Molds of the order Mucorales are fast-growing environmental fungi that cause mucormycosis, a rapidly progressive invasive infection characterized by angioinvasion, tissue necrosis, and high mortality.

== Aspergillus ==
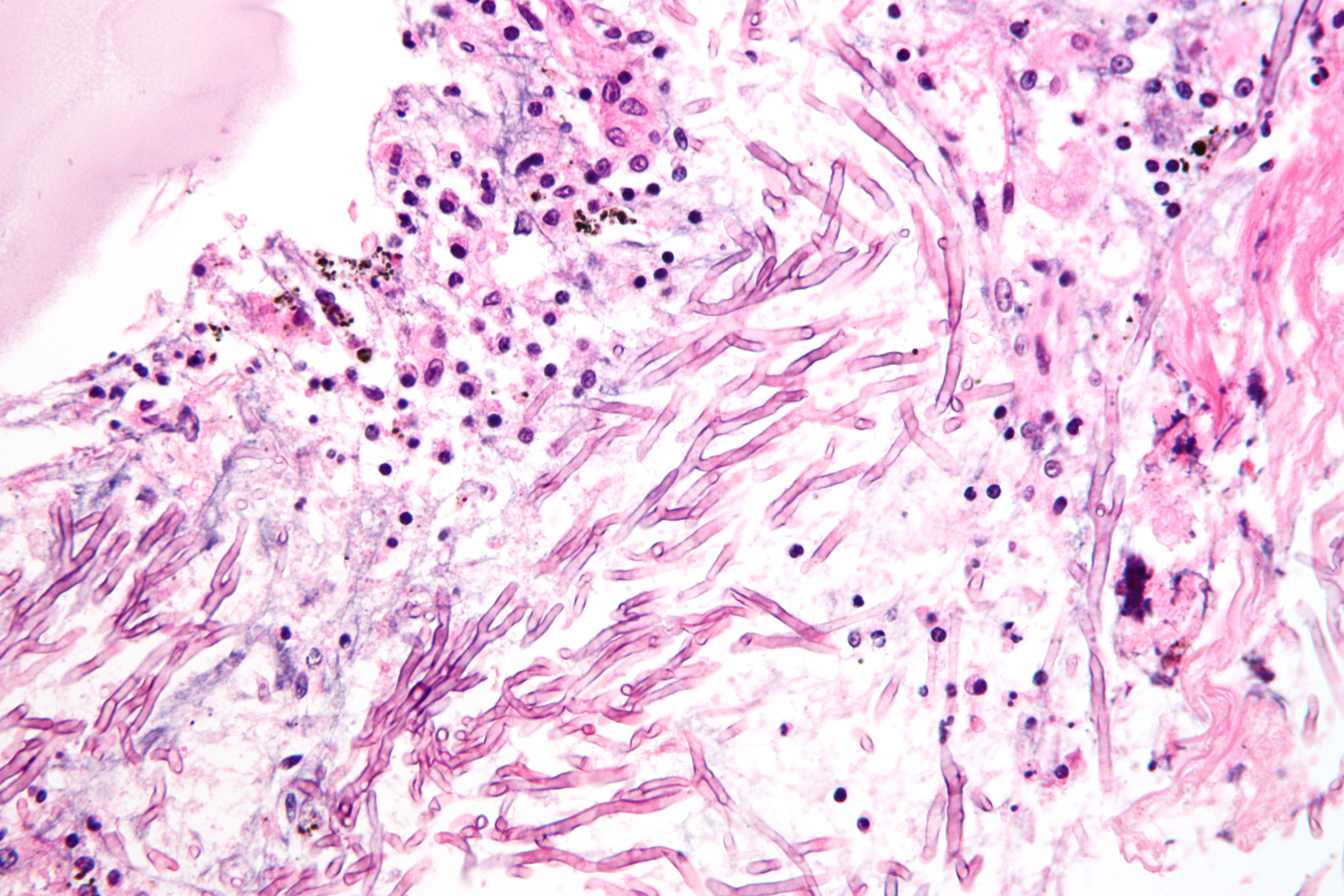
Aspergillosis. H&E stain.

The most common pathogenic species are Aspergillus fumigatus and Aspergillus flavus. Aspergillus flavus produces aflatoxin which is both a toxin and a carcinogen and which can potentially contaminate foods such as nuts. Aspergillus fumigatus and Aspergillus clavatus can cause allergic disease. Some Aspergillus species cause disease on grain crops, especially maize, and synthesize mycotoxins including aflatoxin. Aspergillosis is the group of diseases caused by Aspergillus. The symptoms include fever, cough, chest pain or breathlessness. Usually, only patients with weakened immune systems or with other lung conditions are susceptible.

The spores of Aspergillus fumigatus are ubiquitous in the atmosphere. A. fumigatus is an opportunistic pathogen. It can cause potentially lethal invasive infection in immunocompromised individuals. A. fumigatus has a fully functional sexual cycle that produces cleistothecia and ascospores.

== Dermatophytes ==
Dermatophytes are a group of fungi that are highly adapted to colonizing keratinized tissue in humans and animals. Fungal structures produced by dermatophytes include macroconidia, microconidia, and arthroconidia (infectious hyphal fragments. Dermatophyte infections are initiated with arthroconidia adhere to keratinized tissues. The most common dermatophytes to infect humans are Trichophyton, Microsporum, and Epidermophyton.

== Pneumocystis ==
Pneumocystis jirovecii (previously known as Pneumocystis carinii) can cause a form of pneumonia in people with weakened immune systems, such as premature children, patients on immunosuppressive treatment, the elderly and AIDS patients.

== Stachybotrys ==
Stachybotrys chartarum or "black mold" can cause respiratory damage and severe headaches. It frequently occurs in houses and in regions that are chronically damp.

== Pathogens of particular concern ==
n 2022 the World Health Organization (WHO) published a list of fungal pathogens which should be a priority for public health action. According to the World Health Organization (WHO) in 2022 pathogens of particular concern are:

Critical priority
Cryptococcus neoformans, Candida auris, Aspergillus fumigatus, Candida albicans.
High priority
Nakaseomyces glabrata (Candida glabrata), Histoplasma spp., eumycetoma causative agents, Mucorales, Fusarium spp., Candida tropicalis, Candida parapsilosis.
Medium priority
Scedosporium spp., Lomentospora prolificans, Coccidioides spp., Pichia kudriavzeveii (Candida krusei), Cryptococcus gattii, Talaromyces marneffei, Pneumocystis jirovecii, Paracoccidioides spp.

== Host defense mechanisms ==
=== Endothermy ===
Mammalian endothermy and homeothermy are potent nonspecific defenses against most fungi. A comparative genomic study found that in opportunistic fungi there are few if any specialised virulence traits consistently linked to opportunistic pathogenicity of fungi in humans apart from the ability to grow at 37 °C.

=== Barrier tissues ===
The skin, respiratory tract, gastrointestinal tract, and the genital-urinary tract induced inflammation are common bodily regions of fungal infection.

=== Immune response ===
Studies have shown that hosts with higher levels of immune response cells such as monocytes/macrophages, dendritic cells, and invariant natural killer (iNK) T-cells exhibited greater control of fungal growth and protection against systemic infection. Pattern recognition receptors (PRRs) play an important role in inducing an immune response by recognizing specific fungal pathogens and initiating an immune response. In the case of mucosal candidiasis, the cells that produce cytokine IL-17 are extremely important in maintaining innate immunity. Th1-type cell-mediated immunity (CMI) is required for clearance of a fungal infection.

== Link to extremotolerance ==
A comprehensive comparison of distribution of opportunistic pathogens and stress-tolerant fungi in the fungal tree of life showed that polyextremotolerance and opportunistic pathogenicity consistently appear in the same fungal orders and that the co-occurrence of opportunism and extremotolerance (e.g. osmotolerance and psychrotolerance) is statistically significant. This suggests that some adaptations to stressful environments may also promote fungal survival during the infection.

== Fungal pathogens of plants ==
Markedly more fungi are pathogenic to plant life than those of the animal kingdom. The study of fungi and other organisms pathogenic to plants is called plant pathology.

== See also ==
- List of human diseases associated with infectious pathogens
- Microbiology
- Microsporidia
- Mycology
- Plant pathology
