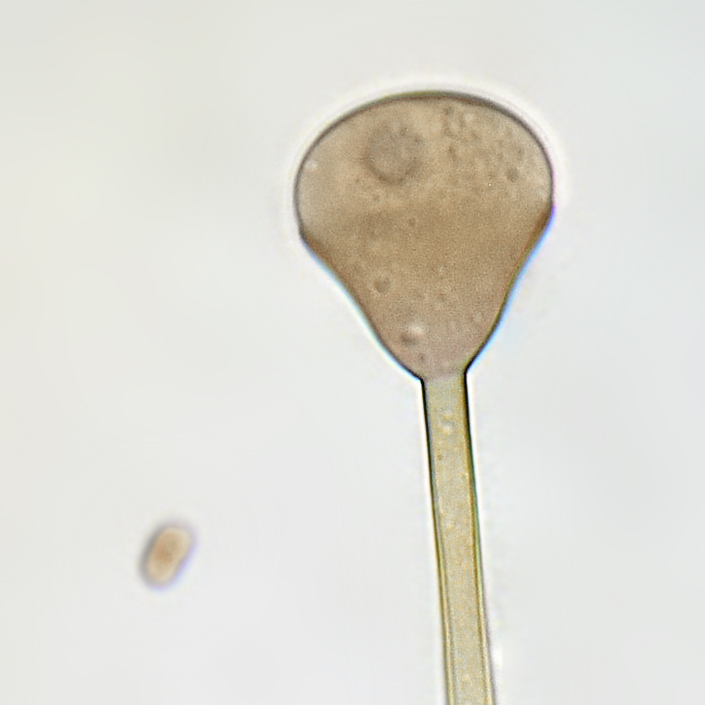

Scientific classification
- Kingdom: Fungi
- Division: Mucoromycota
- Class: Mucoromycetes
- Order: Mucorales
- Family: Saksenaeaceae
- Genus: Apophysomyces
- Species: A. variabilis

Binomial name
- Apophysomyces variabilis E.Àlvarez, Stchigel, Cano, D.A.Sutton & Guarro (2010)

= Apophysomyces variabilis =

Species of fungus

Apophysomyces variabilis is an emerging fungal pathogen that can cause serious and sometimes fatal infection in humans. This fungus is a soil-dwelling saprobe with tropical to subtropical distribution. It is a zygomycete that causes mucormycosis, an infection in humans brought about by fungi in the order Mucorales. Infectious cases have been reported globally in locations including the Americas, Southeast Asia, India, and Australia. Apophysomyces variabilis infections are not transmissible from person to person.

Apophysomyces variabilis is one of four species in the genus Apophysomyces, which also includes A. elegans, A. ossiformis, and A. trapeziformis. In the past, Apophysomyces elegans was believed to be the species responsible for most cases of cutaneous mucormycosis attributed to Apophysomyces, but recently, some of the other species have been shown to be important in human infection. Since the new species have only recently been recognized, much remains to be learned about their relative clinical importance, comparative virulence, epidemiology, and anti-fungal drug susceptibilities.

== History ==
Apophysomyces variabilis (CBS 658.93; FMR 10381) was first identified by Alvarez et al. in 2010 from a human osteomyelitis patient in the Netherlands Antilles. The genus Apophysomyces was first published in 1979 by Misra et al. who isolated A. elegans from soil in northern India. Apophysomyces variabilis was considered to be the same species as Apophysomyces elegans until September 2012 when Alvarez et al. determined that 16 strains of A. elegans were actually a complex of species in the genus Apophysomyces. Based on genetic, physiological, and morphological analyses, the authors concluded that the sixteen environmental and clinical strains of A. elegans could be divided in four clades corresponding to the species; A. elegans, A. trapeziformis, A. ossiformis, and A. variabilis. The species were differentiated based on the sporangiospore shape, sporangiophore type, and apophyseal shape. As well, carbon fixation ability aided in species differentiation with only A. elegans strains being able to assimilate the glycoside esculin. Alvarez et al. analysed three loci: the H3 gene, the internal transcribed spacer (ITS) regions of the nuclear rRNA gene, and the D1 and D2 domains of the 28S rRNA gene. This analysis resulted in a phylogeny containing the four clades. None of the disease strains that had been identified as "A. elegans" clustered with taxonomically important strains of A. elegans in molecular phylogenetic analyses. Accordingly, the role of A. elegans (in the strict sense) as a human pathogen may warrant reconsideration.

== Ecology ==
Apopysomyces variabilis is a soil fungus found in tropical and subtropical regions. Though the majority of A. variabilis infections have been reported from India, the fungus has also been found in North and South America, Australia, and Southeast Asia. Apophysomyces variabilis is thermotolerant and grows optimally at 35–42 °C. It cannot grow at or above 50 °C. The minimum temperature for growth is 15 °C.

== Morphology ==
Apophysomyces variabilis resembles the other three members of the genus Apophysomyces but is characterized by the variable appearance of its sporangiospores and sporangiophores which range from club-shaped to trapezoidal to flattened spheres. The sporangiophore can measure up to 400 μm in length and has a funnel-shaped apophysis or swelling below the columella. Hyphae are smooth-walled, aseptate, and branched.

== Growth and reproduction ==
Unlike most members of the Mucorales, Apophysomyces species often fail to sporulate under standard clinical laboratory culture conditions. These fungi require Czapek's agar (CZA), a nutrient-defined medium. Colonies grow rapidly at 37 °C on CZA and initially appear white and woolly becoming greyish brown with age. Colonies are grey and floccose, will grow on the lid of the petri dish, and are colourless on reverse. Sporangiosphores are unbranched, smooth-walled, and light brown. Sporangia are apophyseal, pyriform, beginning as whitish and turning brown with maturity. Sporangiospores are variable in size and shape. Sexuality has not been observed in A. variabilis.

== Disease in humans ==
Mucormycosis is commonly contracted via inhalation of spores resulting in rhinocerebral and pulmonary mucormycoses but infection with Apophysomyces variabilis is contracted cutaneously. Apophysomyces species cause infections of the skin and soft-tissue following injuries such as burns, automotive accidents, surgeries, and injections both intramuscular and subcutaneous. Cutaneous mucormycosis is acquired when the sporangiospores from contaminated soil and water come into contact with broken skin. For this reason, disease is seen in burn patients, injured persons, and injection-drug users. The infection may take clinical forms such as necrotizing fasciitis, cerebritis, rhinoorbital infections, and kidney infections. Successful treatment depends on early detection of infection, surgical debridement of necrotic tissues, and anti-fungal therapy with drugs such as posaconazole and amphotericin B. Members of the order Mucorales generally infect immunocompromised patients but A. variabilis infections tend to occur in immunocompetent healthy hosts.

Necrotic lesions are caused by invasion of blood vessels leading to thrombosis and infarction. Though uncommon, cutaneous infections can become disseminated infections. Lesions extend into muscle, tendon, bone, and ultimately spread by the bloodstream to other organs. The brain is the most common site of secondary infection but necrotic lesions may also form in the spleen and heart.

== Risk factors for infection ==
Any penetrating injury that breaks the skin barrier including; burns, injections, intravenous catheterization, and surgical wounds creates risk for developing mucormycosis. These types of situations, in combination with exposure to contaminated material, create opportunity for infection. In many cases of cutaneous mucormycosis, there exists no underlying medical condition.

There is elevated risk for developing mucormycosis in diabetic individuals. Patients with uncontrolled diabetes may develop diabetic ketoacidosis. This condition results in an acidic pH which makes serum iron more available, permitting the growth of Mucorales.

== Laboratory detection ==
Tissue samples from necrotic lesions are examined by microscopy. The presence of aseptate branched hyphae in tissue is a hallmark of mucormycosis. Normally, culture of material from a biopsied lesion is used to recover and identify members of the Mucorales although blood cultures are often negative for these fungi. Cultures may be sterile despite clearing visible fungi in histological preparations. This may be due to hyphae becoming damaged during biopsy or ground up during laboratory procedures making growth in culture very difficult. Unlike many members of the Mucorales, species of Apophysomyces are often slow to sporulate, further complicating rapid culture-based identification. Definitive identification of A. variabilis requires phenotypic and genotypic analysis. Most modern case reports of A. variabilis infection have confirmed identifications against known strains by sequence similarity.

== Treatment ==
Amphotericin B is the most potent antifungal drug available to treat mucormycosis. When given intravenously in the deoxycholate form, amphotericin B is associated with toxic side effects. For this reason, it is often replaced with liposomal amphotericin B, a lipid-based formulation with fewer adverse side effects. Treatment of A. variabilis infections usually involves aggressive antifungal therapy and often surgical removal of necrotic tissue. In mouse models of infection, posaconazole has shown efficacy both in vivo and in vitro. Amphotericin B may also be used to reduce fungal load. In the mouse study, both drugs decreased the amount of hyphae in infected tissues but posaconazole had better survival outcomes than amphotericin B.

In vitro antifungal susceptibility tests of the entire genus Apophysomyces have revealed that amphotericin B and posaconazole are the most effective against A. variabilis infections when compared to itraconazole, ravuconazole, and voriconazole. Testing data has also showed that caspofungin and anidulafungin are inactive antifungal agents against all strains of the genus Apophysomyces.

== Epidemiology ==
Infections from these species are rare. In the United States, for example, the Apophysomyces species complex represents 0.5% of Mucorales isolates from clinical samples. The incidence of mucormycoses due to Apophysomyces is unknown and extent of infection remains uncertain. This is mainly due to the lack of properly preserved isolates from clinical cases and the necessity of genetic analyses for species determination.
