= Loboa =

Loboa may refer to:

- Eisner Loboa (born 1987), Mexican footballer
- Elizabeth G. Loboa, American engineering academic
- Loboa loboi, former name of fungus Lacazia loboi
