= Saksenaea vasiformis =

Scientific classification
- Kingdom: Fungi
- Division: Mucoromycota
- Class: Mucoromycetes
- Order: Mucorales
- Family: Saksenaeaceae
- Genus: Saksenaea
- Species: S. vasiformis

Binomial name
- Saksenaea vasiformis S.B.Saksena (1953)

Species of fungus

Saksenaea vasiformis is an infectious fungus associated with cutaneous or subcutaneous lesions following trauma. It causes opportunistic infections as the entry of the fungus is through open spaces of cutaneous barrier ranging in severity from mild to severe or fatal. It lives in soils worldwide, but is considered as a rare human pathogen since only 38 cases were reported as of 2012. Saksenaea vasiformis usually fails to sporulate on the routine culture media, creating a challenge for early diagnosis, which is essential for a good prognosis. Infections are usually treated using a combination of amphotericin B and surgery. Saksenaea vasiformis is one of the few fungi known to cause necrotizing fasciitis or "flesh-eating disease".

== Description ==
Saksenaea vasiformis was initially described as a new mucoraceous fungus in a new genus Saksenaea in 1953 by Dr. S. B. Saksena. It was isolated from Patharia forest soil in India and distinguishably different from other species in morphology of sporangia (flask-shaped) and the method of spore discharge. The name "vasiformis" came from the flask-shape of sporangiophore. Since 1953, it has been isolated from various countries including Panama, Israel, Honduras, and the southern United States. This species is the only species belong to genus Saksenaea, although two new species, which are Saksenaea oblongispora and Saksenaea erythrospora, were proposed in 2010. Detailed microscopic observation displayed similar flask shape of sporangiophores and the phylogenic analysis indicated that these isolates (S. vasiformis, S. oblongispora and S. erythrospora) belong to the same genus Saksenaea.

This species is associated with Apophysomyces elegans, a member of family Mucoraceae. Despite the significant differences of morphological characteristics of sporangia and the manner of sporangium formation, these two species are associated, usually in medical literature, due to similar disease manifestation in human: cutaneous or subcutaneous infections. Infections involving these two species (S. vasiformis and A. elegans) cause rapid necrotizing vasculitis that leads to thrombosis and tissue necrosis in organisms’ vascular lumen.

=== Cultural characteristics ===
Saksenaea vasiformis very rapidly grows in growth media, producing sterile hyphae. Induction of sporulation is difficult with routine fungal media used in the most of clinical laboratories, but it can be stimulated to sporulate rapidly (5 to 7 days) by incubating the yeast-malt-dextrose agar at 32 °C. The identification of this species is not problematic after sporulation event because of its characteristic flask-shaped sporangium with spherical venter and a distinct dome-shped columella and dichotomously branched rhizoid complex. On top of the venter, there is a neck with closed apex with a mucilaginous plug. Inside of the neck are the sporangiophores, which are liberated by the dissolution of the mucilaginous plug.

== Pathogenesis ==
Saksenaea vasiformis is normally present in soil and does not cause human infection unless it is introduced to the open site where the cutaneous barrier no longer exists. This is why this species causes an opportunistic infection following a traumatic event that breaks the cutaneous barrier. Infections were reported in the United States, Australia, Norway, New Zealand, Spain, India, French Guiana, France, India and Greece. The first human infection by S. vasiformis was reported in 1976 in a 19-year-old male with cranial and facial wounds incurred during an automobile accident.

Saksenaea vasiformis usually causes cutaneous or subcutaneous zygomycosis, but can also cause primary sinusitis and rhinocerebral disease. Cutaneous diseases by S. vasiformis present red blisters. with necrotic ulcers or raised red to purple lesions. Infections by S. vasiformis are normally localized and indolent, but in some cases infection is disseminated or becomes highly invasive, and these cases were all fatal.

Early diagnosis is the key to survival of the patients, but the diagnosis of the disease is hard due to difficulties in stimulating sporulation. Furthermore, there has been only 38 cases of infections reported as of 2012 and the author of the paper suggested that low number of cases reported can be due to lack of awareness of this species in clinical environment, high mortality rate, and largely, microbiological and clinical bias resulted from difficulties in stimulating sporulation of this species. To ease the identification of fungus producing sterile mycelium such as S. vasiformis and A. elegans, exoantigen test has been developed. For S. vasiformis, even though exoantigen testing is helpful with positive test, it is rarely used because of the high false-negative rate, requiring confirmation by sporulating morphology with all the negative tests. — see cultural characteristics.

Human hosts are usually immunocompetent with open lesion that acts as a portal entry of the fungus into the body. There has been some reported cases of immunocompromised hosts due to steroid treatment, antibiotic therapy, and compromised immune system due to underlying disease is also known as a risk factor. For example, S. vasiformis infection has been seen in some patients with preleukemia, bladder cancer and diabetes mellitus. Moreover, S. vasiformis causes infections in bovines and cetaceans such as bottlenose dolphins, killer whales, and Pacific White-sided dolphins in with A. elegans.

== Treatment ==
Infections by S. vasiformis are mainly treated with drug amphotericin B because this species is resistant to many antifungal agents. The side effect of amphotericin B is renal toxicity, but the chances of side effect can be reduced by administering amphotericin B in incremental doses to reach maximum daily dose of 0.5 to 0.75 mg/kg. Furthermore, amphotericin B deoxycholate is more nephrotoxic than liposomal amphotericin B; due to the expense of liposomal amphotericin B, many of the patients were unable to afford this therapy, resulting in fatal outcome. In addition, another antifungal agent, posaconazole, was able to successfully treat disseminated infection by S. vasiformis in vitro, suggesting that it could be used as an alternative to amphotericin B for the treatment of the infections.

Along with the drug treatment, patients are recommended to receive an aggressive surgical debridement or an amputation in some severe cases. This is an important for the infection to be treated efficiently and effectively because necrotic tissues may act as a barrier to penetration of drug to the site of infection.

It is essential to treat infections appropriately and as soon as possible to decrease the mortality rate as mortality rate of untreated cases is almost 100% and that of properly treated cutaneous diseases is only around 10%.
