= Reeta Rao =

American biologist

Reeta Prusty Rao is an American biologist who researches fungal diseases. She is chair of the department of biology and biotechnology at Worcester Polytechnic Institute.

== Life ==
Rao earned a Ph.D. from Pennsylvania State University in 1999. She completed postdoctoral research at the Whitehead Institute in 2005.

Rao is a biologist who researches emerging infectious diseases with a focus on fungal diseases. She joined Worcester Polytechnic Institute in 2004 and became chair of its department of biology and biotechnology in 2022. Rao was elected a fellow of the American Academy of Microbiology and the American Association for the Advancement of Science in 2018 and 2022 respectively.
