= Lobomycosis =

Lobo's disease
- Other names: Lobo disease, Jorge Lobo's disease, Lacaziosis, keloidal blastomycosis
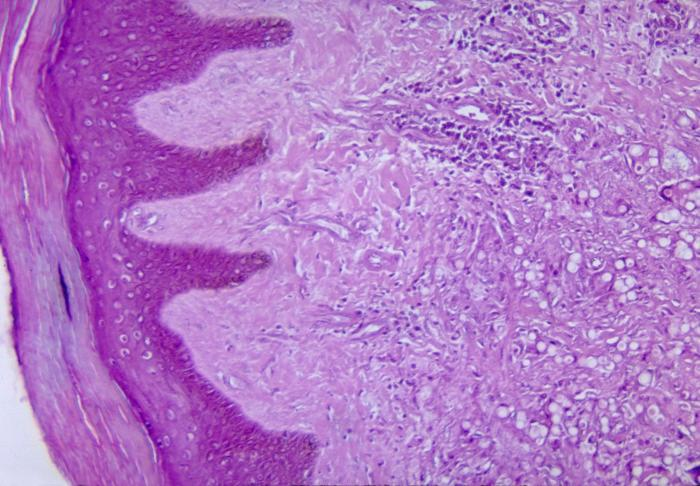
- Histopathological changes in the skin seen in lobomycosis. Source: CDC
- Specialty: Infectious diseases
- Causes: Lacazia loboi

Lobomycosis is a fungal infection of the skin. It usually presents with bumps in the skin, firm swellings, deep skin lesions, or malignant tumors.

It is caused by Lacazia loboi (formerly named Loboa loboi). Transmission is generally by direct contact with contaminated water, soil, vegetation, or by direct contact with an infected dolphin.

Diagnosis is by identifying Lacazia laboi in a lesion.

This disease is usually found in humans and bottlenose dolphins, with the possible risk of transmission from one species to the other.

It was discovered by Brazilian dermatologist Jorge Lobo. Other names which were given to the disease are: keloidal blastomycosis, Amazonian blastomycosis, blastomycoid granuloma, miraip and piraip. These last two names were given by natives of the Amazon and mean that which burns.

== Signs and symptoms ==
The disease is endemic in rural regions in South America and Central America. Infection most commonly develops after minor scratches or insect bites, but many patients cannot recall any skin trauma. Human-to-human transmission does not occur, and the disease is only acquired from the environment. The disease manifests as chronic keloidal nodular lesions on the ears, legs, or arms.

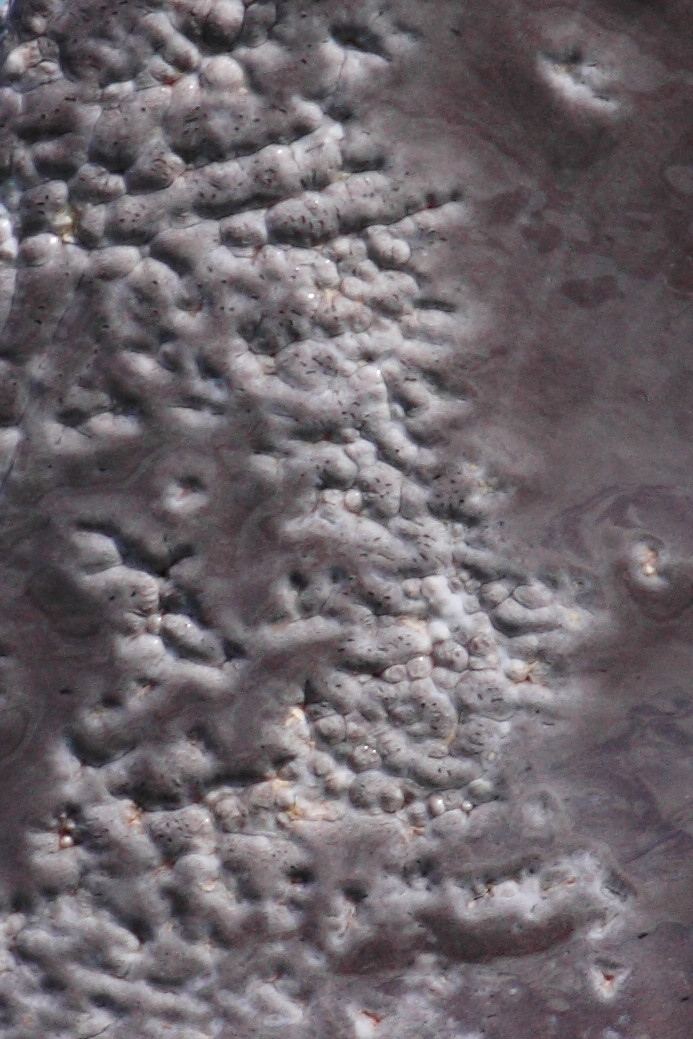
Lobomycosis lesions on the skin of a bottlenosed dolphin

Diagnosis of Lobo's disease is made by taking a sample of the infected skin (a skin biopsy) and examining it under the microscope. Lacazia loboi is characterized by long chains of spherical cells interconnected by tubules. The cells appear to be yeast-like with a diameter of 5 to 12 μm. Attempts to culture L. loboi have so far been unsuccessful.

== Diagnosis ==
=== Differential diagnosis ===
The disease is often misdiagnosed as Blastomyces dermatitidis or Paracoccidiodes brasiliensis due to its similar morphology.

== Treatment ==
Surgical excision or cryosurgery is the treatment of choice. Treatment with antifungals has been considered ineffective, but the use of clofazimine and dapsone in patients with leprosy and lobomycosis has been found to improve the latter. This treatment regimen, with concomitant itraconazole, has been used to prevent recurrence after surgery.

== Other animals ==
Lesions in dolphins occur on the dorsal fin, head, flukes, and peduncle. In January 2006, a potential epidemic of lobomycosis was reported in dolphins of the Indian River Lagoon in Florida.

== See also ==
- List of cutaneous conditions
