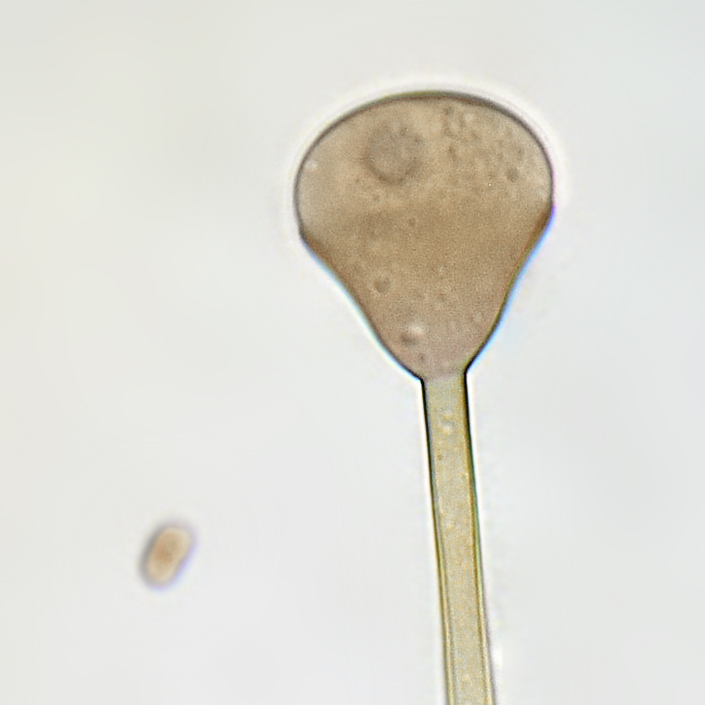

Scientific classification
- Kingdom: Fungi
- Division: Mucoromycota
- Class: Mucoromycetes
- Order: Mucorales
- Family: Saksenaeaceae
- Genus: Apophysomyces; P.C.Misra (1979)

Type species
- Apophysomyces elegans P.C.Misra, K.J.Srivast. & Lata (1979)

Species
- A. elegans A. ossiformis A. trapeziformis A. variabilis

= Apophysomyces =

Genus of fungi

Apophysomyces is a genus of filamentous fungi that are commonly found in soil and decaying vegetation. Species normally grow in tropical to subtropical regions.

The genus Apophysomyces historically was monospecific, containing only the type species Apophysomyces elegans. In 2010, three new species were described: variabilis, trapeziformis, and ossiformis.

== Characteristics ==
Among the other members of zygomycetes, Apophysomyces elegans mostly resembles those from genus Absidia. However, its bell-shaped (although not conical) apophyses (outgrowth), the existence of its foot-cell like hyphal segment, rhizoids produced opposite to the sporangiophores upon cultivation on plain agar, the darker and thicker subapical segment, and inability to sporulate on routine culture media help in distinguishing Apophysomyces elegans.

Apophysomyces elegans is a thermotolerant fungus: it has been found to grow favourably at temperatures of 26 °C and 37 °C, and it grows rapidly at 42 °C. Its colonies are fluffy and cottony in appearance. The surface of the colony is white initially and turns to a brownish-grey or yellowish-cream as the culture ages, while the underside is white to pale yellow in colour.

== Pathogenicity ==
Normally, no special precautions are needed with regard to this fungus.

However, Apophysomyces elegans and Apophysomyces trapeziformis are able to cause mucormycosis, in humans, which is often fatal but very rare. Reports of other mammals being infected are mostly restricted to captive species, but in 2021 a female lesser long-nosed bat was found with mucormycosis in the wild.

Infection is usually acquired via traumatic implantations associated with soil or decaying vegetable matter (such as from accidental injuries or insect bites). Invasive soft tissue infections can develop on burns or wounds which are contaminated by soil. Unlike other zygomycosis, the affected host is usually otherwise immunocompetent. Apophysomyces elegans infections present most commonly as necrotizing fasciitis and/or osteomyelitis. Systemic and secondary renal and bladder infections have also been reported.

== See also ==
- Mucormycosis (specific term for infection caused by fungi of the order Mucorales)
- Zygomycosis (a more generic term for infection caused by Mucoraceae and various other fungus varieties; the term Mucormycosis is preferred).
