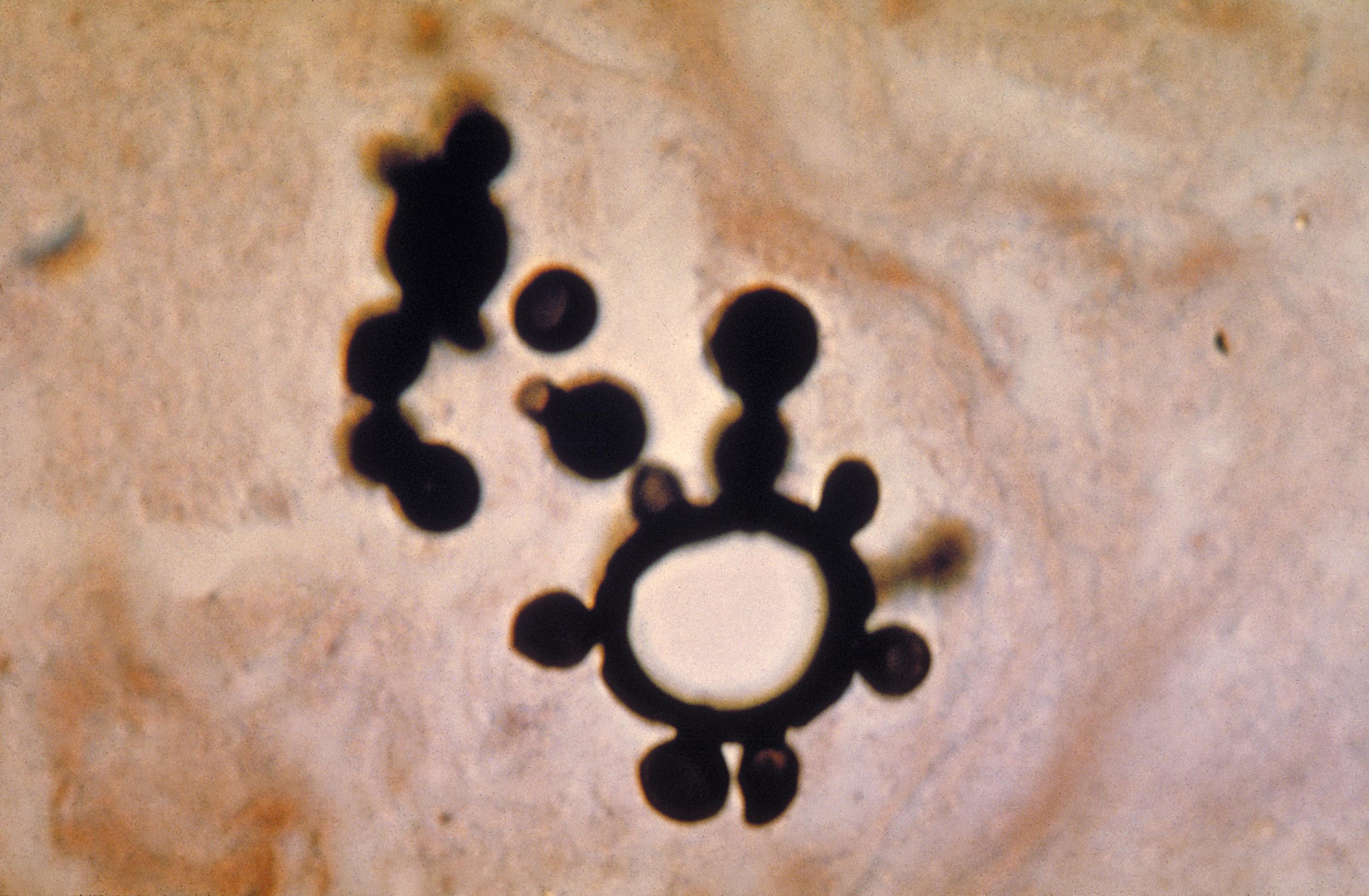
- Budding cells of Paracoccidioides brasiliensis

Scientific classification
- Kingdom: Fungi
- Division: Ascomycota
- Class: Eurotiomycetes
- Order: Onygenales
- Family: Ajellomycetaceae
- Genus: Paracoccidioides; F.P. Almeida (1930)

Type species
- Paracoccidioides brasiliensis (Splend.) F.P. Almeida (1930)

Species
- Paracoccidioides americana Paracoccidioides brasiliensis Paracoccidioides ceti Paracoccidioides lobogeorgii Paracoccidioides lutzii Paracoccidioides restrepoana (nom. inval.); Paracoccidioides venezuelensis (nom. inval.)

= Paracoccidioides =

Genus of fungi

Paracoccidioides is a genus of fungi in the order Onygenales. Species are known human pathogens producing yeast-like states under pathogenic conditions. They include the causative agents of paracoccidioidomycosis and lobomycosis.
