= Lacazia =

Lacazia loboi

Scientific classification
- Kingdom: Fungi
- Division: Ascomycota
- Class: Eurotiomycetes
- Order: Onygenales
- Genus: Lacazia

Synonyms
- Loboa loboi

Genus of fungi

Lacazia is a genus of fungi containing the single species Lacazia loboi, which is responsible for Lobo's disease. It is a member of the order Onygenales.

== Description and natural habitats ==
Lacazia loboi is a yeast-like fungus that causes infection in humans and bottle-nosed dolphins (Tursiops truncatus). Aqueous environments appear to be mandatory for the lifecycle of L. loboi. It is saprophytic in water and is transmitted to the vulnerable host via contact. Infections due to L. loboi are mostly reported from tropical zones.

== Species ==
The genus Lacazia contains a single species, Lacazia loboi. While the name Loboa loboi is still frequently used to refer to the causative agent of lobomycosis, more recently, classification of the fungus in the genus Lacazia and conclusively, the name Lacazia loboi has been proposed by McGinnis et al.

== Synonyms ==
See the summary of synonyms and teleomorph-anamorph relations for the Lacazia spp.

== Pathogenicity and clinical significance ==
L. loboi is the causative agent of a tropical mycosis, lobomycosis, which is characterized by mucocutaneous lesions, that are usually nodular, vegetating, verrucose, cauliflower-like and hyper- or hypopigmented. Lower extremities and the ears are most commonly involved. Nasal and labial lesions have rarely been reported.

Aquarium employees and farmers constitute most of the cases with lobomycosis. Occupations such as goldmining, fishing, and hunting also predispose to L. loboi infections. A previous cutaneous trauma, insect bite, or wound cut enhances the entry of the fungus through the skin via contact with infected surrounding, such as dolphins. No evidence shows person-to-person transmission of lobomycosis.

== Macroscopic features ==
Attempts to grow L. loboi on artificial media have as yet been unsuccessful.

== Microscopic features ==
Numerous yeast-like, round, thick-walled cells are visualized. Chains of yeast cells are typically formed. Little tube-like connections are visible between the yeast cells.

== Histopathologic features ==
Granuloma and yeast-like cells (diameter: 5-12 μm) forming chains are observed. As well as tube-like connections between the cells, secondary buds may also be visualized. The cells may be phagocytosed by histiocytes or multinucleated giant cells. Periodic-Acid-Schiff (PAS), Gomori's-Grocott's, and Gridley's silver stains are used for examination of histopathological sections.

== Comparisons ==
Cross-antigenicity has been detected between L. loboi and Paracoccidioides brasiliensis.

== Susceptibility ==
Since efforts to cultivate L. loboi have failed, no in vitro susceptibility data are available. Optional treatment of lobomycosis is surgical excision. Full excision of the lesion is required for clinical success. Repeated cryotherapy may also yield favorable clinical response. While there yet appears no optional medical therapy, clofazimine has been effective in some cases with lobomycosis.

== Sister taxon ==
It is a sister taxon to P. brasiliensis.
