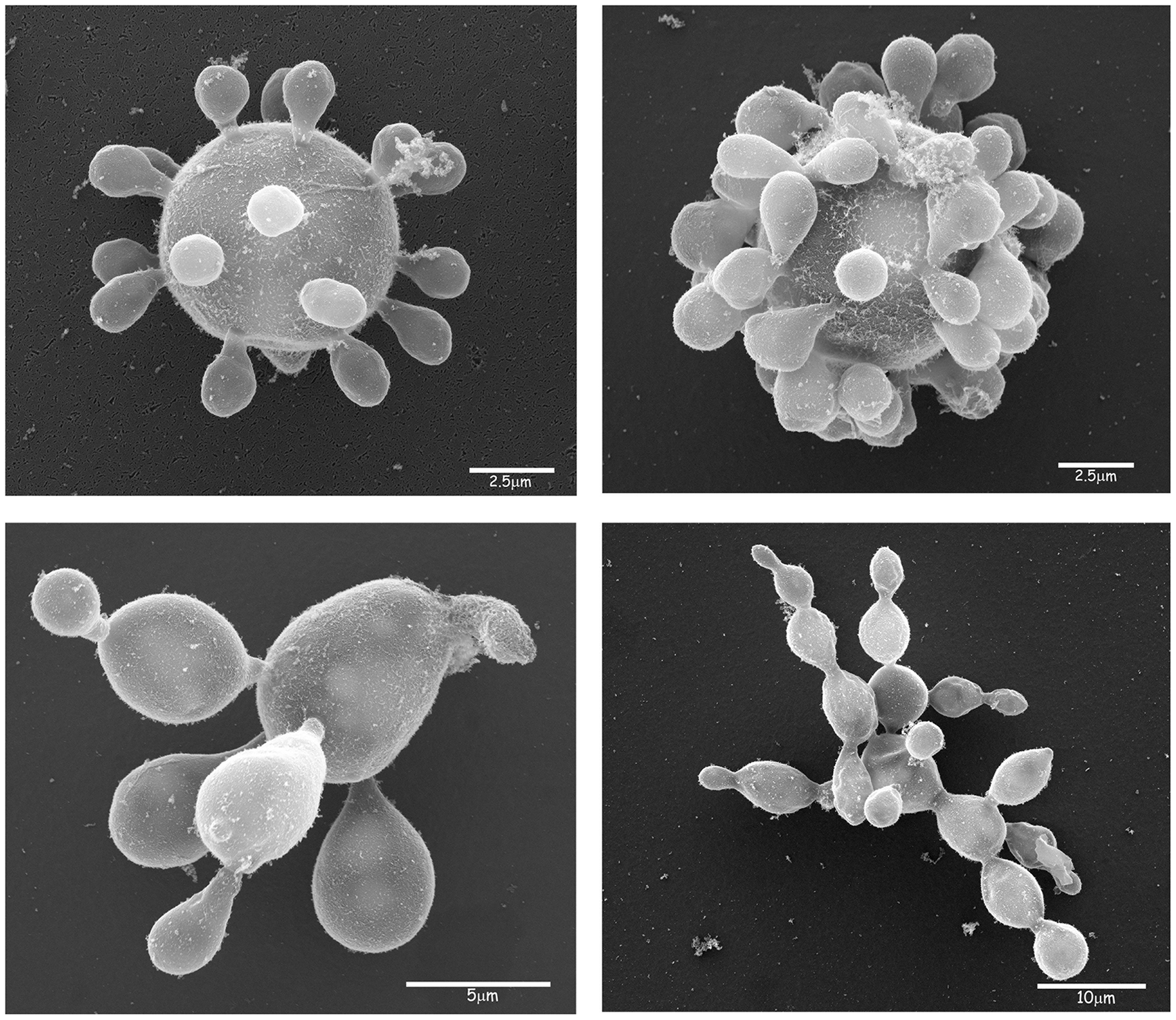

Scientific classification
- Kingdom: Fungi
- Division: Ascomycota
- Class: Eurotiomycetes
- Order: Onygenales
- Family: Ajellomycetaceae
- Genus: Paracoccidioides
- Species: P. lutzii

Binomial name
- Paracoccidioides lutzii Vilela, de Hoog, Bagagli & L. Mend.

= Paracoccidioides lutzii =

Species of fungus

Paracoccidioides lutzii is a dimorphic fungus that is one of the causal agents of paracoccidioidomycosis, together with Paracoccidioides brasiliensis. Unlike P. brasiliensis, which is found throughout Central and South America, P. lutzii is found only in Brazil and Ecuador. It is less virulent than P. brasiliensis.

== History ==
Paracoccidioides species were discovered by Adolfo Lutz in 1908 in Brazil. P. lutzii was formerly classified "PB-01 like", and proposed as a new species in 2014, being discovered in the Central-West region of Brazil. The infection it causes is considered to be a neglected endemic mycosis, a type of neglected tropical disease.

== Ecology ==
P. lutzii occurs in nature as a filamentous structure. It forms conidia as part of its life cycle, which cause infection when inhaled into the respiratory tract of humans.

== Epidemiology ==
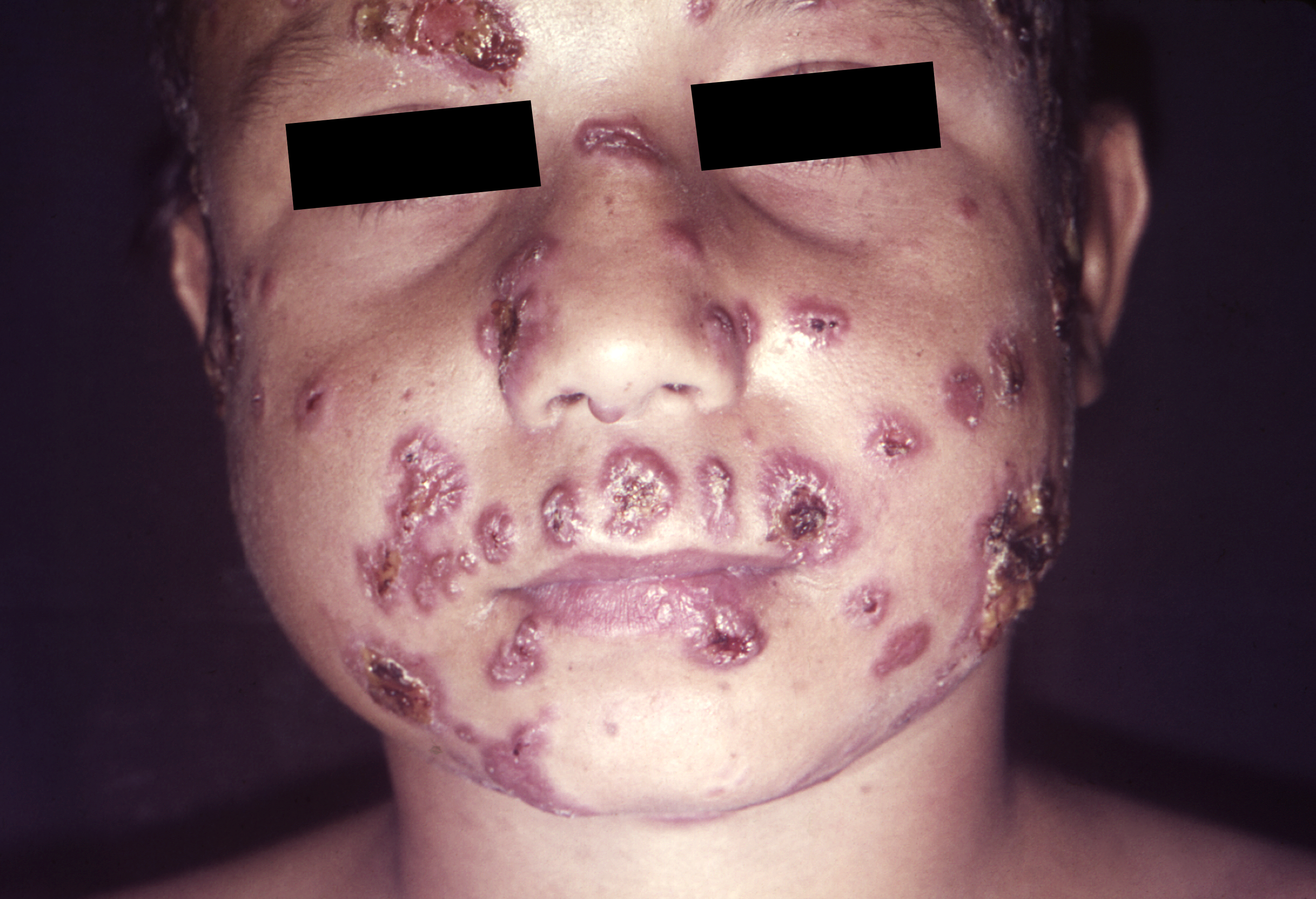
Lesions of paracoccidioidomycosis on a Brazilian child

Little is known about the epidemiology of the new species, as most previous epidemiological reports have focused on P. brasiliensis. Infection with the Paracoccidioides species, known as paracoccidioidomycosis, may be asymptomatic and subclinical, or may form into either acute/subacute (juvenile) or chronic (adult) forms of the disease. P. lutzii has less adhesion to lung cells than P. brasilensis, potentially explaining its decreased virulence.

It is predominantly distributed in the Central west and Amazon regions of Brazil and Ecuador.

Social and environmental changes, including increased agriculturalization, deforestation in Brazil, expansion of settlements and coffee agriculture could explain the increased incidence of Paracoccidioidies, especially in the Rondônia state of Brazil.
