= Posaconazole =

Pharmaceutical drug

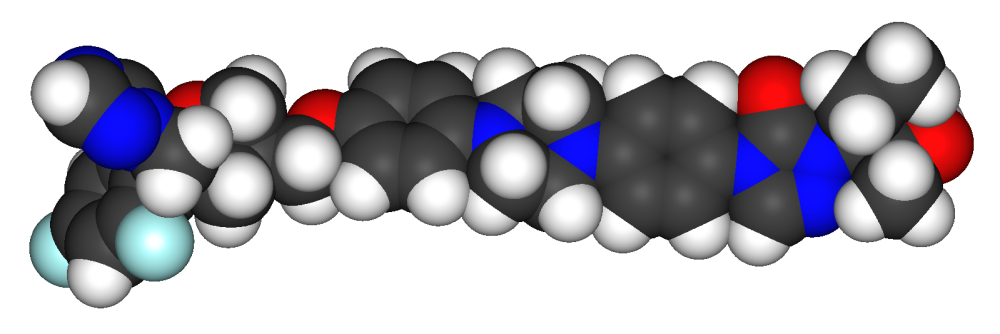

Clinical data
- Trade names: Noxafil, Posanol, others
- AHFS/Drugs.com: Monograph
- MedlinePlus: a607036
- License data: EU EMA: by INN; US DailyMed: Posaconazole; US FDA: Posaconazole
- Pregnancy category: AU: B3
- Routes of administration: By mouth, intravenous
- ATC code: J02AC04 (WHO)

Legal status
- Legal status: AU: S4 (Prescription only); CA: ℞-only; UK: POM (Prescription only); US: ℞-only; EU: Rx-only

Pharmacokinetic data
- Bioavailability: Low (8 to 47% Oral)
- Protein binding: 98 to 99%
- Metabolism: Liver (glucuronidation)
- Elimination half-life: 16 to 31 hours
- Excretion: Fecal (71–77%) and Kidney (13–14%)

Identifiers
- IUPAC name: 4-[4-[4-[4-[[(3R,5R)-5-(2,4-difluorophenyl)tetrahydro-5-(1H-1,2,4-triazol-1-ylmethyl)-3-furanyl]methoxy]phenyl]-1-piperazinyl]phenyl]-2-[(1S,2S)-1-ethyl-2- hydroxypropyl]-2,4-dihydro-3H-1,2,4-triazol-3-one
- CAS Number: 171228-49-2
- PubChem CID: 147912
- DrugBank: DB01263
- ChemSpider: 130409
- UNII: 6TK1G07BHZ
- KEGG: D02555
- ChEBI: CHEBI:64355
- ChEMBL: ChEMBL1397
- PDB ligand: X2N (PDBe, RCSB PDB)
- CompTox Dashboard (EPA): DTXSID6049066
- ECHA InfoCard: 100.208.201

Chemical and physical data
- Formula: C_{37}H_{42}F_{2}N_{8}O_{4}
- Molar mass: 700.792 g·mol^{−1}
- 3D model (JSmol): Interactive image
- SMILES: O=C1N(/N=C\N1c2ccc(cc2)N7CCN(c6ccc(OCC3C[C@@](OC3)(c4ccc(F)cc4F)Cn5ncnc5)cc6)CC7)[C@@H](CC)[C@@H](O)C
- InChI: InChI=1S/C37H42F2N8O4/c1-3-35(26(2)48)47-36(49)46(25-42-47)31-7-5-29(6-8-31)43-14-16-44(17-15-43)30-9-11-32(12-10-30)50-20-27-19-37(51-21-27,22-45-24-40-23-41-45)33-13-4-28(38)18-34(33)39/h4-13,18,23-27,35,48H,3,14-17,19-22H2,1-2H3/t26-,27?,35-,37-/m0/s1; Key:RAGOYPUPXAKGKH-AGDNISCASA-N

Posaconazole, sold under the brand name Noxafil among others, is a triazole antifungal medication.

It was approved for medical use in the European Union in October 2005, and in the United States in September 2006. It is available as a generic medication.

== Medical uses ==
Posaconazole is used to treat invasive Aspergillus and Candida infections. It is also used for the treatment of oropharyngeal candidiasis (OPC), including OPC refractory to other drugs such as itraconazole and fluconazole.

Clinical evidence of efficacy in treatment of invasive disease caused by Fusarium species (fusariosis) is limited.

Intravenous administration appears to be helpful in a mouse model of naegleriasis and the drug kills Acanthamoeba castellanii cysts in vitro.

It has been used to treat mucormycosis (black fungus disease) caused by Rhizopus mold.

== Pharmacology ==
=== Mechanism of action ===
Posaconazole works by disrupting the functions of certain fungal and protozoal membrane-bound enzyme systems. It does this by blocking the synthesis and turnover of the eukaryotic cell membrane component ergosterol via the inhibition of an enzyme known as CYP51. Posaconazole is significantly more potent at binding to CYP51 than itraconazole.

=== Pharmacokinetics ===
Posaconazole is absorbed within three to five hours. It is predominantly eliminated through the liver, and has a half-life of about 35 hours. Oral administration of posaconazole taken with a high-fat meal exceeds 90% bioavailability and increases the concentration by four times compared to fasting state.
