= Saksenaea =

Scientific classification
- Kingdom: Fungi
- Division: Mucoromycota
- Class: Mucoromycetes
- Order: Mucorales
- Family: Saksenaeaceae
- Genus: Saksenaea; S.B.Saksena (1953)

Type species
- Saksenaea vasiformis S.B.Saksena (1953)

Species
- S. erythrospora S. vasiformis

Genus of fungi

Saksenaea is a genus of fungi in the Saksenaeaceae family. First described in 1953, the genus contains two pathogenic species capable of causing severe human infections. Originally, Saksenaea vasiformis was the only species in the genus. Later, two new species were proposed: S. erythrospora y S. oblongispora.
