= Fusariosis =

- Specialty: Dermatology, infectious diseases
- Risk factors: Neutropenia, blood cancer
- Prognosis: Poor

Fusariosis is an infection seen in people with low neutrophils, a type of white blood cell that fights infection. It is a significant opportunistic pathogen in people with blood cancer.

It is associated with infections with Fusarium species, such as Fusarium proliferatum. It is fatal in more than half of cases.
