= Saksenaeaceae =

Scientific classification
- Kingdom: Fungi
- Division: Mucoromycota
- Class: Mucoromycetes
- Order: Mucorales
- Family: Saksenaeaceae; Hesselt. & J.J.Ellis (1974)

Type genus
- Saksenaea S.B.Saksena (1953)

Genera
- Apophysomyces; Saksenaea

Family of fungi

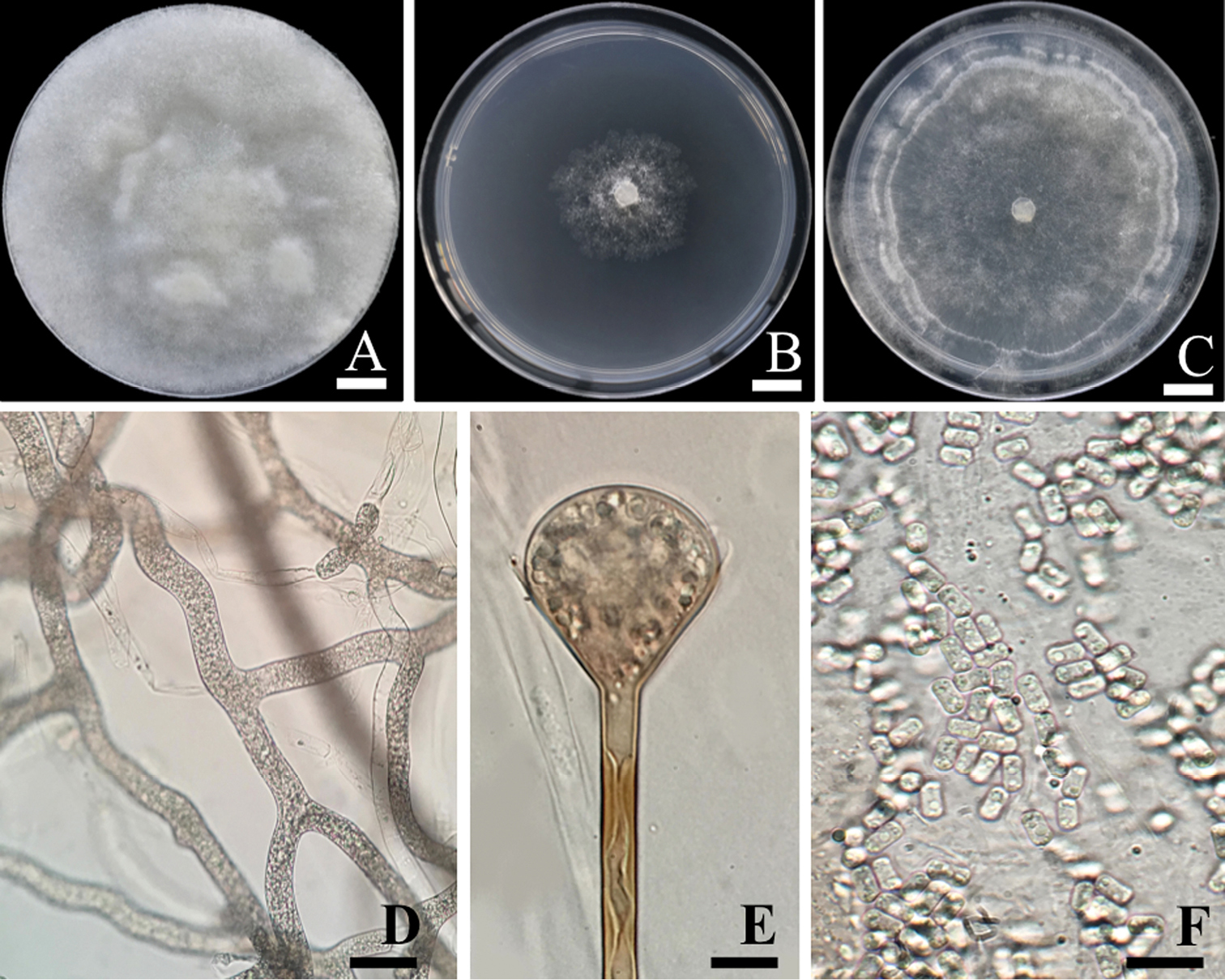
Colonies and microscope images of the fungus Apophysomyces thailandensis. The genus Apophysomyces belongs to the family Saksenaeaceae.

The Saksenaeaceae are a family of fungi in the order Mucorales. It was circumscribed in 1974 by J.J. Ellis and Clifford Hesseltine.

== Description ==
This family is characterized by having sporangia that are lageniform and columellate. Zygospores are unknown.
