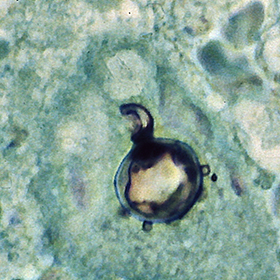

Scientific classification
- Kingdom: Fungi
- Division: Ascomycota
- Class: Eurotiomycetes
- Order: Onygenales
- Family: Ajellomycetaceae
- Genus: Paracoccidioides
- Species: P. brasiliensis

Binomial name
- Paracoccidioides brasiliensis (Splend.) F.P.Almeida (1930)

Synonyms
- Zymonema brasiliensis Splend. (1912); Coccidioides brasiliensis F.P.Almeida (1929)

= Paracoccidioides brasiliensis =

Species of fungus

Paracoccidioides brasiliensis is a dimorphic fungus and one of the two species that cause paracoccidioidomycosis (the other being Paracoccidioides lutzii). The fungus has been affiliated with the family Ajellomycetaceae (division Ascomycota) although a sexual state or teleomorph has not yet been found.

== History ==
Paracoccidioides brasiliensis was first discovered by Adolfo Lutz in 1908 in Brazil. Although Lutz did not suggest a name for the disease caused by this fungus, he made note of structures he called "pseudococcidica" together with mycelium in cultures grown at 25 °C. In 1912, Alfonse Splendore proposed the name Zymonema brasiliense and described the features of the fungus in culture. Finally in 1930, Floriano de Almeida created the genus Paracoccidioides to accommodate the species, noting its distinction from Coccidioides immitis.

== Physiology ==
Paracoccidioides brasiliensis is a nonphotosynthetic eukaryote with a rigid cell wall and organelles very similar to those of higher eukaryotes. Being a dimorphic fungus, it has the ability to grow an oval yeast-like form at 37 °C and an elongated mycelial form produced at room temperature. The mycelial and yeast phases differ in their morphology, biochemistry, and ultrastructure. The yeast form contains large amounts of α-(1,3)-linked glucan. The chitin content of the mycelial form is greater than that of the yeast form, but the lipid content of both phases is comparable.

The yeast reproduces by asexual budding, where daughter cells are borne asynchronously at multiple, random positions across the cell surface. Buds begin by layers of cell wall increasing in optical density at a point that eventually gives rise to the daughter cell. Once the bud has expanded, a cleavage plane develops between the nascent cell and the mother cell. Following dehiscence, the bud scar disappears. In tissue, budding occurs inside the granulomatous center of the disease lesion, as visualized by hematoxylin and eosin (H&E) staining of histologic sections. Nonbudding cells measure 5–15 μm in diameter, whereas those with multiple spherical buds measure from 10–20 μm in diameter. In electron microscopy, cells with multiple buds have been found to have peripherally located nuclei and cytoplasm surrounding a large central vacuole. In the tissue form of P. brasiliensis, yeast cells are larger with thinner walls and a narrower bud base than those of the related dimorphic fungus, Blastomyces dermatitidis. The yeast-like form of P. brasiliensis contains multiple nuclei, a porous two-layered nuclear membrane, and a thick cell wall rich in fibers, whereas the mycelial phase has thinner cell walls with a thin, electron-dense outer layer.

== Dimorphism ==
The mycelial form of P. brasiliensis can be converted to the yeast form in vitro by growth on brain heart infusion agar or blood-glucose-cysteine agar when incubated for 10–20 days at 37 °C. Under these conditions, hyphal cells either die or convert to transitional forms measuring 6–30 μm in diameter, which ultimately detach or remain on the hyphal cells, yielding buds. New buds develop mesosomes and become multinucleated. In contrast, yeast-like cultures can be converted to the mycelial form by reducing the incubation temperature from 37 to 25 °C. Initially, nutritional requirements of both the yeast and mycelial phases of P. brasiliensis were thought to be identical; however, later studies demonstrated the yeast form to be auxotrophic, requiring exogenous sulfur-containing amino acids including cysteine and methionine for growth.

== Ecology ==
Although the habitat of P. brasiliensis remains unknown, it is commonly associated with soils in which coffee is cultivated. It has also been associated with the nine-banded armadillo, Dasypus novemcinctus. The disease caused by P. brasiliensis is mostly geographically restricted to Latin American countries such as Brazil, Colombia, and Venezuela, with the greatest number of cases seen in Brazil. The endemic areas are characterized by hot, humid summers, dry temperate winters, average annual temperatures between 17 and 23 °C, and annual rainfall between 500 and 800 mm. However, the precise ecology regularities of the fungus remain elusive, and P. brasiliensis has rarely been encountered in nature outside the human host. One such rare example of environmental isolation was reported in 1971 by Maria B.de Albornoz and colleagues who isolated P. brasiliensis from samples of rural soil collected in Paracotos in the state of Miranda, Venezuela. In in vitro studies, the fungus has been shown to grow when inoculated into soil and sterile horse or cow excrement. The mycelial phase has also been shown to survive longer than the yeast phase in acidic soil. Despite a sexual state not having been documented, molecular investigations suggest the existence of recombining populations of P. brasiliensis, potentially by means of an undiscovered sexual state.

The existence of a sexual cycle in P. brasiliensis, is supported by both molecular and morphological data. A comparative genome analysis with other well-studied fungi demonstrated the presence of sex-related genes in both the yeast and mycelial phases of P. brasiliensis. Also crosses of isolates of different mating types led to the formation of young ascocarps (sexual structures) with constricted coiled hyphae related to the initial stage of mating.

== Epidemiology ==
Paracoccidioides brasiliensis causes a disease known as paracoccidioidomycosis characterized by slow, progressive granulomatous changes in the head mucosa, notably the nose and sinuses or the skin. Uncommonly, the disease affects the lymphatic system, the central nervous system, the gastrointestinal tract, or the skeletal system. Due to the high proportion of cases affecting the oral mucosa, these tissues were originally thought to be the primary route of entry of fungus. However, strong evidence now indicates the respiratory tract is the chief point of entry and P. brasiliensis lung lesions occur in nearly a third of progressive cases. The disease is not contagious. Paracoccidioidomycosis is more frequently seen in adult males than females. The hormone estrogen is thought to inhibit the transformation of the mycelial to the yeast form, as supported by in vitro experimental data, and this factor may account for the relative resistance of women to infection.

== Detection and surveillance ==
A number of serologic tests have been employed for the diagnosis of paracoccidioidomycosis. Double diffusion in agar gel and complement fixation test, are amongst the most commonly used tests in serodiagnosis. Culture extracts of the yeast or mycelia are exploited to produce effective, quick, and reproducible antigens. A study reported detection of 43 kD antigen in pooled sera of affected individuals, which might provide a basis for the development of a diagnostic test. Tests targeting the presence of serum antibodies to P. brasiliensis simultaneously detect both active and historical infections and cannot discriminate active infection. The evaluation of populations in endemic zones has shown roughly equal rates of seroconversion between men and women, suggesting equal rates of exposure, despite the strong male predominance shown by the clinical disease.

== Clinical manifestations ==
Paracoccidioides brasiliensis causes mucous membrane ulceration of the mouth and nose with spread through the lymphatic system. A hypothesized portal of entry for the fungus to the body is through the periodontal membrane. The route of infection is assumed to be inhalation following which the infective propagule gives rise to the distinctive multipolar budding yeast forms in the lung resembling a "ship's wheel" seen in histological sections. Both immunologically normal and compromised people are at risk for infection. The lungs, lymph nodes, and mucous membrane of the mouth are the most frequently infected tissues. The pathological features of paracoccidioidomycosis are similar to those seen in coccidioidomycosis and blastomycosis. However, in the former, the lesions first appear in the lymphoid tissue and then extend to mucous membranes, producing localized to diffusive tissue necrosis of the lymph nodes. The typically extensive involvement of lymphoid tissue and the limited occurrence of the gastrointestinal tract, bone and prostate set the clinical picture of paracoccidioidomycosis apart from that of blastomycosis.
