= Zygomycosis =

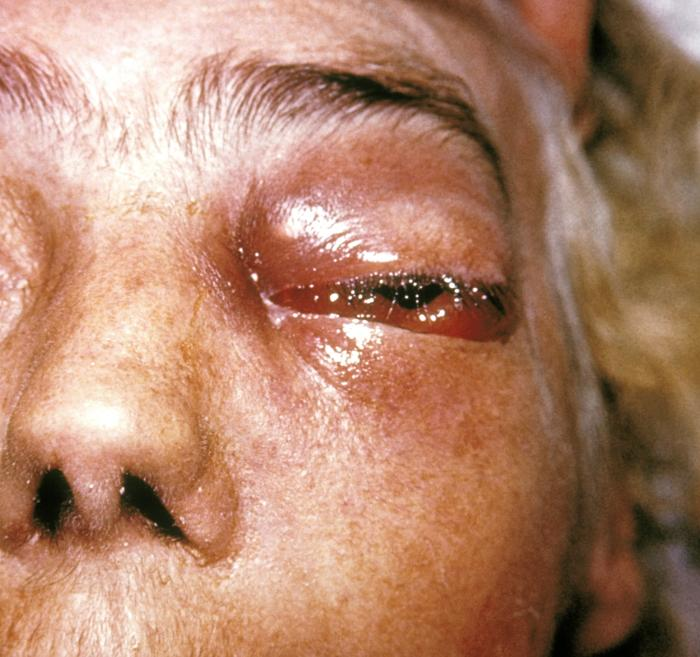
- Group of periorbital fungal infections including mucormycosis (shown) and phycomycosis
- Specialty: Infectious diseases

Zygomycosis is the broadest term to refer to infections caused by bread mold fungi of the zygomycota phylum. However, because zygomycota has been identified as polyphyletic, and is not included in modern fungal classification systems, the diseases that zygomycosis can refer to are better called by their specific names: mucormycosis (after Mucorales), phycomycosis (after Phycomycetes) and basidiobolomycosis (after Basidiobolus). These rare yet serious and potentially life-threatening fungal infections usually affect the face or oropharyngeal (nose and mouth) cavity. Zygomycosis type infections are most often caused by common fungi found in soil and decaying vegetation. While most individuals are exposed to the fungi on a regular basis, those with immune disorders (immunocompromised) are more prone to fungal infection. These types of infections are also common after natural disasters, such as tornadoes or earthquakes, where people have open wounds that have become filled with soil or vegetative matter.

The condition may affect the gastrointestinal tract or the skin, often beginning in the nose and paranasal sinuses. It is one of the most rapidly spreading fungal infections in humans. Treatment consists of prompt and intensive antifungal drug therapy and surgery to remove the infected tissue.

== Symptoms and signs ==
In the primary cutaneous form, the lesions are usually painful and necrotic, with black eschar, accompanied by a fever. Patients will usually present with a history of poorly controlled diabetes or malignancy. Myocutaneous infections may lead to amputation. Pulmonary tract infections seen with lung transplant patients, who are at high risk for fatal invasive mycoses. Rhinocerebral infection is characterized by paranasal swelling with necrotic tissues. Patient may have hemorrhagic exudates (tissue fluid from lesions tinged with blood) from the nose and eyes as the fungi penetrate through blood vessels and other anatomical structures.

== Causes ==
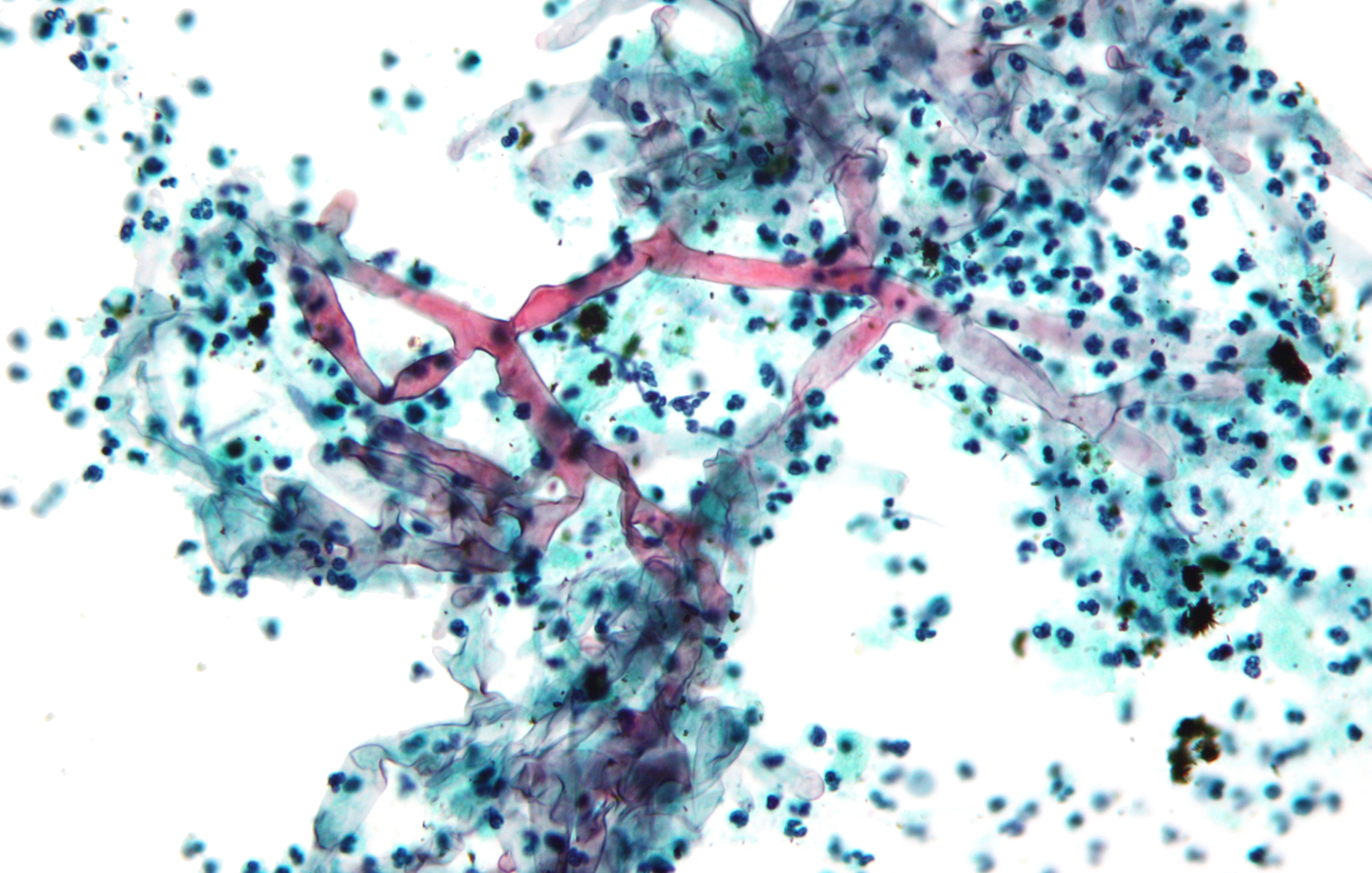
Micrograph showing a zygomycetes infection

Pathogenic zygomycosis is caused by species in two orders: Mucorales or Entomophthorales, with the former causing far more disease than the latter. These diseases are known as "mucormycosis" and "entomophthoramycosis", respectively.

- Order Mucorales (mucormycosis)
  - Family Mucoraceae
    - Absidia (Absidia corymbifera)
    - Apophysomyces (Apophysomyces elegans and Apophysomyces trapeziformis)
    - Mucor (Mucor indicus)
    - Rhizomucor (Rhizomucor pusillus)
    - Rhizopus (Rhizopus oryzae)
  - Family Cunninghamellaceae
    - Cunninghamella (Cunninghamella bertholletiae)
  - Family Thamnidiaceae
    - Cokeromyces (Cokeromyces recurvatus)
  - Family Saksenaeaceae
    - Saksenaea (Saksenaea vasiformis)
  - Family Syncephalastraceae
    - Syncephalastrum (Syncephalastrum racemosum)
- Order Entomophthorales (entomophthoramycosis)
  - Family Basidiobolaceae
    - Basidiobolus (Basidiobolus ranarum)
  - Family Ancylistaceae
    - Conidiobolus (Conidiobolus coronatus/Conidiobolus incongruus)

== Diagnosis ==
Diagnosis is done with potassium hydroxide (KOH) preparation in tissue. On light microscopy, there will be broad, ribbon-like septate hyphae with 90 degree angles on branches. KOH wet mount of the black eschar will show fungal aseptate hyphae with right angle branching. Periodic Acid Schiff (PAS) staining will reveal similar broad hyphae in the dermis and cutis. Fungal culture can also confirm the organism. Diagnosis remains difficult due to the lack of laboratory tests as mortality remains high. In 2005, a multiplex PCR test was able to identify five species of Rhizopus and may prove useful as a screening method for visceral mucormycosis in the future.

The clinical approach to diagnosis includes radiologic, where more than ten nodules and pleural effusion are associated to pulmonary forms of the disease. In CT, a reverse halo sign is noted. Direct microscopy and histopathology, and cultures remain the gold standards for diagnoses. Zygomycophyta share close clinical and radiological features to Aspergillosis. Invasive procedures such as bronchial endoscopy and lung biopsy may be necessary to confirm pulmonary diagnosis are no validated indirect tests are available. Quantitative polymerase chain reaction to detect serum DNA of the pathogen shows promise.

== Treatment ==
The condition may affect the gastrointestinal tract or the skin. In non-trauma cases, it usually begins in the nose and paranasal sinuses and is one of the most rapidly spreading fungal infections in humans. Common symptoms include thrombosis and tissue necrosis.

Due to the organisms' rapid growth and invasion, zygomycosis presents with a high fatality rate. Treatment must begin immediately with debridement of the necrotic tissue plus amphotericin B. Complete excision of the infectious tissue may be required as suspected dead tissue must be excised aggressively. In a documented case, conservative surgical drainage and intravenous amphotericin B in an insulin-dependent diabetic was proven effective in sino-orbital infection. The prognosis varies vastly depending upon an individual patient's circumstances.

== Epidemiology ==
Zygomycosis has been found in survivors of the 2004 Indian Ocean earthquake and tsunami and in survivors of the 2011 Joplin, Missouri tornado.

== Other animals ==
The term oomycosis is used to describe oomycete infections. These are more common in animals, notably dogs and horses. These are heterokonts, not true fungi. Types include pythiosis (caused by Pythium insidiosum) and lagenidiosis.

Zygomycosis has been described in a cat, where fungal infection of the tracheobronchus led to respiratory disease requiring euthanasia.
