= Basidiobolus haptosporus =

Scientific classification
- Kingdom: Fungi
- Division: Basidiobolomycota
- Class: Basidiobolomycetes
- Order: Basidiobolales
- Family: Basidiobolaceae
- Genus: Basidiobolus
- Species: B. haptosporus

Binomial name
- Basidiobolus haptosporus Drechsler (1947)

Species of zygomycotic fungus

Basidiobolus haptosporus belongs to the Kingdom Fungi and is a member of a grouping known as the "zygomycetes". This classification comprises two Phyla- the Mucoromycota and the Zoopagomycota, which are characterized by the production of sexual zygospores and suspensor cells. B. haptosporus is a filamentous fungus with distribution concentrated in Tropical and Subtropical regions. This fungus is largely associated with the gastrointestinal tract of amphibians and reptiles but has also been reported on mite bristles. B. haptosporus has caused disease in humans as well, including Gastrointestinal entomophthoromycosis and subcutaneous phycomycosis. Closely related species include Basidiobolus ranarum, B. meristosporus, B. microsporus, and B. magnus.

== Taxonomy & phylogeny ==
The Genus Basidiobolus was first described from frog excrement by Eidam in 1886 with the species Basidiobolus ranarum. The species, Basidiobolus haptosporus, was first described by Charles Drechsler in 1947. The Basidiobolus genus is found in the Zoopagomycota Phylum under the Subphylum Entomophthoromycotina. Morphological and physiological features of Basidiobolus species vary based on environmental conditions, and as such there has been much controversy surrounding the naming and methods of interspecies differentiation within the genus. The naming conventions of the species within Basidiobolus have changed numerous times, from regarding the species Basidiobolus meristosporus and Basidiobolus haptosporus as synonyms, where Basidiobolus ranarum describes all pathogenic species of Basidiobolus, to regarding most species of Basidiobolus including B. haptosporus and B. meristosporus as synonyms for B. ranarum. Another classification of species within Basidiobolus includes results from a 1986 study that used an immunodiffusion technique to evaluate the antigenic relationship between species in Basidiobolus and Conidiobolus, which found that B. haptosporus and B. ranarum are distinct from other Basidiobolus and Conidiobolus species including B. meristosporus and are similar to one another. More recent studies have found that B. ranarum is not the only pathogen-causing species of Basidiobolus, but that B. haptosporus and B. meristosporus have been found to cause disease in humans as well, including subcutaneous and intestinal disease. A 2021 study that has further investigated the morphological and physiological characteristics of species within Basidiobolus has suggested that many of the characteristics that were once considered "defining" for species differentiation in Basidiobolus are proving to be unreliable and highly variable, suggesting that previous species delineations could require further investigation.

== Morphology ==
Basidiobolus haptosporus can generally be identified by large, vegetative hyphae and many spherical, smooth-walled zygospores. Immature and mature zygospores can be differentiated by whether they have the ability to take up the stain Lactophenol Cotton Blue. Immature zygospores easily take up the stain, revealing smooth walls and irregular shapes, whereas mature zygospores (after 10–14 days in culture) do not take up the stain and are characterized by thick, smooth walls and are spherical and 30-45 micrometers in diameter. Cultures of B. haptosporus grown on Sabouraud dextrose agar (SDA) plates have shown a growth habit of creating grey, smooth, flat, and glabrous colonies without the presence of obvious aerial hyphae or the musty Streptomyces-like odor typically associated with other Basidiobolus species. As the B. haptosporus cultures age on the SDA plates (5–6 days post-subculturing), the colony becomes a pale yellow color with radially folded hyphae, reaching a diameter of approximately 1–2 cm. Additionally, there were numerous elliptical adhesive conidia produced at the end of conidiophores and the formation of hyphal bodies and spherical conidia (25-35 micrometers diameter) with thin walls and prominent granular cytoplasm. This tendency of entomophtoraceous fungi to form these 'hyphal bodies' was first described in Callaghan in 1888, and was described as the fungus becoming organized into "separated discrete protoplasts". Conidia were found to be much more abundantly produced from germinating zygospores than from hyphal segments.

Characteristics that were previously regarded as "defining" characteristics are being brought into question, as variation due to age or environmental conditions may change these features in the fungus. Some of these characteristics include the production of smooth zygospores, which used to be crucial for species determination between Basidiobolus haptosporus and Basidiobolus ranarum. It has been found that this feature is not always reliable due to the loss of undulation in old zygospores and young zygospores always having smooth walls The results of this 2021 study suggest that this feature, along with odor formation and the production of whitish-mycelia are highly variable, and as such cannot be relied on for species classifications.

== Ecology ==
Basidiobolus species occur mainly within tropical and subtropical regions and have generally been associated with the gastrointestinal tract of amphibians, but are also found in reptiles, other animals and insects, soil, and plant detritus. Early reports of the genus refer to the fungus as a saprophyte in amphibians and reptiles, dating back to 1886. In addition to the frequent association with amphibians, Basidiobolus has also been found in association with gamasid mite species such as Leptogamasus obesus in Germany and it is theorized that fungal spores can persist on the bristles of these mites and other insects as a saprophyte, and have made their way into reptiles, amphibians, and potentially humans, by means of ingestion of infested mites.

== Relevance for humans ==
Basidiobolus haptosporus has been proven to cause disease in humans, including both gastrointestinal and subcutaneous mycosis, and has even resulted in death in some cases. The first case of human infection caused by B. haptosporus was reported in Indonesia in 1956. While infections in humans and animals are rare, when it does occur, mycosis caused by B. haptosporus is more commonly seen in children. Subcutaneous mycosis tends to present as a well-defined, firm, moveable mass on extremities in subcutaneous tissue. Gastrointestinal mycosis tends to present with typical stomach and colon disease symptoms, including abdominal pain, fever, heavy sweating, and diarrhea. A disease caused by B. haptosporus that is known as Entomophtoromycosis can infect previously healthy individuals and is a chronic, inflammatory, or granulomatous infection. Management of these diseases is typically treated with common antifungal therapies including potassium iodide (KI), amphotericin B, itraconazole, and ketoconazole, and surgery. It is hypothesized that the use of "toilet leaves" is a potential source of infections in humans, as the soil and vegetation could be contaminated by the fecal matter of amphibians and reptiles.

Case reports:

- A 40-year-old man in India with Entomophthoromycosis in 2009- presented with an ulcerative wound and serosanguineous discharge after surgery. B. haptosporus was recovered on culture from the surgical wound and subsequent chronic ulcer that grew.
- A 2-year-old child in South Africa with Subcutaneous Phycomycosis in 1980- presented with nodules on hands and forearms, which were not painful, but continued to enlarge.
- A 4-year-old child in Brazil with Gastrointestinal Entomophthoromycosis in 1979- presented with a month-long history of abdominal pain, fever, heavy sweats, and a mass in the stomach and colon. B. haptosporus was isolated from the tumoral mass.
- Samples from colon biopsies from patients with Gastrointestinal Basidiobolomycosis in Saudi Arabia- the DNA sequence from these samples shows a 99.7% similarity with B. haptosporus.
