= Basidiobolus omanensis =

Scientific classification
- Kingdom: Fungi
- Division: Basidiobolomycota
- Class: Basidiobolomycetes
- Order: Basidiobolales
- Family: Basidiobolaceae
- Genus: Basidiobolus
- Species: B. omanensis

Binomial name
- Basidiobolus omanensis Al-Hatmi et al. (2021)

Species of fungus

Basidiobolus omanensis is a filamentous fungus found in the Arabian Peninsula. It is pathogenic to humans and, together with Basidiobolus ranarum, is one of the recognized causative agents of basidiobolomycosis, a rare fungal infection affecting humans.
