= Lagenidium giganteum f. caninum =

Scientific classification
- Domain: Eukaryota
- (unranked): SAR
- (unranked): Heterokonta
- Class: Oomycota
- Order: Lagenidiales
- Family: Lagenidiaceae
- Genus: Lagenidium
- Species: L. giganteum
- Form: L. g. f. caninum

Trinomial name
- Lagenidium giganteum f. caninum

Species of single-celled organism

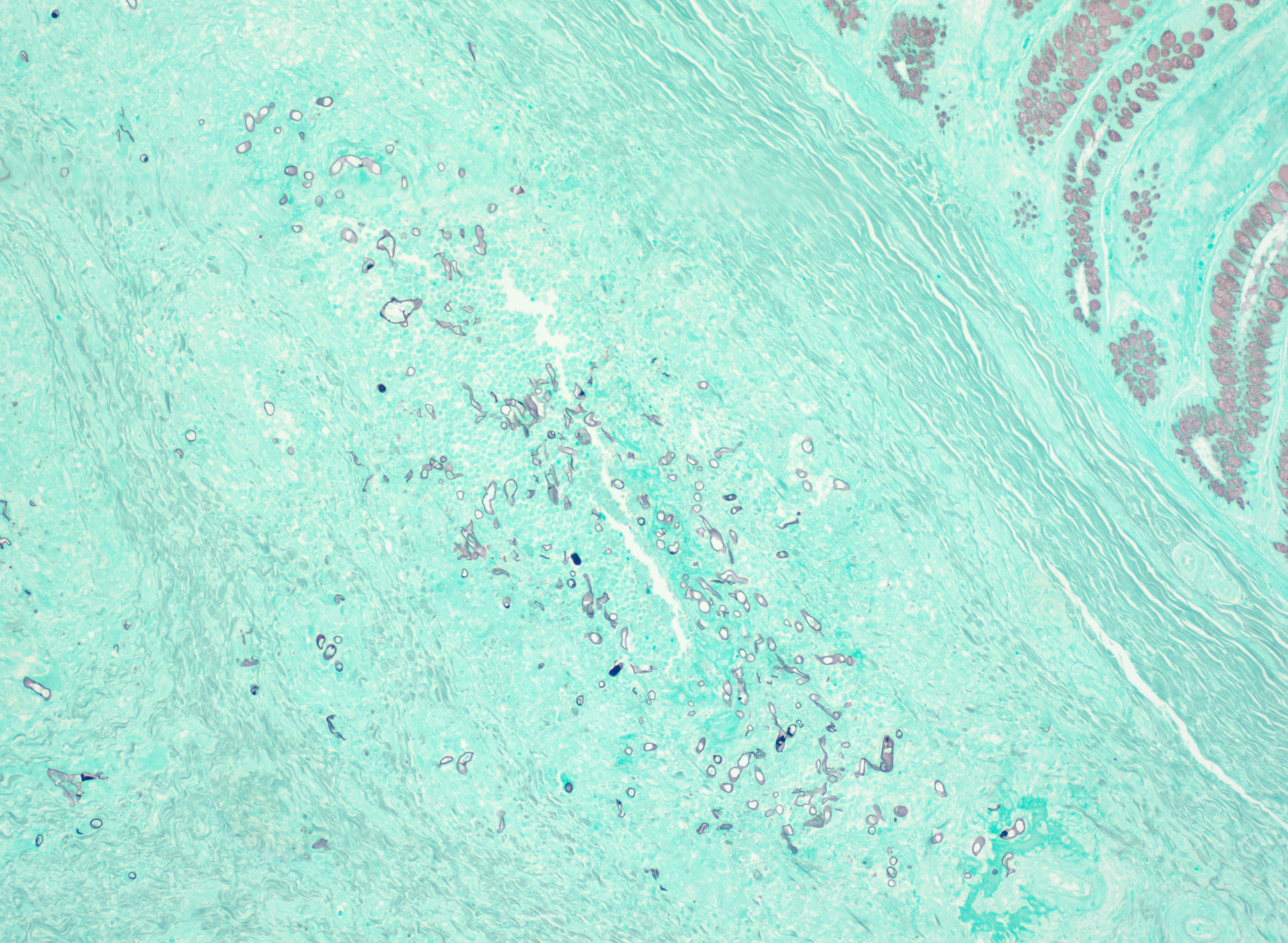
Histological section of the intestine of a dog with lagenidiosis. Organisms are highlighted in black in the submucosa of the intestine. 10x (Grocott's methenamine silver).

Lagenidium giganteum forma caninum is a fungus-like organism that belongs to the genus Lagenidium. In some mammal species, it causes lagenidiosis, a disease characterized by progressive, severe, and invasive cutaneous, subcutaneous, and disseminated infection. Clinical and pathological aspects of the disease are almost identical to pythiosis. The first cases of lagenidiosis in mammals were officially reported in dogs in 2003. Since then, it has become increasingly recognized in dogs and cats as a cause of skin lesions.

== Taxonomy ==
The genus Lagenidium was first registered in the Index Fungorum in 1857. It belongs to the family of Lagenidiaceae, order of Lagenidiales and class Oomycota. Lagenidium contains many saprotrophic species, at least two of which are responsible for disease in animals: L. giganteum forma caninum and L. decidium. According to the National Center for Biotechnology Information, there are seven species officially registered within the genus, including the f. caninum and 30 unclassified strains.

- Lagenidium albertoi
- Lagenidium caudatum
- Lagenidium deciduum
- Lagenidium aff. deciduum LEV5864
- Lagenidium giganteum
  - Lagenidium giganteum f. caninum
- Lagenidium juracyae

Lagenidium species can be found in a wide variety of hosts, including algae, phytoplankton, pollen, and crustaceans. The genus consists mainly of entomopathogenic organisms. L. giganteum was formerly used for biological control of mosquitoes, but is now deregistered by the United States Environmental Protection Agency. In 1999, a new species with phylogenetic similarity to L. giganteum was discovered in dogs with skin infection. It was recognized taxonomically and officially as forma caninum in 2013 and has been isolated from mammalian tissue lesions in the last two decades. The main phenotypic difference observed between these taxa is the divergent ability to grow at mammalian body temperature (≈ 36–39 °C), strongly suggesting that this feature is key to mammalian pathogenicity. Considering the strong relationship between Lagenidium giganteum forma caninum and L. giganteum f. giganteum, it is also suggested that further investigation of host specificity and potential mammalian pathogenicity of L. giganteum f. giganteum should be assessed. Other genera of oomycetes, such as Pythium and Phytophthora, are economically important plant pathogens and species within the genera Pyhtium, Saprolegnia, Achlya, and Aphanomyces are also animal pathogens. However, there are reports of a plant oomycete being pathogenic for animals, or vice versa, including species within Lagenidium genera.

== Life cycle ==
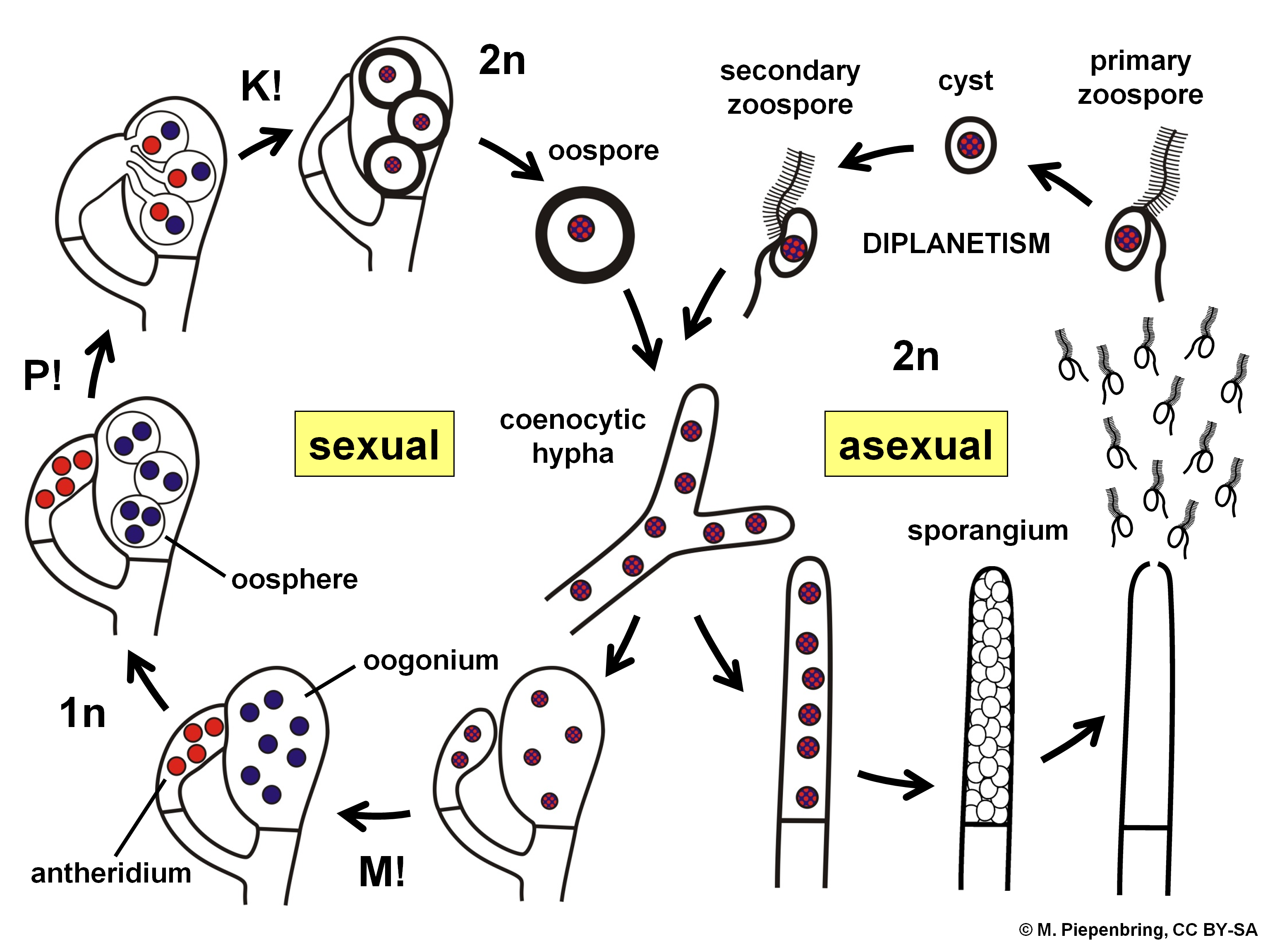
Life cycle of Saprolegnia sp., an important oomycete pathogen of aquatic amphibians and fishes

The life cycle and habitat of L. giganteum f. caninum is similar to its related species, L. giganteum, which can grow without a host. It can be found in bodies of fresh water and is observed to sustain mosquito populations. The life cycle of L. giganteum is initiated by a biflagellate zoospore that infects a mosquito larvae host by attachment, and undergoes encystment, penetration, and growth. The zoospore production can occur either by sexual or asexual reproduction that seems to require exogenous sources of sterols structurally related to cholesterol. For mycelial growth, the organism kills the host by starvation. Cells can reproduce asexually while forming an exit tube, where the content migrates to the tube's tip and quickly matures into zoospores, or alternately, two cells can fuse, forming oospores as seen in Saprolegnia sp. cycle. Lagenidum giganteum can undergo a latent stage surviving for long periods (months to years). The saprophytic or vegetative stage of the oomycetes from the genus Lagenidium is characterized by filamentous mycelial growth and requires little carbon and nitrogen sources. Hyphae can survive indefinitely as a saprophyte while using energy source from rotting vegetation, dead insects, or other organic material.

== Morphologic characteristics ==
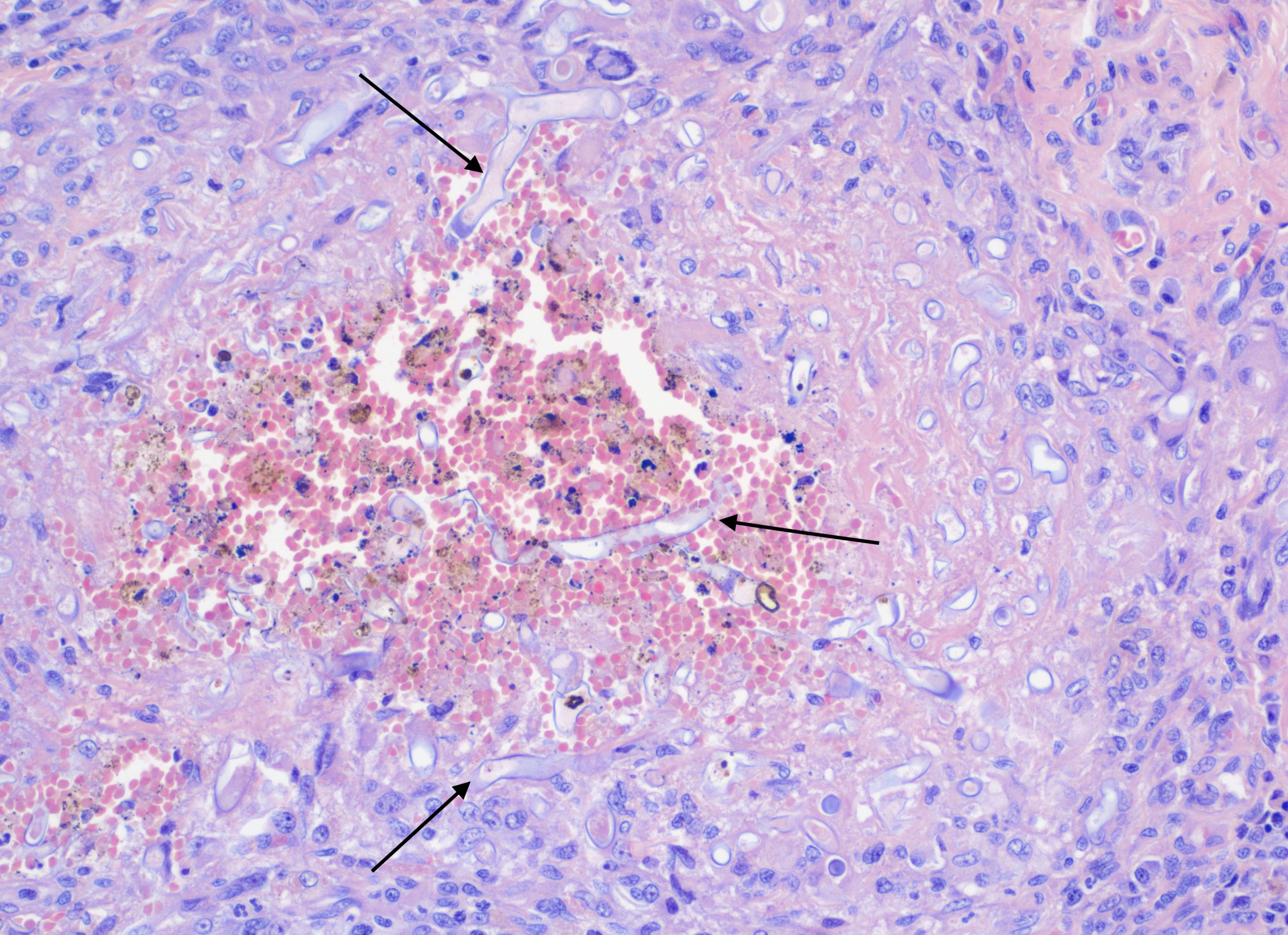
Histological section of the intestine of a dog with lagenidiosis. Organisms are seen in the lumen of a blood vessel associated with eosinophilic and granulomatous inflammation, necrosis and vasculitis (arrows). The hyphal structures are wide, measuring 2–7 μm, showing negative staining, ribbon-like, rarely septate and have an irregular, non-parallel wall 40x (Hematoxylin & Eosin).

Lagenidium spp. colonies from mammalian strains are characterized by a colorless or yellow aerial mycelia presenting an irregular radiating pattern. The mycelium has oval and spherical segments (30–40 μm) and hyphae are composed by irregular large segments of more than 400 μm, containing 1–2 discharge tubes with terminal vesicles enclosing zoospores (9–12 μm each). Encysted zoospores contain germ tubes. Broad hyphal structures of Lagenidium giganteum forma caninum can also be seen in histopathological specimens with a mean diameter of 4 μm (range, 2–7 μm) and are rarely septate with nonparallel walls and irregular branching.

== Pathogenicity and relevance for animals and humans ==
The mechanism of infection in animals for Lagenidium giganteum forma caninum and P. insidiosum is similar, and also seems to be similar to the host infection mechanism used by L. giganteum. After finding a suitable host, the zoospores can penetrate the skin, usually in areas with a previous injury. One important relevant risk factor associated with the occurrence of the disease in domestic animals includes swimming in contaminated lakes and ponds with the potential presence of the organism.

The main species affected with lagenidiosis are dogs and cats. The disease has been characterized by clinical and pathological aspects that resemble those caused by P. insidiosum. However, there are often more invasive cutaneous and subcutaneous lesions, with rapid progress and poor response to treatment and prognosis. Cutaneous injuries are seen as ulcerative, firm, and nodular, with a sinus tract and frequently encompassing lymphatic involvement, and in some cases, can be macroscopically similar to cutaneous infections caused by Basidiobolus raranarum. There are no official reports of Lagenidium species causing infection in humans but at least one case of human ocular lagenidiosis has been documented.

== Diagnosis ==
The diagnosis of various forms of oomycosis in mammals is very difficult by clinical and pathological evaluation alone. It is necessary to perform complementary diagnostic tests to properly describe the causative agent. The definitive diagnosis of Lagenidium giganteum forma caninum is mainly based on culture, serological tests, and molecular-based diagnosis such as conventional or panfungal PCR.

== Treatment ==
While L. giganteum is susceptible to extreme temperatures (less than 8 °C and greater than 34 °C) in the environment and when inside of the mosquito larvae host, to insecticidal substances like organophosphates and carbamates. The absence of ergosterol in the oomycete cell makes azole-type antifungal drugs useless. Reports of various drugs (e.g., tigecycline) targeting oomycota in vitro have been published recently, but there is still a lack of strong evidence for them. The clinical management for the disease is currently radical surgery of the affected area.
