= Phycomycosis =

- Causes: various species of fungi and oomycota

Phycomycosis is an uncommon condition affecting the gastrointestinal tract and skin, most commonly found in dogs and horses. The condition is caused by various molds (a type of fungi), including pythiosis, zygomycosis, and lagenidiosis. Pythiosis, the most common type, is caused by Pythium, a type of water mold. Zygomycosis can be caused by two types of zygomycetes: Entomophthorales (e.g., Basidiobolus and Conidiobolus) and Mucorales (e.g., Mucor, Mortierella, Absidia, Rhizopus, Rhizomucor, and Saksenaea). The latter type of zygomycosis is also referred to as mucormycosis. Lagenidiosis is caused by a Lagenidium species, which, like Pythium, is a kind of water mold. Since both pythiosis and lagenidiosis are caused by organisms from the Oomycetes and not the Fungi kingdom, they are sometimes collectively referred to as oomycosis.

== Pythiosis ==
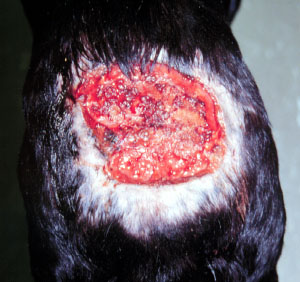
Ulcerative and destructive skin lesion on a dog caused by Pythium insidiosum

Pythiosis is caused by Pythium insidiosum and occurs most commonly in dogs and horses, but is also found in cats, cattle, and humans. In the United States, it is most commonly found in states bordering the Gulf of Mexico, especially Louisiana, but has been found in the Midwest and Eastern states as well. It is also found in Southeast Asia, eastern Australia, New Zealand, and South America. Pythiosis occurs in areas with mild winters due to the organism surviving in standing water that does not reach freezing temperatures. Pythium occupies swamps in late summer and infects dogs who drink water containing it. The disease is typically found in young, large-breed dogs.

It is suspected that pythiosis is caused by the invasion of the organism into wounds, either in the skin or in the gastrointestinal tract. The disease grows slowly in the stomach and small intestine, eventually forming large lumps of granulation tissue. It can also invade surrounding lymph nodes. Symptoms include vomiting, diarrhea, weight loss, a mass in the abdomen, and depression. Pythiosis of the skin in dogs is very rare and appears as ulcerated lumps. Primary infection can also occur in the bones and lungs.

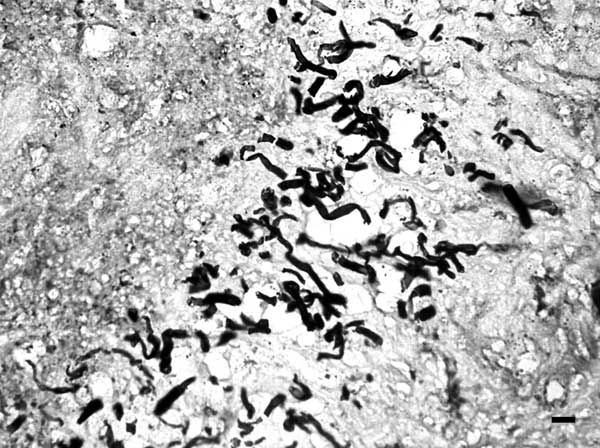
Pythium hyphae

In horses, subcutaneous pythiosis is the most common form. Infection occurs through a wound while standing in water containing the pathogen. The disease is also known as leeches, swamp cancer, and bursatti. Lesions are most commonly found on the lower limbs, abdomen, chest, and genitals. They are granulomatous and itchy, and may be ulcerated or fistulated. The lesions often contain yellow, firm masses of dead tissue known as kunkers. For cases with chronic infection, it is possible for the disease to spread to underlying bone.

In cats, pythioisis is almost always confined to the skin as hairless and edematous lesions. It is usually found on the limbs, perineum, and at the base of the tail. Lesions may also develop in the nasopharynx.

In humans, it can cause arteritis, keratitis, and periorbital cellulitis.

Pythium insidiosum is different from other members of the genus in that human and horse hair, skin, and decaying animal tissue are chemoattractants for its zoospores, in addition to decaying plant tissue.

== Zygomycosis ==
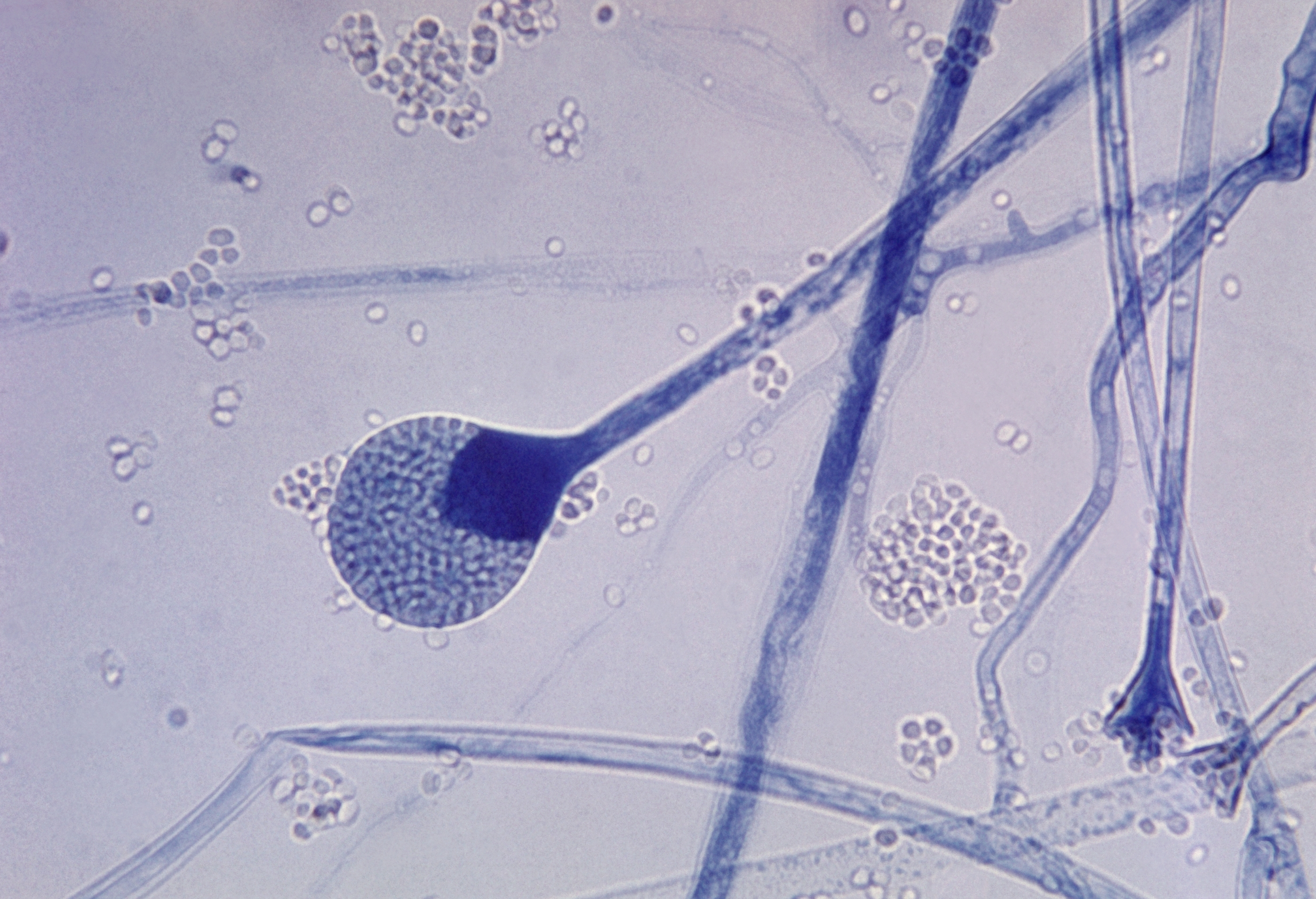
A mature sporangium of a Mucor sp. fungus

Zygomycosis is most often a disease of the skin, but can also occur in the sinuses or gastrointestinal tract. In humans, it is most prevalent in immunocompromised patients (people living with HIV/AIDS, the elderly, people with severe combined immunodeficiency, etc.) and patients with acidosis (i.e., diabetes, burns), particularly after barrier injury to the skin or mucous membranes. Zygomycosis caused by Mucorales causes a rapidly progressing disease of sudden onset in sick or immunocompromised animals. Entomophthorales caused chronic, local infections in otherwise healthy animals. The important species that cause entomophthoromycosis are Conidiobolus coronatus, C. incongruous, and Basidiobolus ranarum. Conidiobolus infections of the upper respiratory system have been reported in humans, sheep, horses, and dogs, and Basidiobolus has been reported less commonly in humans and dogs. Horses are one of the most common domestic animals to be affected by entomophthoromycosis. C. coronatus causes lesions in the nasal and oral mucosa of horses that may cause nasal discharge or difficulty breathing. B. ranarum causes large circular nodules on the upper body and neck of horses. Entomophthorales is found in soil and decaying plant matter, and, specifically, Basidiobolus can be contracted from insects and the feces of reptiles or amphibians.

Zygomycosis of the sinuses can extend from the sinuses into the orbit and the cranial vault, leading to rhinocerebral mucormycosis.

== Lagenidiosis ==
The best known species of Lagenidium is Lagenidium giganteum, a parasite of mosquito larvae used in the biological control of mosquitoes. Two different species exclusively cause disease in dogs: L. caninum and L. karlingii. Lagenidium is found in the Southeastern United States in lakes and ponds. Lagenidiosis causes progressive skin and subcutaneous lesions in the legs, groin, trunk, and near the tail. The lesions are firm nodules or ulcerated regions with draining tracts. Regional lymph nodes are usually swollen. Spread of the disease to distant lymph nodes, large blood vessels, and the lungs may occur. An aneurysm of a great vessel can rupture and cause death. L. caninum is the more aggressive species and is more likely to spread to other organs than L. karlingii.

== Diagnosis and treatment ==
Diagnosis is through biopsy, culture or an enzyme-linked immunosorbent assay (ELISA) test. Treatment is very difficult and includes surgery when possible. Postoperative recurrence is common. Antifungal drugs show only limited effect on the disease, but itraconazole and terbinafine hydrochloride are often used for 2 to 3 months following surgery. Humans with Basidiobolus infections have been treated with amphotericin B and potassium iodide. For pythiosis and lagenidiosis, a drug targeting water molds called caspofungin is available, although its high cost makes its usage to be rare. Immunotherapy has been used successfully in humans and horses with pythiosis. The prognosis for any type of phycomycosis is poor.
