= Basidiobolus philippinensis =

Scientific classification
- Kingdom: Fungi
- Division: Basidiobolomycota
- Class: Basidiobolomycetes
- Order: Basidiobolales
- Family: Basidiobolaceae
- Genus: Basidiobolus
- Species: B. philippinensis

Binomial name
- Basidiobolus philippinensis Josue & Quimio (1976)

Species of fungus

Basidiobolus philippinensis is a filamentous fungus found in the Philippines. It was first isolated in lizard dung.
