= ReNu =

ReNu is a brand of soft contact lens care products produced by Bausch & Lomb. By far the most popular brand of lens solutions until 2006, ReNu has rebranded its formulations as renu sensitive (formerly ReNu Multi-Purpose) and renu fresh (formerly ReNu MultiPlus), the latter containing a patented ingredient called hydranate, known by chemists as hydroxyalkylphosphonate, that removes protein deposits and can eliminate the need for a separate enzymatic cleaner.

== ReNu with MoistureLoc ==
The brand made headlines in 2006 when a report from the United States Centers for Disease Control and Prevention suggested an increased incidence of fungal keratitis in people using Bausch & Lomb products. Bausch & Lomb subsequently suspended, then recalled shipments of one particular product, ReNu with MoistureLoc. Other ReNu formulations were unaffected, as they do not include the special ingredient in MoistureLoc, which was supposed to keep lenses moist but unfortunately also allowed microbes to survive the disinfection process.

== Timeline ==
In November 2005, Hong Kong health officials told Bausch & Lomb about a significant increase in hospital admissions due to contact lens related keratitis from June to September 2005.

On March 3, 2006, New Jersey ophthalmologist Dr. David S. Chu contacted Bausch & Lomb to report that three of his patients had contracted a fungal infection called Fusarium keratitis; all three of these patients were contact lens wearers who used Bausch & Lomb's Renu with MoistureLoc. Subsequently, he also reported his findings to the Centers for Disease Control and Prevention on March 8, 2006.

On April 10, 2006, the CDC announced that it was investigating 109 patients in the United States suspected to have Fusarium keratitis. They reported that they had complete data available for 30 patients in this group, the earliest onset of infection of which was June 15, 2005.

On April 11, 2006, Bausch & Lomb stopped shipments of its ReNu with MoistureLoc contact lens solution from its Greenville, South Carolina, plant after the U.S. Centers for Disease Control and Prevention found what appeared to be a high correlation between use of the product and cases of suspected fungal keratitis. Similar claims had already been made against the product in Hong Kong and Singapore. The news about the U.S. suspension led to a 14.6% drop in the company's stock price—a drop of $8.41, to $49.03—the largest the company experienced in 5½ years.

On April 13, 2006, Bausch & Lomb announced that it is withdrawing the ReNu with MoistureLoc product world-wide and is recommending that consumers stop using ReNu with MoistureLoc immediately. The FDA supports this decision. The FDA, as well as the American Optometric Association, also advise now that contact lenses be rubbed and rinsed even when a no-rub contact lens solution is used.

According to a preliminary report released by the FDA on May 16, 2006, Bausch & Lomb failed to notify the FDA that Singapore's Ministry of Health reported 35 serious cases of Fusarium keratitis to Bausch & Lomb in February 2006.

The U.S. suspension does not include ReNu products without MoistureLoc. Only supplies of ReNu with MoistureLoc manufactured in the company's US plant are affected. European supplies are considered to be safe.

On March 7, 2007, Bausch & Lomb issued a voluntary recall on 1.5 million bottles of ReNu MultiPlus solution due to higher than normal amounts of iron in the batch.
