= Conidiobolomycosis =

Fungal infection

- Other names: Rhinoentomophthoromycosis
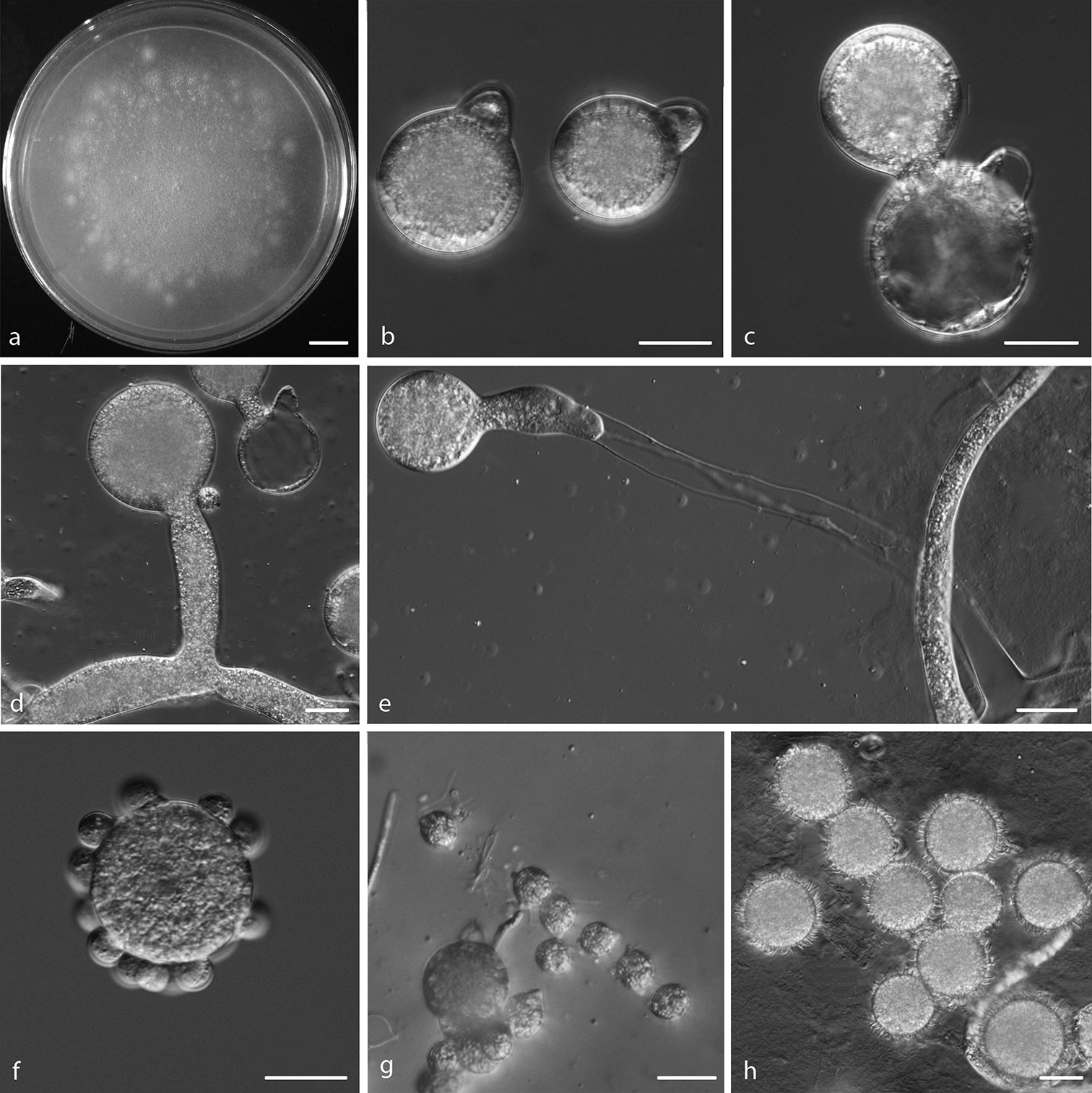
- Conidiobolus coronatus
- Specialty: Infectious disease
- Symptoms: Firm painless swelling in nose, sinuses, cheeks and upper lips, blocked nose, runny nose, nose bleed
- Complications: Facial disfigurement, partial or full blindness.; Severe disseminated disease if weak immune system
- Usual onset: Slowly progressive
- Duration: Long term
- Causes: fungi of the genus Conidiobolus
- Diagnostic method: Medical imaging, biopsy, microscopy, culture
- Differential diagnosis: Soft tissue tumors, Mucormycosis
- Treatment: Antifungals, surgical debridement
- Medication: oral Itraconazole, topical Potassium iodide Severe disease: intravenous Amphotericin B
- Prognosis: Longterm morbidity: facial disfigurement, good response to treatment
- Frequency: Rare, M>F adults>children
- Deaths: Rare

Conidiobolomycosis is a rare long-term fungal infection that is typically found just under the skin of the nose, sinuses, cheeks and upper lips. It may present with a nose bleed or a blocked or runny nose. Typically there is a firm painless swelling which can slowly extend to the nasal bridge and eyes, sometimes causing facial disfigurement.

Most cases are caused by Conidiobolus coronatus, a fungus found in soil and in the environment in general, which can infect healthy people. It is usually acquired by inhaling the spores of the fungus, but can be by direct infection through a cut in the skin such as an insect bite.

The extent of disease may be seen using medical imaging such as CT scanning of the nose and sinus. Diagnosis may be confirmed by biopsy, microscopy, culture and histopathology. Treatment is with long courses of antifungals and sometimes cutting out infected tissue. The condition has a good response to antifungal treatment, but can recur. The infection is rarely fatal.

The condition occurs more frequently in adults working or living in the tropical forests of South and Central America, West Africa and Southeast Asia. Males are affected more than females. The first case in a human was described in Jamaica in 1965.

== Signs and symptoms ==
The infection presents with firm lumps just under the skin of the nose, sinuses, upper lips, mouth and cheeks. The swelling is painless and may feel "woody". Sinus pain may occur. Infection may extend to involve the nasal bridge, face and eyes, sometimes resulting in facial disfigurement. The nose may feel blocked or have a discharge, and may bleed.

== Cause ==
Conidiobolomycosis is a type of Entomophthoromycosis, the other being basidiobolomycosis, and is caused by mainly Conidiobolus coronatus, but also Conidiobolus incongruus and Conidiobolus lamprauges

== Mechanism ==
Conidiobolomycosis chiefly affects the central face, usually beginning in the nose before extending onto paranasal sinuses, cheeks, upper lip and pharynx. The disease is acquired usually by breathing in the spores of the fungus, which then infect the tissue of the nose and paranasal sinuses, from where it slowly spreads. It can attach to underlying tissues, but not bone. It can be acquired by direct infection through a small cut in the skin such as an insect bite. Thrombosis, infarction of tissue and spread into blood vessels does not occur. Deep and systemic infection is possible in people with a weakened immune system. Infection causes a local chronic granulomatous reaction.

== Diagnosis ==
The condition is typically diagnosed after noticing facial changes. The extent of disease may be seen using medical imaging such as CT scanning of the nose and sinus. Diagnosis can be confirmed by biopsy, microscopy, and culture. Histology reveals wide but thin-walled fungal filaments with branching at right-angles. There are only a few septae. The fungus is fragile and hence rarely isolated. An immunoallergic reaction might be observed, where a local antigen–antibody reaction causes eosinophils and hyaline material to surround the organism. Molecular methods may also be used to identify the fungus.

=== Differential diagnosis ===
Differential diagnosis includes soft tissue tumors. Other conditions that may appear similar include mucormycosis, cellulitis, rhinoscleroma and lymphoma.

== Treatment ==
Treatment is with long courses of antifungals and sometimes cutting out infected tissue. Generally, treatment is with triazoles, preferably itraconazole. A second choice is potassium iodide, either alone or combined with itraconazole. In severe widespread disease, amphotericin B may be an option. The condition has a good response to antifungal treatment, but can recur. The infection is rarely fatal but often disfiguring.

== Epidemiology ==
The disease is rare, occurring mainly in those working or living in the tropical forests of West Africa, Southeast Asia, South and Central America, as well India, Saudi Arabia and Oman. Conidiobolus species have been found in areas of high humidity such as the coasts of the United Kingdom, eastern United States and West Africa.

Adults are affected more than children. Males are affected more than females.

== History ==
The condition was first reported in 1961 in horses in Texas. The first case in a human was described in 1965 in Jamaica. Previously this genus was thought to only infect insects.

== Other animals ==
Conidiobolomycosis affects spiders, termites and other arthropods. The condition has been described in dogs, horses, sheep and other mammals. Affected mammals typically present with irregular lumps in one or both nostrils that cause obstruction, bloody nasal discharge and noisy abnormal breathing.
