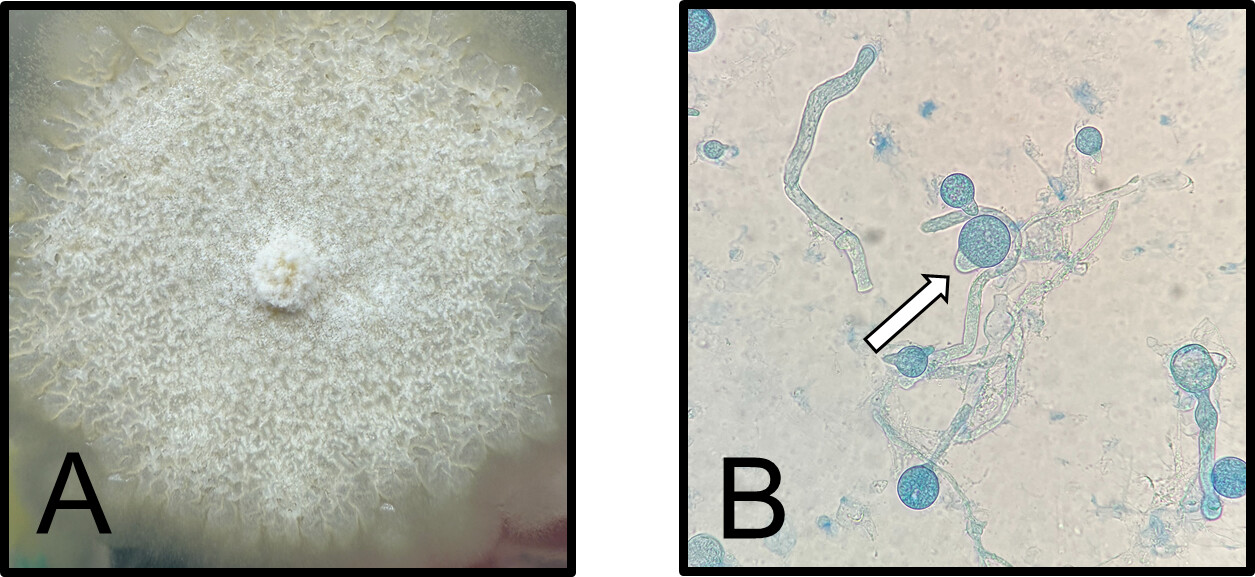
- Macroscopic examination of mold isolated from sputum grown on Sabouraud dextrose agar after 3 days at 30 °C. Lactophenol blue preparation of mold examined at ×40.

Scientific classification
- Kingdom: Fungi
- Division: Entomophthoromycota
- Class: Entomophthoromycetes
- Order: Entomophthorales
- Family: Ancylistaceae
- Genus: Conidiobolus
- Species: C. incongruus

Binomial name
- Conidiobolus incongruus Drechsler

= Conidiobolus incongruus =

Species of fungus

Conidiobolus incongruus is a member of the genus Conidiobolus.

It is one of the three known Conidiobolus species (the other two being C. coronatus and C. lamprauges) associated with conidiobolomycosis.

C. incongruus are thermophilic fungi and are commonly found in the soil and decaying plant matter of tropical and subtropical areas. They are most prevalent in Africa, South America and Southeast Asia. In the conditions of high humidity, sunlight, and high temperatures, their sticky conidia are ejected and attach to the skin of passing insects or animals, including mammals. They infect their hosts either through the inhalation of spores or through the conidia invading open skin and small abrasions in the intestinal tract.

== Taxonomic characteristics ==
C. incongruus can be readily identified in culture by the development of spherical yellowish zygospores, 15–40 μm in diameter. Each zygospore contains numerous globules on maturation and are of large size. The multiple globules within the zygospore of C. incongruus are the features that can be used to differentiate the species from C. lampragues, which produces smaller zygospores (12–18 μm in size) that contain homogeneous single globules.

C. incongruus does not develop villose conidia on water agar cultures, a characteristic that it shares with C. lampragues and differentiates it from C. incongruus, which does produce villose conidia.

== Medical relevance ==
There have been several case reports of invasive conidiobolomycosis caused by C. incongruus, diagnosed in both apparently normal and immunocompromised hosts. Infections present most commonly as chronic sinusitis, and if untreated, infection can extend to adjacent facial and subcutaneous tissues. However, a significant clinical difference between C. incongruus and the other pathogenic Conidiobolus species is the frequency of systemic involvement, with C. incongruus more likely to affect multiple organ systems than the other species.

The anatomic area most commonly affected by Conidiobolus species is the face (generally around the nose), which is in contrast to Basidiobolus species, which are more frequently found on the limbs and the intestinal tract.

There is no complete consensus for treatment, in part due to the rarity of infection. A high level of in vitro azole resistance has been reported. Treatment has included combinations of azoles, amphotericin B, trimethoprim-sulfamethoxazole, potassium iodide, terbinafine, hyperbaric oxygen, and surgical debridement, with varying success.
