= Global Action Fund for Fungal Infections =

International charitable foundation

Global Action For Fungal Infections
- Abbreviation: GAFFI
- Purpose: Raise awareness of and collect data on fungal disease; To make reliable and inexpensive diagnostic tests widely available
- Locations: Geneva, Switzerland; Altrincham, Cheshire, United Kingdom
- Fields: Fungal disease
- Board Chair: Oddi Aasheim
- Website: Official website

The Global Action For Fungal Infections (GAFFI) is an international foundation focussed on raising awareness of and collecting worldwide data on fungal disease. Its aim is to make reliable and inexpensive diagnostic tests widely available.

In 2015, GAFFI proposed action to make affordable fungal diagnostic tests and antifungal treatments available to 95% of the world's population by 2025. In 2018 GAFFI calculated that globally around one billion people have fungal infections of the skin, more than one million people become blind from fungal keratitis, more than 10 million people develop lung disease after breathing in fungal spores, and more than 300 million people have a severe fungal infection every year, of whom over 1.5 million die.

== Location and members ==
The GAFFI is based in Switzerland and the United Kingdom. Its Board Chair is Oddi Aasheim.

== Aims ==
GAFFI is an international foundation focussed on raising awareness of and collecting worldwide data on fungal disease burden. Its primary aims are to get reliable and inexpensive diagnostic tests to be widely available, particularly in low and middle income countries. The tests can be produced but the increasing cost of regulatory approval causes difficulty in getting them from the experimental stage in the laboratory to real world use in clinics.

== Activities ==
GAFFI has successfully advocated for multiple diagnostics as Essential to be listed on the World Health Organization's EDL. GAFFI tracks country registration and access to Essential Medicines for antifungal agents. GAFFI also estimates and publicises data on fungal diseases incidence and prevalence (burden).

The GAFFI was launched in London in 2013. In 2015, GAFFI proposed action to make fungal diagnostic tests and antifungal treatments available to 95% of the world's population by 2025 95/95 by 2025. Six actions were proposed:

- Provide rapid diagnostic tests that do not rely on culture, and that are affordable.
- Establish at least one laboratory in each country, led by fungal disease experts
- Create clinical guidelines and teaching programmes
- Better distribution of antifungal medicines on the WHO Model List of Essential Medicines
- Establish fungal infection surveillance systems
- Invest in public health mycology

In 2018 the GAFFI calculated that globally around one billion people every year have fungal infections of the skin, more than one million people become blind from fungal keratitis, more than 10 million people develop lung disease after breathing in fungal spores, and more than 300 million people have severe fungal infections, of which over 1.5 million will die from it.

In 2022, GAFFI published a report on access to diagnostics in 49 African countries, with the Africa Centre for Disease Control and Prevention. Many gaps remain.
