= Lagenidiosis =

Lagenidiosis is a type of infectious disease caused by a species of Lagenidium that has not yet been properly named. Lagenidiosis is found in the southeastern United States in lakes and ponds. It causes progressive skin and subcutaneous lesions in the legs, groin, trunk, and near the tail. The lesions are firm nodules or ulcerated regions with draining tracts. Regional lymph nodes are usually swollen. Spread of the disease to distant lymph nodes, large blood vessels, and the lungs may occur. Invasion and subsequent aneurysm of a great vessel can cause death.
