= Entomophthoramycosis =

- Specialty: Infectious diseases

Entomophthoramycosis (or Entomophthoromycosis) is a mycosis caused by Entomophthorales.

Examples include basidiobolomycosis and conidiobolomycosis.

== Diagnosis ==
A culture of the infected tissue of the individual suspected of having Entomophthoramycosis

== Treatment ==
Treatment for phycomycosis is very difficult and includes surgery when possible. Postoperative recurrence is common. Antifungal drugs show only limited effect on the disease, but itraconazole and terbinafine hydrochloride are often used for two to three months following surgery. Humans with Basidiobolus infections have been treated with amphotericin B and potassium iodide. For pythiosis and lagenidiosis, a new drug targeting water moulds called caspofungin is available, but it is very expensive. Immunotherapy has been used successfully in humans and horses with pythiosis. Treatment for skin lesions is traditionally with potassium iodide, but itraconazole has also been used successfully.
