= Streptomyces lienomycini =

Scientific classification
- Domain: Bacteria
- Kingdom: Bacillati
- Phylum: Actinomycetota
- Class: Actinomycetes
- Order: Streptomycetales
- Family: Streptomycetaceae
- Genus: Streptomyces
- Species: S. lienomycini

Binomial name
- Streptomyces lienomycini Gause and Maximova 1986

Type strain
- ATCC 43687, CGMCC 4.1895, DSM 41475, IFO 15425, INA 478, JCM 6925, LMG 20091, NBRC 15425, NRRL B-16371, VKM Ac-1767, VTT E-072712

Species of bacterium

Streptomyces lienomycini is a bacterium species from the genus of Streptomyces.

== See also ==
- List of Streptomyces species
