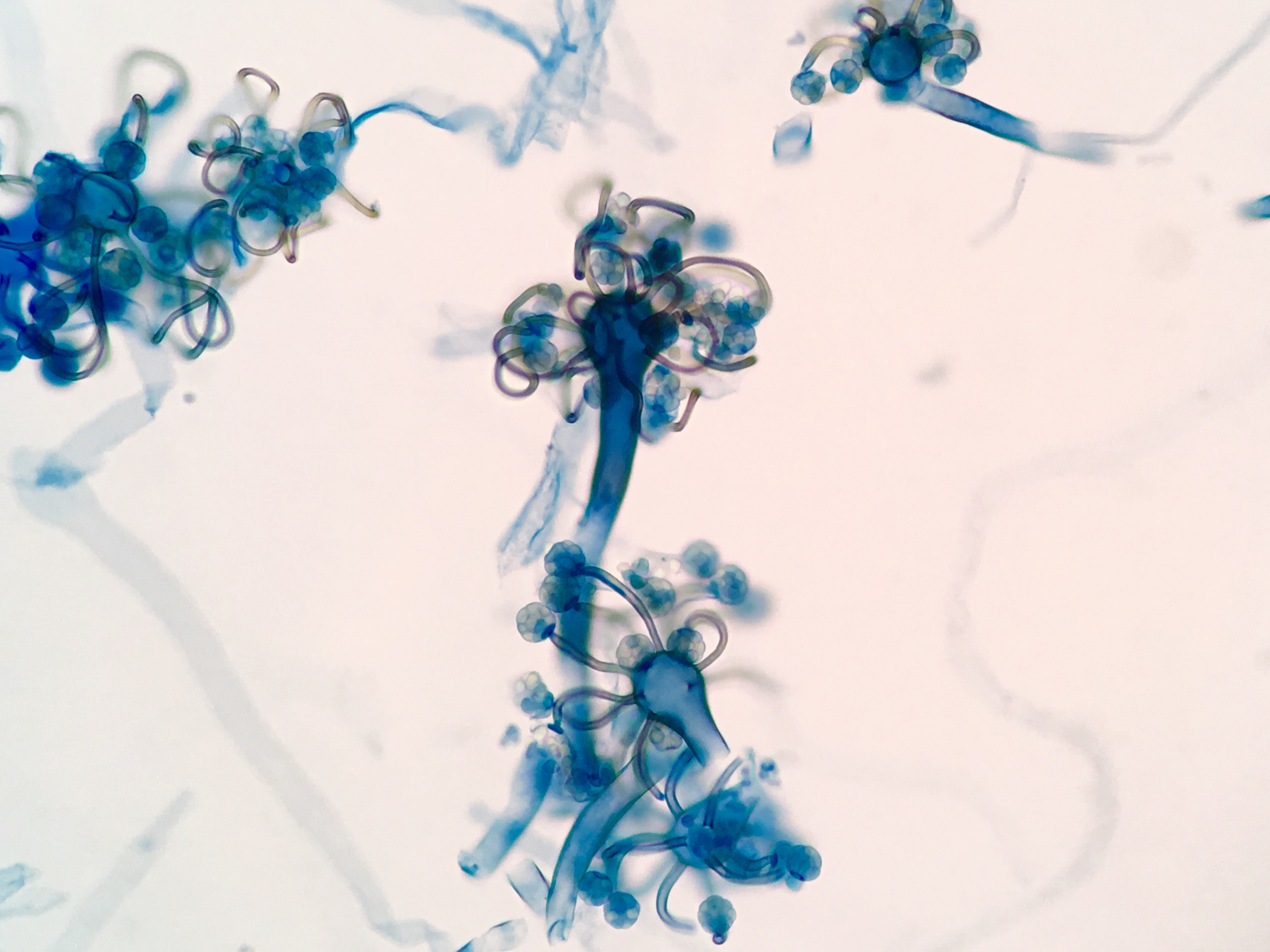

Scientific classification
- Kingdom: Fungi
- Order: Mucorales
- Family: Thamnidiaceae
- Genus: Cokeromyces Shanor
- Species: C. recurvatus

Binomial name
- Cokeromyces recurvatus Poitras (1950)

= Cokeromyces =

Species of fungus

Cokeromyces recurvatus is a pathogenic fungus. Described as a new species in 1950, it was isolated from rabbit dung collected in Illinois. It is the only species in the genus Cokeromyces.

The genus name of Cokeromyces is in honour of William Chambers Coker (1872 – 1953), was an American botanist and mycologist.

The genus was circumscribed by Leland Shanor in Mycologia Vol.42 (Issue 2) on page 272 in 1950.

It appears similar to Coccidioides immitis.
