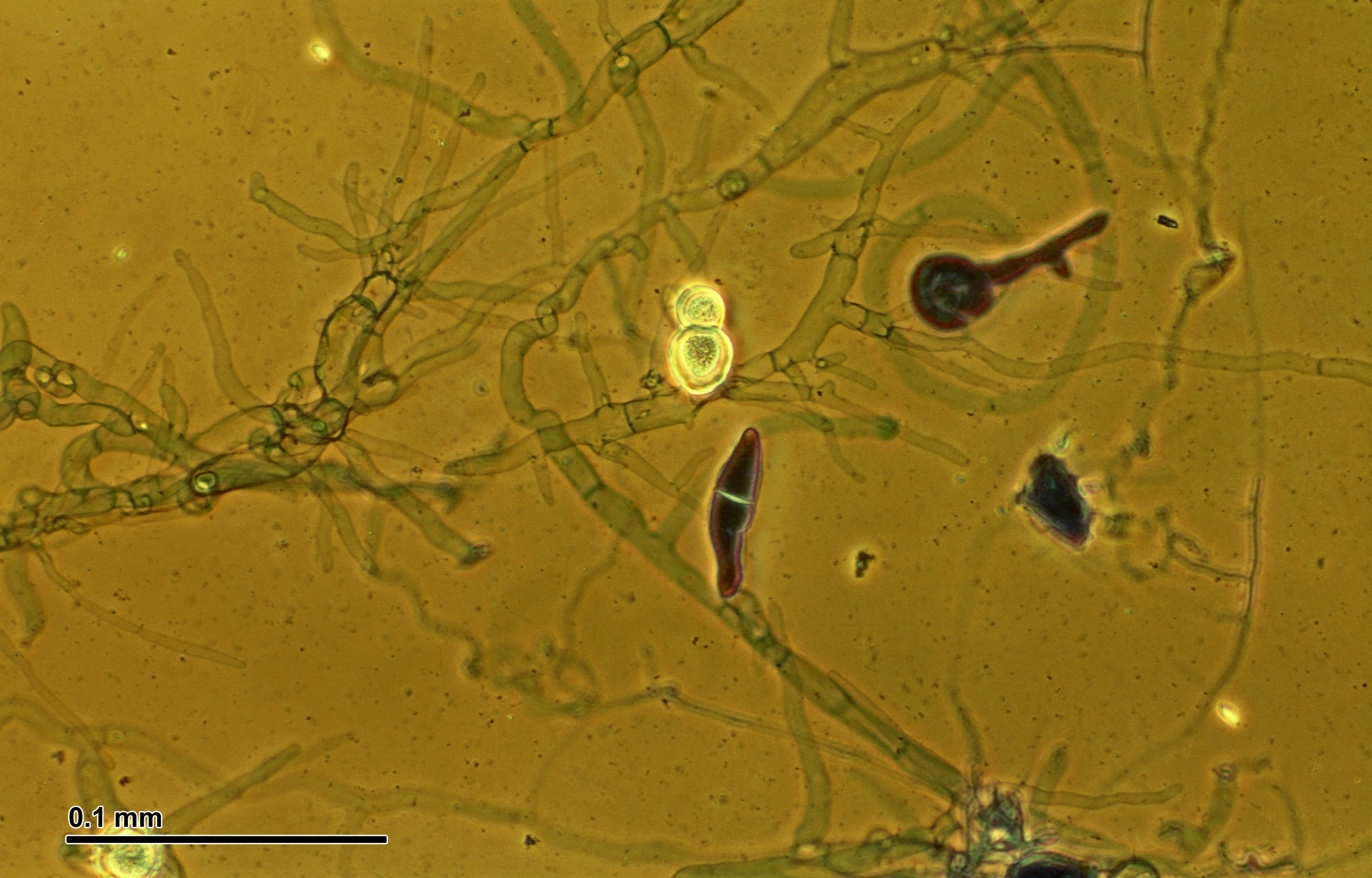

Scientific classification
- Kingdom: Fungi
- Division: Basidiobolomycota
- Class: Basidiobolomycetes
- Order: Basidiobolales
- Family: Basidiobolaceae
- Genus: Basidiobolus
- Species: B. ranarum

Binomial name
- Basidiobolus ranarum Eidam (1886)

Synonyms
- Basidiobolus haptosporus Drechsler (1947); Basidiobolus meristosporus Drechsler (1955)

= Basidiobolus ranarum =

Species of fungus

Basidiobolus ranarum is a filamentous fungus with worldwide distribution. The fungus was first isolated by Eidam in 1886. It can saprophytically live in the intestines of mainly cold-blooded vertebrates and on decaying fruits and soil. The fungus prefers glucose as a carbon source and grows rapidly at room temperature. Basidiobolus ranarum is also known as a cause of subcutaneous zygomycosis, usually causing granulomatous infections on a host's limbs. Infections are generally geographically limited to tropical and subtropical regions such as East and West Africa. Subcutaneous zygomycosis caused by B. ranarum is a rare disease and predominantly affects children and males. Common subcutaneous zygomycosis shows characteristic features and is relatively easy to be diagnosed; while, certain rare cases might show non-specific clinical features that might pose a difficulty on its identification. Although disease caused by this fungus is known to resolve spontaneously on its own, there are a number of treatments available.

== History ==
In 1886, the fungus was first isolated from the dung and intestinal contents of frogs by Eidam. In 1927, it was found in the intestines of toads, slowworms, and salamanders by Levisohn. In 1956, Joe et al. reported and described the first four cases of zygomycosis in Indonesia. Since then, hundreds of the cases of this infection have been reported. In 1955, Drechsler isolated it from decaying plants material in North America. In 1971, it was first isolated by Nickerson and Hutchison from aquatic animals, suggesting that B. ranarum can survive in a wild range of ecological situations.

== Physiology ==
At room temperature (25–30 °C), colonies of B. ranarum show very rapid growth and are able to reach a diameter of 75–80 mm in a week on suitable growth media. The favored carbohydrate source of this fungus is glucose that can stimulate the growth of its mycelium. Generally, asexual reproduction is favored by glucose and sexual reproduction is favored by acid amines. Primary asexual spores are singly formed on the apices of unbranched hyphae and will then be discharged to form ballistic spores. Secondary asexual spores are singly developed from a hypha that was generated from a geminated ballistic spore. Also, sporangiospores can be generated by internal cleave of the cytoplasm and can then be dispersed when the sporangial wall is dissolved. As a result, the ejected asexual spores can form satellite colonies in a distance. After around 10 days of growth, sexual spores, zygospores with 20–50 μm diameters can also be produced. This fungus is believed to have significant protease and lipase activity. Its lipase has a maximum activity at 35 °C and pH 6.0 while its protease has maximum activity at 30 °C and pH 5.5. Both enzymes might be involved in pathogenesis. Light does not affect hyphal growth light but may influence certain aspects of physiology. First, light may stimulate the production of the asexual spores, and certain blue lights (wavelengths 440 nm and 480 nm) may further stimulate the discharge of those spores. Second, light may also stimulate the induction of aerial hyphae and favor the unicellular configuration of the hyphae while darkness may favor their bicellular configuration.

== Morphology ==
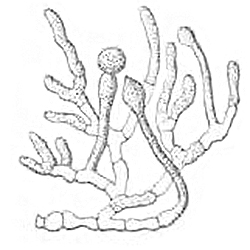
Gustav Lindau illustration of Basidiobolus ranarum

Colonies of B. ranarum are round, flat, waxy, glabrous and radially folded. And, their color is in a range of yellowish-grey to whitish-grey. A one-week-old colony can reach 75–80 mm in diameter. A white bloom, consisting of mycelia and sporangiospores, covers the colonies. Under microscope, younger hyphae are wide and have few septa. Older cultures have colorless zygospores (20–50 μm) with smooth, thick walls and abundant large, spherical, darkly coloured chlamydospores. The colonies commonly produce a strong Streptomyces-like or benzene hexachloride-like odour.

== Habitat and ecology ==
Basidiobolus ranarum has a worldwide distribution and is capable of living saprotrophically in a broad range of ecological situations, indicating its great ecological and physiological tolerance as well as its ubiquity. Basidiobolus ranarum was widely reported from all parts of the world, especially Asia and Africa. It can saprophytically live in the intestines of vertebrates including amphibians (e.g. frogs, toads, salamanders, mudpuppy), reptiles (e.g. chameleons, wall geckoes, snakes, lizards, turtles), and fishes (e.g. sturgeon). In addition, studies also reported occasional presence of B. ranarum in the intestinal contents of mammals such as one bat in India and the kangaroos in Australia. Moreover, other habitats including compost heaps, decaying plant material and soil can also be their place to live. However, the habitat for B. ranarum is not fixed and a life-cycle illustration of it might provide a better idea of the variation of its habitats. First, insects might eat feces and decaying plant materials in which B. ranarum might be present, or insects might have physical contact with the strains so that the strains can attach to the insects externally. Then, those insects might be devoured by predators, such as frogs. Next, the fungi will travel through the predator's gastrointestinal tract and might either stay a little bit longer (as long as 18 days) at or leave from the intestine along with the feces. Eventually, the strains in those feces will end up in the soil and some of them will be further transported to decaying plant materials or other organic contents. Also, the tissues that the pathogenic strains of B. ranarum infect can also be considered as its habitats, B. ranarum can also live in both human and non-human animal (e.g. horses, frogs) tissues. However, instead of a worldwide distribution, the pathogenic lifestyle of B. ranarum only exists in tropical and subtropical regions.

== Pathology ==
Subcutaneous zygomycosis (also known as "entomophthoromycosis basidiobolae", subcutaneous phycomycosis, and basidiobolomycosis) is a both human and non-human animal disease or lesion caused by the granulomatous infection of subcutaneous tissue by B. ranarum. Several enzymes produced by B. ranarum, including lipase and protease, might hydrolyze and utilize the fatty tissues of the host and contribute to the pathogenesis of the infection.

=== Prevalence, mode of transmission ===
Considering the broad-range distribution of B. ranarum and its high ubiquity, subcutaneous zygomycosis is not really prevalent. In addition, the fact that infections were only reported at tropical and subtropical regions further limits its prevalence. Currently, the reason why the infections were limited to those regions is not fully understood. However, the low prevalence might be explained by the speculations that the widespread immunity of other species was developed against its infection or the number of the B. ranarum strains with pathogenic characteristics is much lower than the saprophytic strains. Its transmission mode has not been fully understood though certain general ideas about its transmission are widely accepted. Ingestion of B. ranarum is thought to help disperse the agent through the deposition of feces at a distant place where human and other non-human animals might be exposed. As well, the agent may transmit through traumas or insect bites on skin.

=== Vulnerable groups ===
Most of the reported cases were from Nigeria and Uganda in Africa as well as Indonesia and thus the residents there might be considered as one of the vulnerable groups. Over 90% of the reported infections occurred on the people under 20 years old; thus the young are thought to be a particularly vulnerable group for this agent. Based on the skewed male to female ratio of infection reported in Nigeria (3:1) and Uganda (3:2), males are substantially more vulnerable to infection. One explanation that has been offered for this observation suggests that male children in endemic regions areas were likely to use decayed leaves which might be associated with pathogenic B. ranarum strains as toilet paper following defecation. Although rarely, the agent can cause gastrointestinal disease which does not show specific vulnerable groups or risk factors.

=== Clinical features and diagnosis ===
In general, the clinical presentation of subcutaneous zygomycosis is quite identifiable and characteristic and the diagnosis is fairly easy. Human infection is characterized by the single formation of enlarging, painless and firm swelling in soft tissues on extremities e.g. buttocks, thighs, perineum, trunk. However, as the infection worsens, symptoms such a burning sensation or itchiness may develop in the swollen region. In addition to general severe symptoms, one unusual case reported that the severe perineal infection of a led to acute large intestinal obstruction. Moreover, other rare cases also reported the infections happened on other anatomical regions such as the colon in the case of gastrointestinal basidiobolomycosis. Infections may be associated with a diffusive bluish pigmentation generally associated with swelling. Joint function is often not affected; however, a few other cases reported the subcutaneous infection transfect local muscle tissues and lymph nodes.

Definitive diagnosis requires laboratory effort. Culture, histopathology and immunology can be used to for the diagnosis. First, a portion of the infected tissue will be surgically removed and used for a biopsy. Since the fungus can not tolerate refrigeration, the biopsied material needs to be incubated immediately once it is collected. Then, the examination will investigate the presence of thin-walled, wide, hyaline, coenocytic hyphae and internal cleavage for the production of the sporangiospores in H&E (Haemotoxylin and Eosin) stained sections. Other characteristics of its appearance mentioned in the morphology section might also be used to identify the species. Moreover, the histopathology test will expect a granuloma consisting of a variety of immune cells in which hypha or hyphal fragments (4–10 μm diameter) often stain bright pink in H&E sections. When biopsy is not available, immunofluorescent test can also be used to identify B. ranarum strains. Five specific antigens have been identified that can be used measured in the sera of the infected patients using antibodies conjugated to fluorescein dye. The diagnosis of the rare cases, such as gastrointestinal basidiobolomycosis, is challenging given the nonspecific clinical presentation as well as the need for surgical biopsy.

=== Treatment ===
Many cases are thought to resolve spontaneously, although surgical intervention may be help to debulk the infected tissue. The most common treatment is taking potassium iodide (KI) on a daily basis for a half of a year to one-year period. For the patients who can not response to KI, some successful cases with other treatments also reported that medications including cotrimoxazole, amphotericin B, itraconazole, and ketoconazole might also show beneficial effects. In addition, given the fact that Conidiobolus coronatus infection causes a similar disease as B. ranarum infection does, coupled with the fact that fluconazole shows great effects on treating C. coronatus infection, there might be a possibility that fluconazole will also be effective in treating B. ranarum infection.
