= Lagenidium =

Scientific classification
- Domain: Eukaryota
- Supergroup: Stramenopiles
- Division: Oomycota
- Class: Peronosporomycetes
- Order: Peronosporales
- Family: Pythiaceae
- Genus: Lagenidium; Schenk, 1859

Genus of single-celled organisms

Lagenidium is a genus of Oomycota. It includes the now deregistered biological control agent Lagenidium giganteum.

Certain species can cause lagenidiosis.
