= Fungal infection =

Disease caused by fungi to animals or humans

Mycosis
- Other names: Mycoses, fungal disease, fungal infection ICD-10CM codes: Mycoses B35-B49
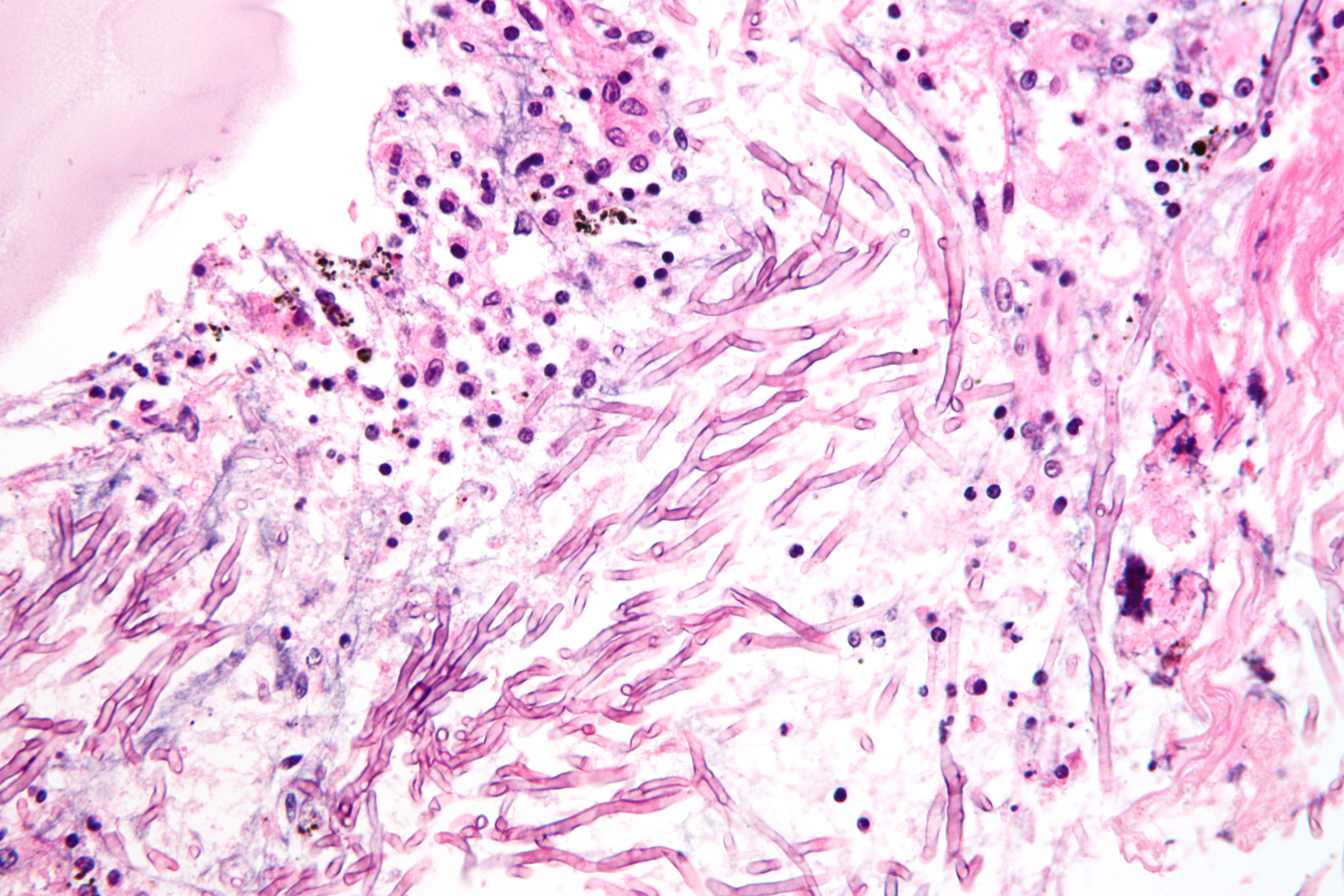
- Micrograph showing a mycosis (aspergillosis). The Aspergillus (which is spaghetti-like) is seen in the center and surrounded by inflammatory cells and necrotic debris. H&E stain.
- Specialty: Infectious Diseases
- Types: Systemic, superficial, subcutaneous
- Causes: Pathogenic fungus: dermatophytes, yeasts, molds
- Risk factors: Immunodeficiency, cancer treatment, large surface area wounds/burns, organ transplant, COVID-19, tuberculosis
- Diagnostic method: Based on symptoms, culture, microscopic examination
- Treatment: Antifungals
- Frequency: Common
- Deaths: 1.7 million (2020)

Fungal infection, also known as mycosis, is a disease caused by fungi. Different types are traditionally divided according to the part of the body affected: superficial, subcutaneous, and systemic. Superficial fungal infections include common tinea of the skin, such as tinea of the body, groin, hands, feet and beard, and yeast infections such as pityriasis versicolor. Subcutaneous types include eumycetoma and chromoblastomycosis, which generally affect tissues in and beneath the skin. Systemic fungal infections are more serious and include cryptococcosis, histoplasmosis, pneumocystis pneumonia, aspergillosis and mucormycosis. Signs and symptoms range widely. There is usually a rash with superficial infection. Fungal infection within the skin or under the skin may present with a lump and skin changes. Pneumonia-like symptoms or meningitis may occur with a deeper or systemic infection.

Fungi are everywhere, but only some cause disease. Fungal infection occurs after spores are either breathed in, come into contact with skin or enter the body through the skin such as via a cut, wound or injection. It is more likely to occur in people with a weak immune system. This includes people with illnesses such as HIV/AIDS, and people taking medicines such as steroids or cancer treatments. Fungi that cause infections in people include yeasts, molds and fungi that are able to exist as both a mold and yeast. The yeast Candida albicans can live in people without producing symptoms, and is able to cause both superficial mild candidiasis in healthy people, such as oral thrush or vaginal yeast infection, and severe systemic candidiasis in those who cannot fight infection themselves.

Diagnosis is generally based on signs and symptoms, microscopy, culture, sometimes requiring a biopsy and the aid of medical imaging. Some superficial fungal infections of the skin can appear similar to other skin conditions such as eczema and lichen planus. Treatment is generally performed using antifungal medicines, usually in the form of a cream or by mouth or injection, depending on the specific infection and its extent. Some require surgically cutting out infected tissue.

Fungal infections have a world-wide distribution and are common, affecting more than one billion people every year. An estimated 1.7 million deaths from fungal disease were reported in 2020. Several, including sporotrichosis, chromoblastomycosis and mycetoma are neglected.

A wide range of fungal infections occur in other animals, and some can be transmitted from animals to people.

== Classification ==
Mycoses are traditionally divided into superficial, subcutaneous, or systemic, where infection is deep, more widespread and involving internal body organs. They can affect the nails, vagina, skin and mouth. Some types such as blastomycosis, cryptococcus, coccidioidomycosis and histoplasmosis, affect people who live in or visit certain parts of the world. Others such as aspergillosis, pneumocystis pneumonia, candidiasis, mucormycosis and talaromycosis, tend to affect people who are unable to fight infection themselves. Mycoses might not always conform strictly to the three divisions of superficial, subcutaneous and systemic. Some superficial fungal infections can cause systemic infections in people who are immunocompromised. Some subcutaneous fungal infections can invade into deeper structures, resulting in systemic disease. Candida albicans can live in people without producing symptoms, and is able to cause both mild candidiasis in healthy people and severe invasive candidiasis in those who cannot fight infection themselves.

=== ICD-11 codes ===
ICD-11 codes include:

- 1F20 Aspergillosis
- 1F21 Basidiobolomycosis
- 1F22 Blastomycosis
- 1F23 Candidosis
- 1F24 Chromoblastomycosis
- 1F25 Coccidioidomycosis
- 1F26 Conidiobolomycosis
- 1F27 Cryptococcosis
- 1F28 Dermatophytosis
- 1F29 Eumycetoma
- 1F2A Histoplasmosis
- 1F2B Lobomycosis
- 1F2C Mucormycosis
- 1F2D Non-dermatophyte superficial dermatomycoses
- 1F2E Paracoccidioidomycosis
- 1F2F Phaeohyphomycosis
- 1F2G Pneumocystosis
- 1F2H Scedosporiosis
- 1F2J Sporotrichosis
- 1F2K Talaromycosis
- 1F2L Emmonsiosis

=== Superficial mycoses ===
Superficial mycoses include candidiasis in healthy people, common tinea of the skin, such as tinea of the body, groin, hands, feet and beard, and malassezia infections such as pityriasis versicolor.

Oral candidiasis

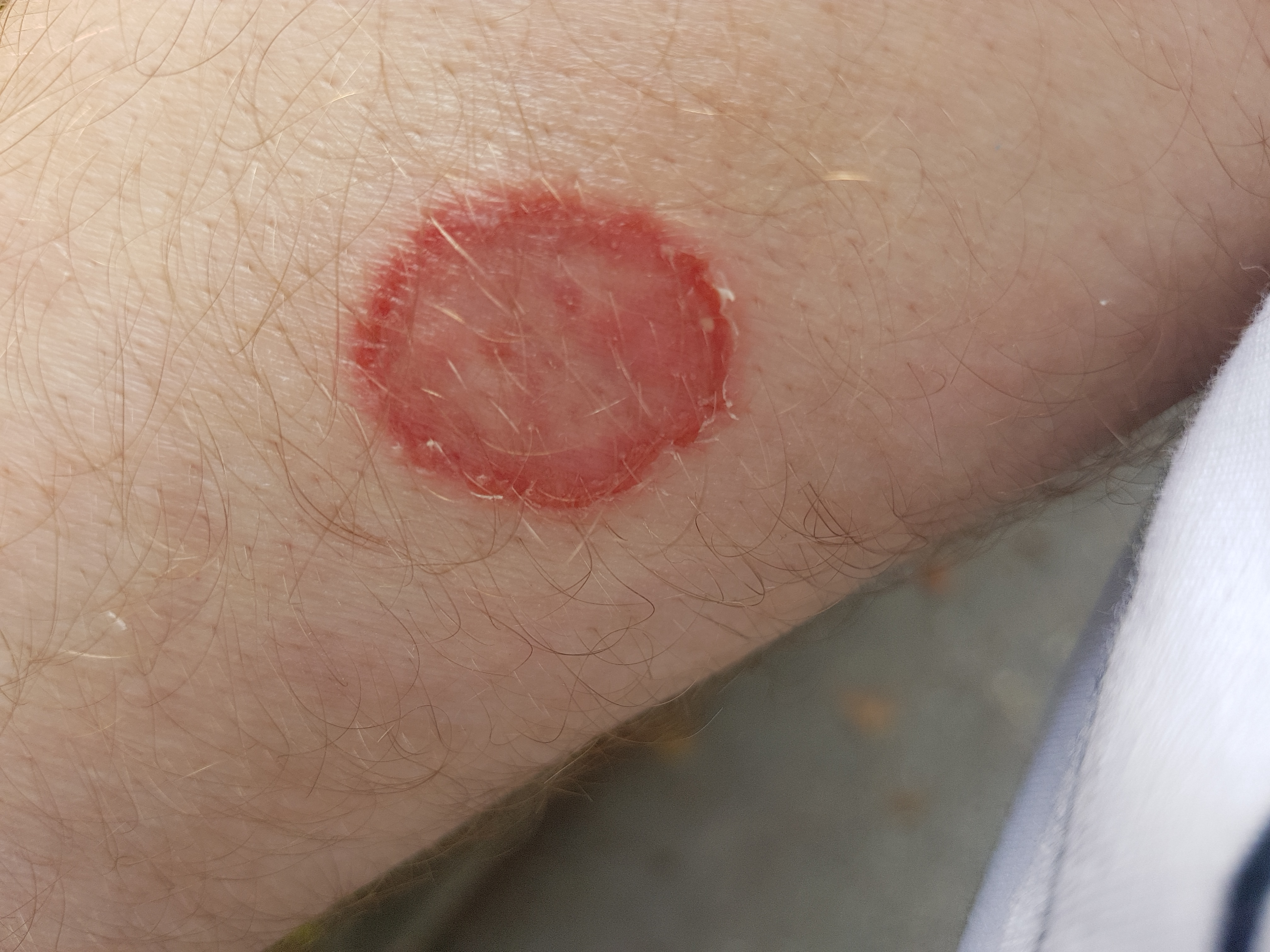
Tinea corporis

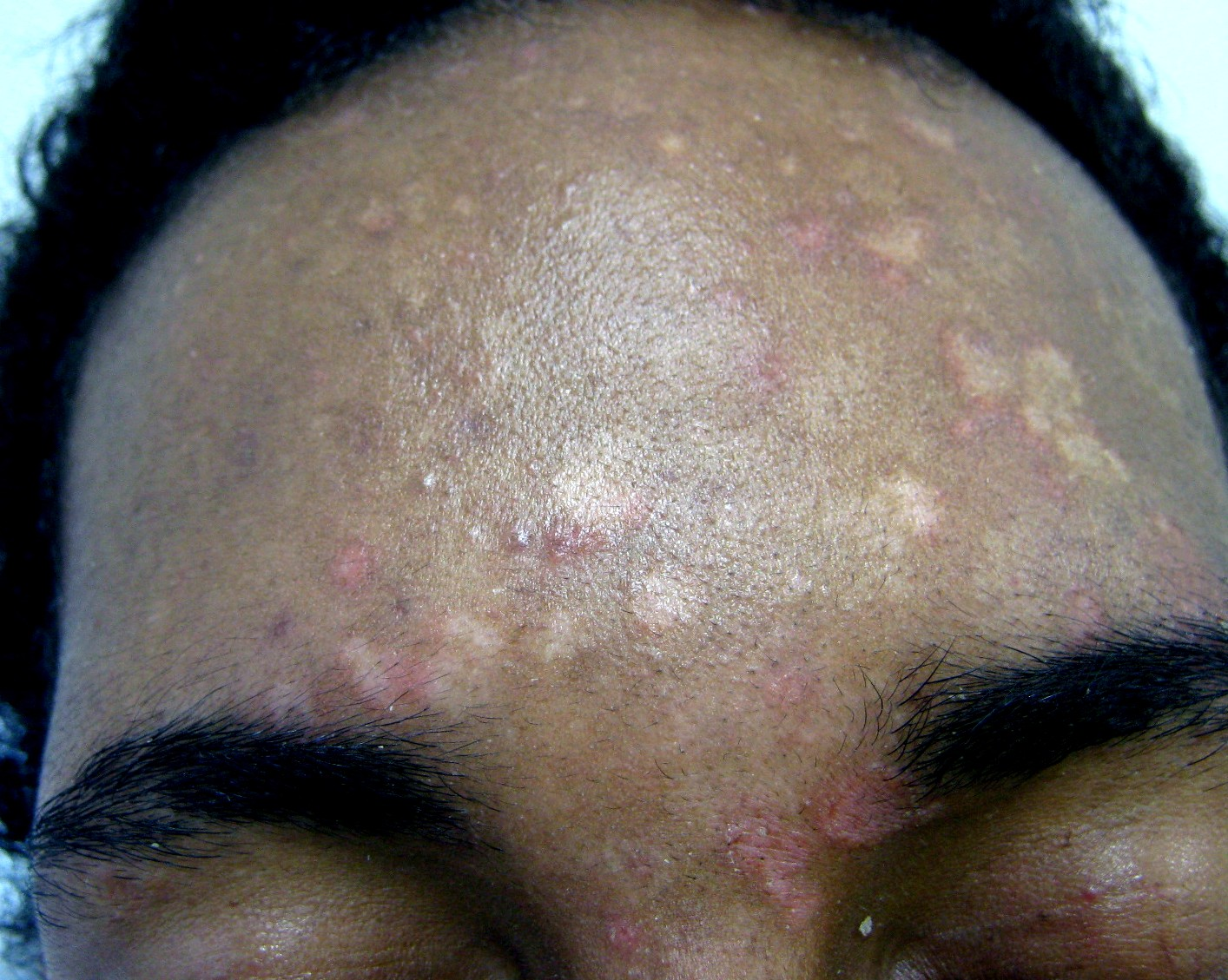
Pityriasis versicolor

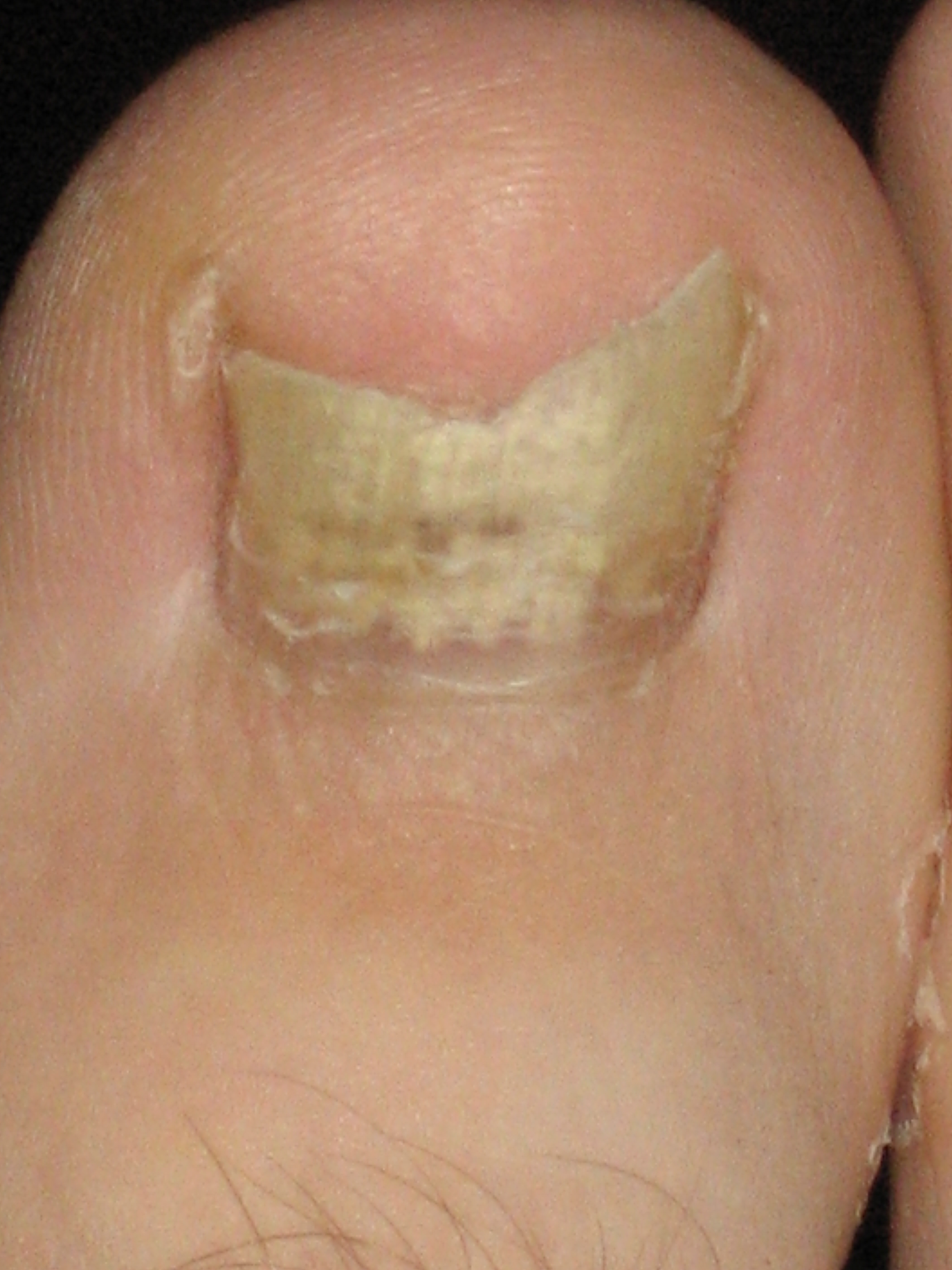
Onychomycosis

=== Subcutaneous ===
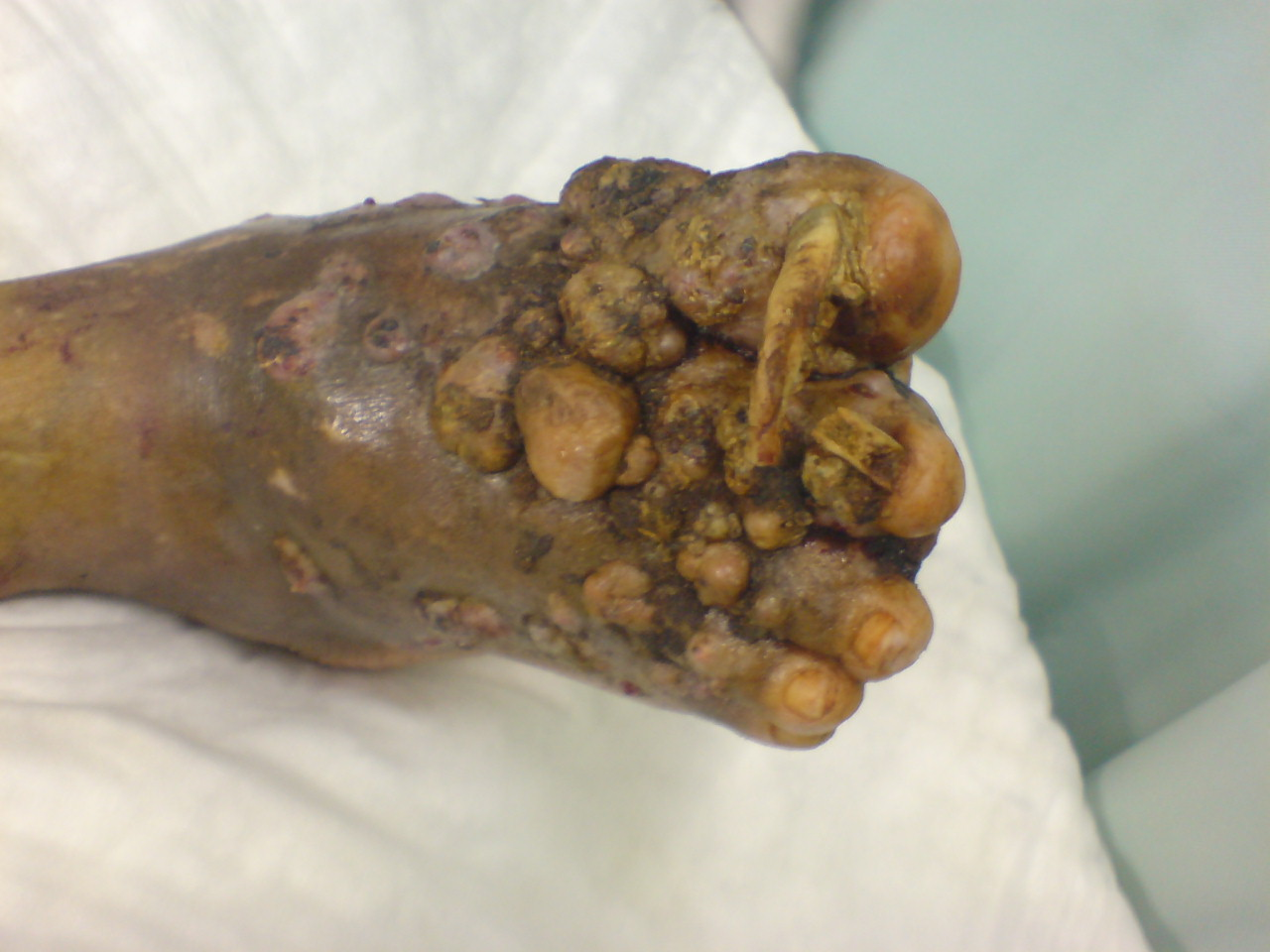
Eumycetoma

Subcutaneous fungal infections include sporotrichosis, chromoblastomycosis, and eumycetoma.

=== Systemic ===
Systemic fungal infections include histoplasmosis, cryptococcosis, coccidioidomycosis, blastomycosis, mucormycosis, aspergillosis, pneumocystis pneumonia and systemic candidiasis.

Systemic mycoses due to primary pathogens originate normally in the lungs and may spread to other organ systems. Organisms that cause systemic mycoses are inherently virulent.. Systemic mycoses due to opportunistic pathogens are infections of people with immune deficiencies who would otherwise not be infected. Examples of immunocompromised conditions include AIDS, alteration of normal flora by antibiotics, immunosuppressive therapy, and metastatic cancer. Examples of opportunistic mycoses include Candidiasis, Cryptococcosis and Aspergillosis.

== Signs and symptoms ==
Most common mild mycoses often present with a rash. Infections within the skin or under the skin may present with a lump and skin changes. Less common deeper fungal infections may present with pneumonia-like symptoms or meningitis.

== Causes ==
Mycoses are caused by certain fungi; yeasts, molds and some fungi that can exist as both a mold and yeast. They are everywhere and infection occurs after spores are either breathed in, come into contact with skin or enter the body through the skin such as via a cut, wound or injection. Candida albicans is the most common cause of fungal infection in people, particularly as oral or vaginal thrush, often following taking antibiotics.

=== Risk factors ===
Fungal infections are more likely in people with weak immune systems. This includes people with illnesses such as HIV/AIDS, and people taking medicines such as steroids or cancer treatments. People with diabetes also tend to develop fungal infections. Very young and very old people, also, are groups at risk.

Individuals being treated with antibiotics are at higher risk of fungal infections.

Children whose immune systems are not functioning properly (such as children with cancer) are at risk of invasive fungal infections.

=== COVID-19 ===
During the COVID-19 pandemic some fungal infections have been associated with COVID-19. Fungal infections can mimic COVID-19 and occur at the same time as COVID-19, and more serious fungal infections can complicate COVID-19. A fungal infection may occur after antibiotics for a bacterial infection which has occurred following COVID-19. The most common serious fungal infections in people with COVID-19 include aspergillosis and invasive candidiasis. COVID-19–associated mucormycosis is generally less common, but in 2021 was noted to be significantly more prevalent in India.

== Mechanism ==
Fungal infections occur after spores are breathed in, come into contact with skin or enter the body through a wound.

== Diagnosis ==
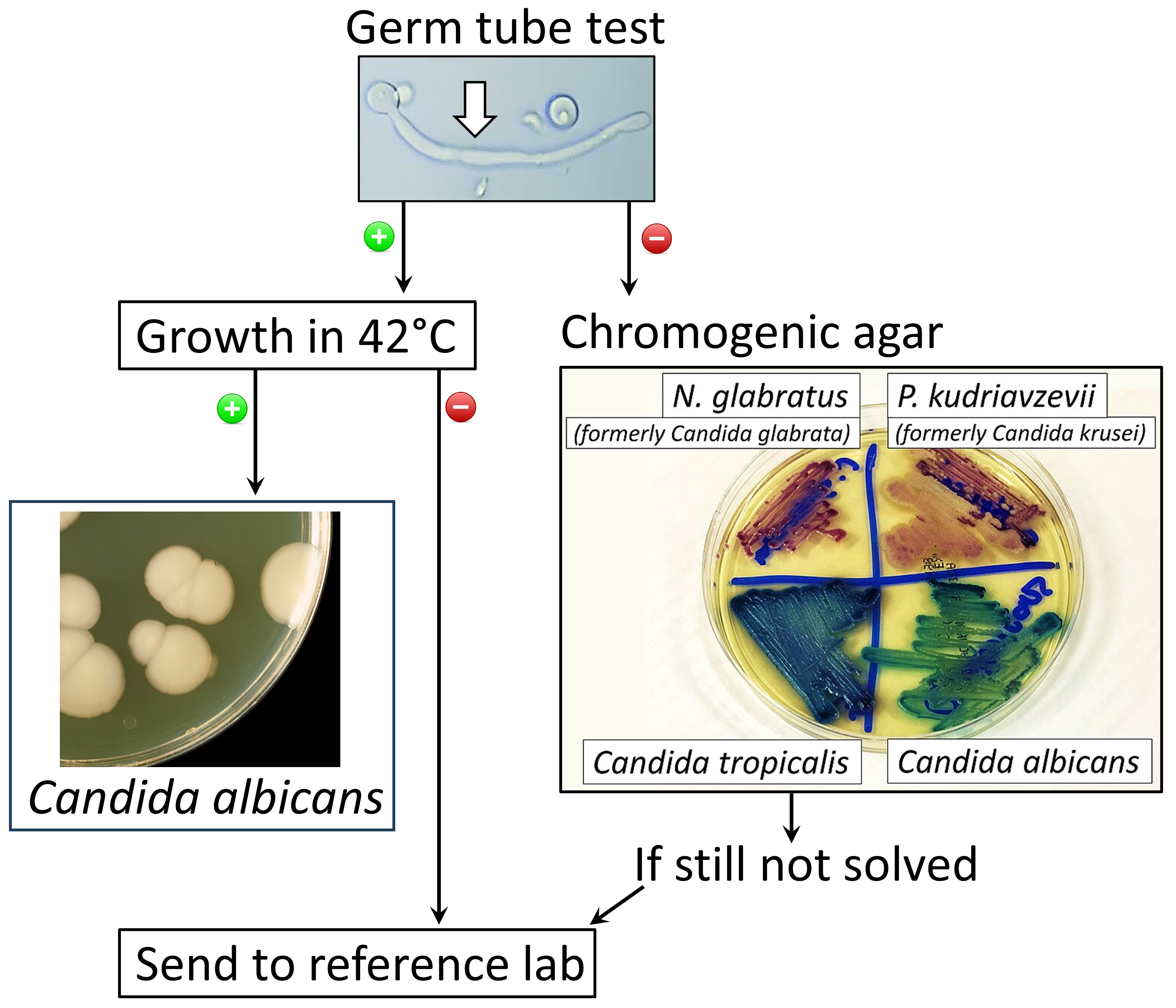
Workup algorithm of fungal infection at a microbiology lab at a New England community hospital.

Diagnosis is generally by signs and symptoms, microscopy, biopsy, culture and sometimes with the aid of medical imaging.

=== Differential diagnosis ===
Some tinea and candidiasis infections of the skin can appear similar to eczema and lichen planus. Pityriasis versicolor can look like seborrheic dermatitis, pityriasis rosea, pityriasis alba and vitiligo.

Some fungal infections such as coccidioidomycosis, histoplasmosis, and blastomycosis can present with fever, cough, and shortness of breath, thereby resembling COVID-19.

== Prevention ==
Keeping the skin clean and dry, as well as maintaining good hygiene, will help larger topical mycoses. Because some fungal infections are contagious, it is important to wash hands after touching other people or animals. Sports clothing should also be washed after use.

== Treatment ==
Treatment depends on the type of fungal infection, and usually requires topical or systemic antifungal medicines. Pneumocystosis that does not respond to anti-fungals is treated with co-trimoxazole. Sometimes, infected tissue needs to be surgically cut away.

== Epidemiology ==
Worldwide, every year fungal infections affect more than one billion people. An estimated 1.6 million deaths from fungal disease were reported in 2017. The figure has been rising, with an estimated 1.7 million deaths from fungal disease reported in 2020. Fungal infections also constitute a significant cause of illness and mortality in children.

According to the Global Action Fund for Fungal Infections, every year there are over 10 million cases of fungal asthma, around 3 million cases of long-term aspergillosis of lungs, 1 million cases of blindness due to fungal keratitis, more than 200,000 cases of meningitis due to cryptococcus, 700,000 cases of invasive candidiasis, 500,000 cases of pneumocystosis of lungs, 250,000 cases of invasive aspergillosis, and 100,000 cases of histoplasmosis.

== History ==
In 500 BC, an account of ulcers in the mouth by Hippocrates may have described thrush. Paris-based Hungarian microscopist David Gruby first reported that human disease could be caused by fungi in the early 1840s.

=== SARS 2003 ===
During the 2003 SARS outbreak, fungal infections were reported in 14.8–33% of people affected by SARS, and it was the cause of death in 25–73.7% of people with SARS.

== Other animals ==
A wide range of fungal infections occur in other animals, and some can be transmitted from animals to people, such as Microsporum canis from cats.

== See also ==
- Plant diseases § Fungi
- Actinomycosis
- Climate change and infectious diseases
