= Basidiobolomycosis =

Fungal disease

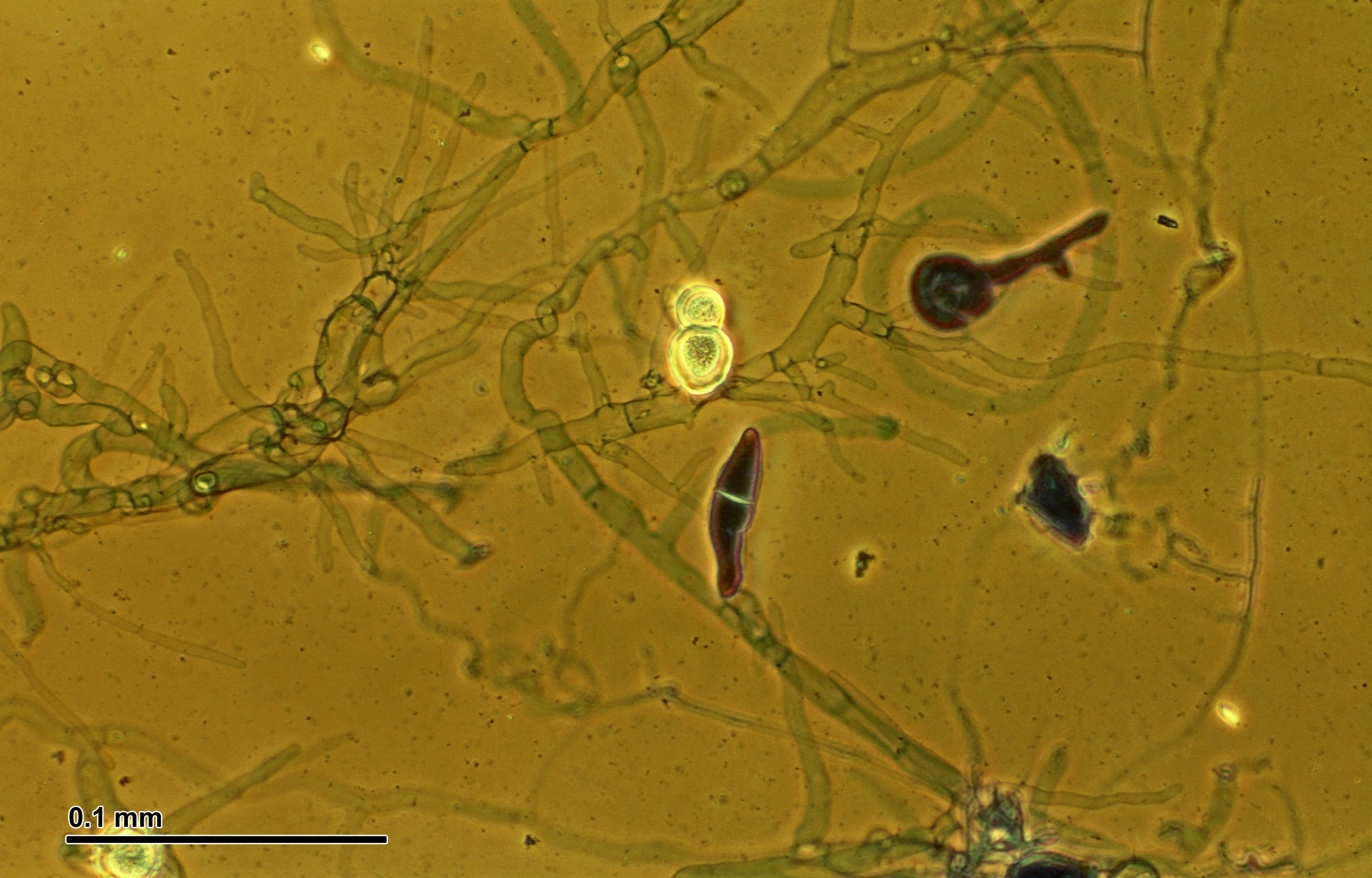
- Basidiobolus ranarum: causative organism
- Specialty: Infectious disease
- Symptoms: Firm painless nodule in skin, tummy upset
- Complications: Spread to local structures
- Usual onset: Gradual/slow
- Causes: B. ranarum
- Diagnostic method: Medical imaging, biopsy, microscopy, culture, histopathology
- Differential diagnosis: Inflammatory bowel disease
- Treatment: Antifungals, surgery
- Medication: Amphotericin B
- Frequency: Rare

Basidiobolomycosis is a fungal disease caused by Basidiobolus ranarum. It may appear as one or more painless firm nodules in the skin which becomes purplish with an edge that appears to be slowly growing outwards. A serious but less common type affects the stomach and intestine, which usually presents with abdominal pain, fever and a mass.

B. ranarum, can be found in soil, decaying vegetables and has been isolated from insects, some reptiles, amphibians, and mammals. The disease results from direct entry of the fungus through broken skin such as an insect bite or trauma, or eating contaminated food. It generally affects people who are well.

Diagnosis is by medical imaging, biopsy, microscopy, culture and histopathology. Treatment usually involves amphotericin B and surgery.

Although B. ranarum is found around the world, the disease Basidiobolomycosis is generally reported in tropical and subtropical areas of Africa, South America, Asia and Southwestern United States. It is rare. The first case in a human was reported from Indonesia in 1956 as a skin infection.

== Signs and symptoms ==
Basidiobolomycosis may appear as a firm nodule in the skin which becomes purplish with an edge that appears to be slowly growing outwards. It is generally painless but may feel itchy or burning. There can be one lesion or several, and usually on the arms or legs of children. Pus may be present if a bacterial infection also occurs. The infection can spread to nearby structures such as muscles, bones and lymph nodes.

A serious but less common type affects the stomach and intestine, which usually presents with tummy ache, fever and a lump. Lymphoedema may occur.

== Mechanism ==
Basidiobolomycosis is a type of Entomophthoromycosis, the other being conidiobolomycosis, and is caused by Basidiobolus ranarum, a fungus belonging to the order Entomophthorales. B. ranarum has been found in soil, decaying vegetables and has been isolated from insects some reptiles, amphibians, and mammals. The disease results from direct entry of the fungus through broken skin such as an insect bite or trauma, or eating contaminated food. Diabetes may be a risk factor. The exact way in which infection results is not completely understood.

== Diagnosis ==
Diagnosis is by culture and biopsy.

A review in 2015 showed that the most common finding on imaging of the abdomen was a mass in the bowel, the liver, or multiple sites and bowel wall thickening. Initially, many were considered to have either a cancer of the bowel or Crohn's disease.

== Treatment ==
Treatment usually involves itraconazole or amphotericin B, combined with surgical debridement. Bowel involvement may be better treated with voriconazole.

== Epidemiology ==
The condition is rare but emerging. Men and children are affected more than females. The disease is generally reported in tropical and subtropical areas of Africa, South America, Asia and several cases in Southwestern United States.

== History ==
The first case in a human was reported from Indonesia as a skin infection in 1956. In 1964, the first case involving stomach and intestine was reported.

== Society and culture ==
Cases among gardeners in Arizona, US, may indicate an occupational hazard, but is unproven.

== Other animals ==
Basidiobolomycosis has been reported in a dog.
