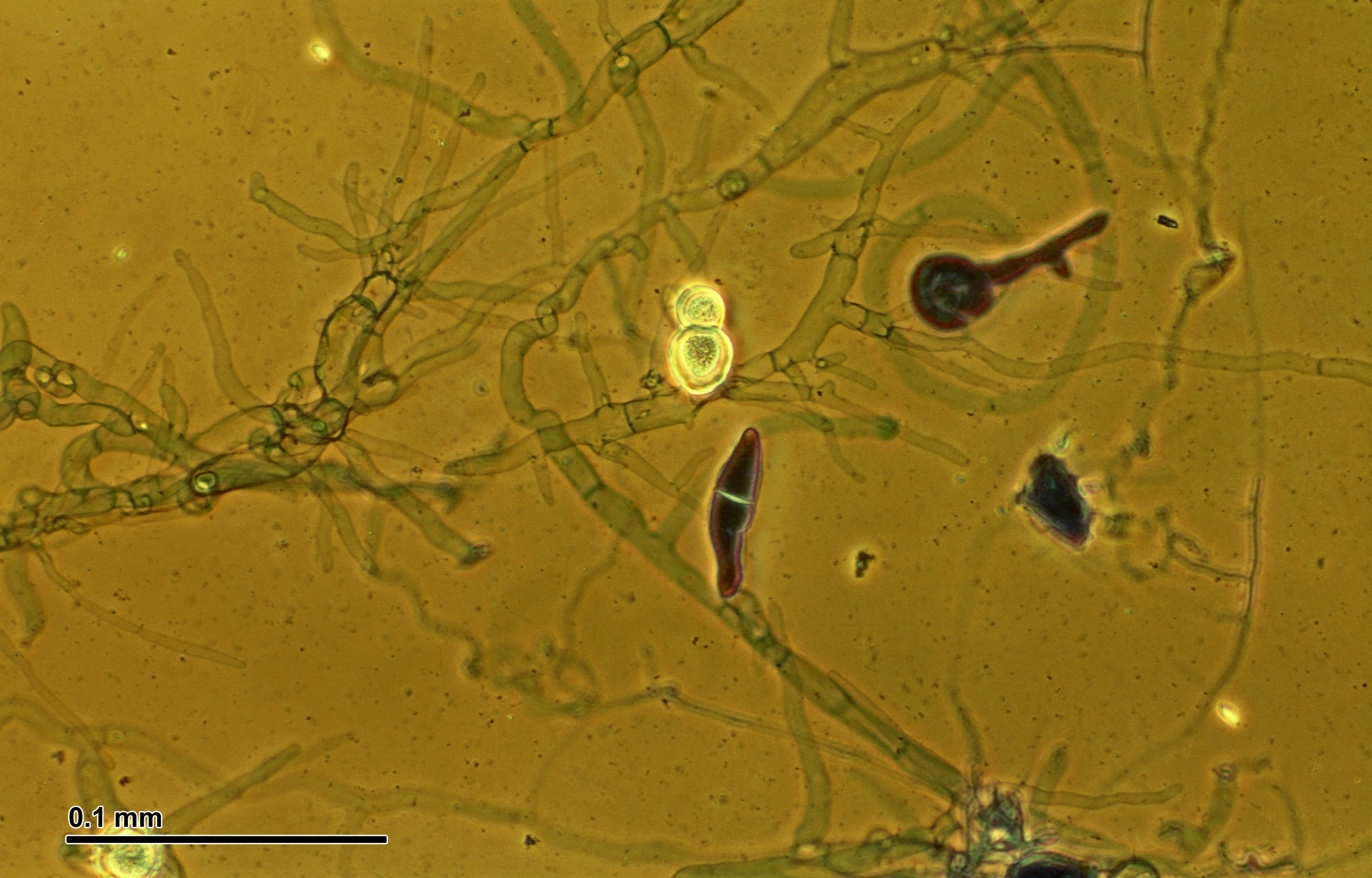
- Basidiobolus ranarum

Scientific classification
- Kingdom: Fungi
- Division: Basidiobolomycota
- Class: Basidiobolomycetes
- Order: Basidiobolales
- Family: Basidiobolaceae
- Genus: Basidiobolus; Eidam

Type species
- Basidiobolus ranarum Eidam

= Basidiobolus =

Genus of fungi

Basidiobolus is a fungus genus. It was circumscribed by the mycologist Eduard Eidam in 1886, with Basidiobolus ranarum assigned as the type species.

== Species ==
- Basidiobolus haptosporus Drechsler
- Basidiobolus heterosporus Sriniv. & Thirum.
- Basidiobolus hominis Casagrandi
- Basidiobolus lacertae Eidam
- Basidiobolus magnus Drechsler
- Basidiobolus meristosporus Drechsler
- Basidiobolus microsporus R.K.Benj.
- Basidiobolus minor (Sriniv. & Thirum.) Al-Hatmi, Sand.-Den. & de Hoog
- Basidiobolus myxophilus R.E. Fr.
- Basidiobolus omanensis Al-Hatmi, Sand.-Den., Balkhair, Al-Adawi & de Hoog
- Basidiobolus philippinensis Josue & Quimio
- Basidiobolus ranarum Eidam
