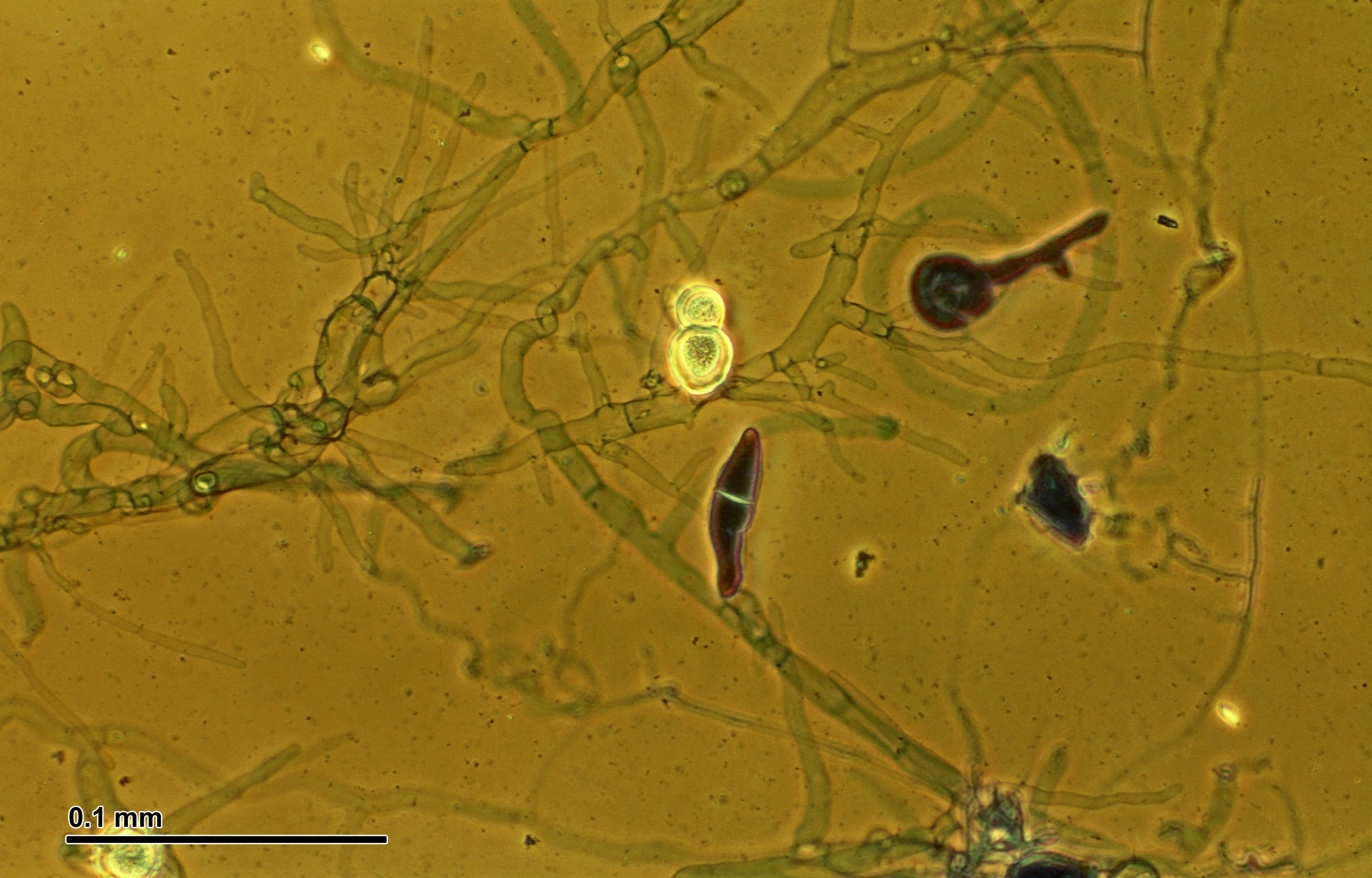
- Positive phase Basidiobolus

Scientific classification
- Kingdom: Fungi
- Clade: Amastigomycota
- Subkingdom: Basidiobolomyceta
- Division: Basidiobolomycota; Doweld 2001
- Subdivision: Basidiobolomycotina; Tedersoo et al. 2018
- Class: Basidiobolomycetes; Doweld 2001
- Order: Basidiobolales; Jacz. & P.A. Jacz. 1931
- Family: Basidiobolaceae; Engl. & E. Gilg 1924

Genera
- Basidiobolus; Drechslerosporium; Schizangiella

= Basidiobolaceae =

Family of fungi

The Basidiobolaceae are a family of fungi in the monotypic order Basidiobolales. All fungal cells of this family are exclusively uninucleate and their relatively large nuclei contain a nucleolus, but no heterochromatin.

They were formerly in the order Entomophthorales. The transfer occurred in 2018.

== Genera ==
- Basidiobolus Eidam 1886 [Amphoromorpha Thaxter 1914]
- Drechslerosporium Huang, Humber & Hodge 2013
- Schizangiella Dwyer et al. 2006
