= List of Podabrus species =

This is a list of 110 species in Podabrus, a genus of soldier beetles in the family Cantharidae.

== Podabrus species ==
- Podabrus alexanderi Fender, 1953^{i g}
- Podabrus alpinus (Paykull, 1798)^{g}
- Podabrus altus Fall, 1928^{i g}
- Podabrus ambiguus Fall, 1928^{i g}
- Podabrus appendiculatus Fall, 1928^{i g b}
- Podabrus basilaris (Say, 1823)^{i g}
- Podabrus basillaris ^{b}
- Podabrus binotatus LeConte, 1881^{i g}
- Podabrus bolteri LeConte, 1881^{i g}
- Podabrus brevicollis Fall, 1928^{i g b}
- Podabrus brevipennis LeConte, 1878^{i g}
- Podabrus brimleyi Green, 1947^{i g b}
- Podabrus brunneus Fender, 1943^{i g}
- Podabrus brunnicollis (Fabricius, 1801)^{i g b}
- Podabrus californicus Fender, 1948^{i g}
- Podabrus carmelensis Fender, 1948^{i g}
- Podabrus cascadensis Fender, 1943^{i g b}
- Podabrus cavicollis LeConte, 1851^{i g b}
- Podabrus cinctipennis LeConte, 1866^{i}
- Podabrus citrinus Fall, 1928^{i g}
- Podabrus confraternus Fall, 1928^{i g}
- Podabrus conspiratus Fall, 1926^{i g b}
- Podabrus corneus LeConte, 1861^{i g}
- Podabrus danielsi Fender, 1943^{i g}
- Podabrus deceptus Brown, 1940^{i}
- Podabrus diadema (Fabricius, 1798)^{i g b}
- Podabrus dietrichi Green, 1947^{i g}
- Podabrus dreisbachi Green, 1948^{i g b}
- Podabrus edmundsae Fender, 1953^{i g b}
- Podabrus excursus Fall, 1928^{i g}
- Podabrus extremus LeConte, 1881^{i}
- Podabrus extricatus Fall, 1928^{i g}
- Podabrus falli Hopping, 1929^{i g b}
- Podabrus fayi LeConte, 1866^{i g b}
- Podabrus fenestratus Fall, 1928^{i g}
- Podabrus fissilis Fall, 1926^{i}
- Podabrus fissus LeConte, 1881^{i g}
- Podabrus flavicollis LeConte, 1851^{i g b}
- Podabrus frater LeConte, 1851^{i g b}
- Podabrus frosti Fender, 1946^{i g}
- Podabrus fulvus Fall, 1928^{i g}
- Podabrus fumiganus Green, 1948^{i}
- Podabrus furtivus Fall, 1928^{i}
- Podabrus gracilis Fall, 1928^{i g}
- Podabrus hackerae Fender in Hatch, 1962^{i}
- Podabrus heteronychus Fall, 1928^{i}
- Podabrus illex Fall, 1928^{i g}
- Podabrus infumatus Green, 1949^{i g}
- Podabrus instabilis Fall, 1928^{i}
- Podabrus intrusus Green, 1947^{i g b}
- Podabrus knobeli Fall, 1928^{i g}
- Podabrus knowltoni Fender, 1948^{i g}
- Podabrus laevicollis (Kirby in Richards, 1837)^{i}
- Podabrus lapponicus (Gyllenhal, 1810)^{g}
- Podabrus lateralis LeConte in Wheeler, 1876^{i g}
- Podabrus latimanus (Motschulsky, 1860)^{i g b}
- Podabrus limatus Fall, 1928^{i g}
- Podabrus limbellus LeConte, 1881^{i}
- Podabrus longicornis Fall, 1928^{i g}
- Podabrus lucidatus Fender, 1948^{i g}
- Podabrus lutosus LeConte, 1881^{i}
- Podabrus lygarius Fender in Hatch, 1962^{i}
- Podabrus macer LeConte, 1861^{i}
- Podabrus malheurensis Fender in Hatch, 1962^{i g}
- Podabrus mellitus LeConte, 1881^{i g}
- Podabrus melvillei Fender in Hatch, 1962^{i}
- Podabrus modestus (Say, 1823)^{i g b}
- Podabrus modulatus Fall, 1928^{i g}
- Podabrus moestus Fall, 1928^{i g}
- Podabrus muliebris Fall, 1928^{i g}
- Podabrus nothoides LeConte, 1881^{i g b}
- Podabrus obscurevittatus Fall, 1928^{i}
- Podabrus obscuripes J.Sahlberg, 1871^{g}
- Podabrus occipitalis Fall, 1928^{i g}
- Podabrus ochocensis Fender, 1953^{i}
- Podabrus pattoni LeConte, 1866^{i}
- Podabrus perplexus Brown, 1940^{i}
- Podabrus piceatus Fender, 1953^{i}
- Podabrus piniphilus (Eschscholtz, 1830)^{i}
- Podabrus planulus Green, 1947^{i g b}
- Podabrus probus Fall, 1928^{i}
- Podabrus protensus LeConte, 1866^{i g b}
- Podabrus pruinosus LeConte, 1851^{i b} (downy leather-winged beetle)
- Podabrus puberulus LeConte in Agassiz, 1850^{i}
- Podabrus punctatus LeConte in Agassiz, 1850^{i}
- Podabrus puncticollis (Kirby in Richards, 1837)^{i}
- Podabrus punctulatus LeConte, 1859^{i g b}
- Podabrus pustulatus Fender in Hatch, 1962^{i}
- Podabrus pygmaeus Green, 1948^{i g b}
- Podabrus quadratus LeConte, 1881^{i g}
- Podabrus rossi Fender, 1948^{i}
- Podabrus rugosulus LeConte in Agassiz, 1850^{i g b}
- Podabrus scaber LeConte, 1861^{i}
- Podabrus schuhi Fender in Hatch, 1962^{i g}
- Podabrus secretus Brown, 1940^{i}
- Podabrus sericatus (Mannerheim, 1846)^{i g}
- Podabrus sierrae Fall, 1928^{i g}
- Podabrus simplex Couper, 1865^{i}
- Podabrus smithi Fender, 1948^{i}
- Podabrus stehri Miskimen, 1956^{i g}
- Podabrus tejonicus LeConte, 1859^{i g}
- Podabrus tenuis Fall, 1928^{i g}
- Podabrus tetragonoderus Fall, 1926^{i b}
- Podabrus tomentosus (Say, 1825)^{i g b}
- Podabrus tricostatus (Say, 1835)^{i g b}
- Podabrus vandykei Fender, 1949^{i g}
- Podabrus vernalis Green, 1948^{i g b}
- Podabrus viduus Fall, 1928^{i g}
- Podabrus xanthoderus LeConte, 1881^{i g}
- Podabrus youngi Fender, 1979^{i g}

Data sources: i = ITIS, c = Catalogue of Life, g = GBIF, b = Bugguide.net
