= List of Cantharidae genera =

These 115 genera belong to the family Cantharidae, soldier beetles. There are at least 1,300 described species in Cantharidae.

== Cantharidae genera ==
- Absidia Mulsant, 1863^{g}
- Absidiella Wittmer, 1972^{i g}
- Afronycha Wittmer, 1949^{g}
- Ancistronycha Märkel, 1852^{i g}
- Armidia Mulsant, 1862^{g}
- Asilis Broun, 1893^{g}
- Asiopodabrus ^{g}
- Asiosilis Wittmer, 1977^{g}
- Atalantycha Kazantsev, 2005^{i g b}
- Athemus Lewis, 1895^{g}
- Bactrocantharis
- Belotus Gorham, 1881^{i g b}
- Bisadia Wittmer, 1972^{g}
- Boveycantharis Wittmer, 1969^{g}
- Caccodes Sharp, 1885^{i c g b}
- Cacomorphocerus Schaufuss, 1891^{g}
- Callosonotatum Pic, 1945^{g}
- Cantharis Linnaeus, 1758^{i b}
- Cantharomorphus Fiori, 1914^{g}
- Chauliognathus Hentz, 1830^{i c g b}
- Compsonycha
- Cordicantharis Svihla, 1999^{g}
- Cordylocera Guérin-Ménéville, 1838^{g}
- Cordylocerellus Wittmer, 1969^{g}
- Cratosilis Motschulsky, 1860^{g}
- Cultellunguis McKey-Fender, 1950^{i g b}
- Curticantharis Zhang, 1989^{g}
- Cyrtomoptera Motschulsky, 1860^{i g b}
- Daiphron Gorham, 1881^{g}
- Dichelotarsus Motschoulsky, 1859^{g b}
- Discodon Gorham, 1881^{i g b}
- Ditemnus LeConte, 1861^{g b}
- Electronycha Kazantsev, 2013^{g}
- Electrosilis Kazantsev, 2013^{g}
- Falsomalthinus Pic, 1924^{g}
- Falsomalthodes Pic, 1924^{g}
- Falsopodabrus Pic, 1927^{g}
- Fissocantharis ^{g}
- Frostia Fender, 1951^{i g b}
- Geigyella Wittmer, 1972^{i g}
- Guineapolemius Wittmer, 1969^{g}
- Habronychus (Monohabronychus)^{g}
- Hatchiana Fender, 1966^{i g}
- Hemipodistra Ganglbauer, 1922^{i g}
- Heteromastix Boheman, 1858^{g}
- Hoffeinsensia Kuska & Kania, 2010^{g}
- Ichthyurus Westwood, 1848^{i g}
- Islamocantharis Wittmer & Magis, 1978^{g}
- Kandyosilis Pic, 1929^{g}
- Laemoglyptus Fairmaire, 1886^{g}
- Lobetus Kiesenwetter, 1852^{g}
- Lycocerus Gorham^{g}
- Macrocerus Motschulsky, 1845^{g}
- Macromalthinus Pic, 1919^{g}
- Macrosilis Pic, 1911^{g}
- Malthesis Motschulsky, 1853^{g}
- Malthinellus Kiesenwetter, 1874^{g}
- Malthinus Latreille, 1806^{i g b}
- Malthodes Kiesenwetter, 1852^{i g b}
- Malthoichthyurus Pic, 1919^{g}
- Malthomethes
- Maltypus Motschulsky, 1859^{g}
- Markus Fanti & Pankowski, 2018^{g}
- Maronius Gorham, 1881^{g}
- Metacantharis Bourgeois, 1886^{g}
- Microdaiphron Pic, 1926^{g}
- Microichthyurus Pic, 1919^{g}
- Micropodabrus Pic, 1920^{g}
- Mimoplatycis Kazantsev, 2013^{g}
- Mimopolemius Pic, 1921^{g}
- Neogressittia Wittmer, 1969^{g}
- Neoontelus Wittmer, 1972^{g}
- Occathemus Svihla, 1999^{g}
- Oontelus Solier, 1849^{g}
- Pacificanthia Kazantsev, 2001^{i g b}
- Pakabsidia Wittmer, 1972^{g}
- Paracantharis Wittmer, 1969^{g}
- Paradiscodon Wittmer, 1969^{g}
- Paramaronius Wittmer, 1963^{g}
- Peltariosilis Wittmer, 1952^{g}
- Phytononus
- Plectonotum Gorham, 1891^{i g b}
- Podabrinus
- Podabrus Westwood, 1838^{i g b}
- Podistra Motschulsky, 1839^{g}
- Podosilis Wittmer, 1978^{g}
- Polemiosilis Pic, 1921^{g}
- Polemius LeConte, 1851^{i g b}
- Porostenus Motschulsky, 1853^{g}
- Prosthaptus
- Prothemus Champion, 1926^{g}
- Pseudoabsidia Wittmer, 1969^{i g}
- Pseudopachymesia Pic, 1911^{g}
- Pseudosilis Pic, 1911^{g}
- Pygodiscodon Wittmer, 1952^{g}
- Rambesilis Pic, 1911^{g}
- Rhagonycha Eschscholtz, 1830^{i g b}
- Rhaxonycha Motschulsky, 1860^{i g b}
- Silidiscodon Leng & Mutchler, 1922^{g}
- Silis Charpentier, 1825^{i g b}
- Sinometa Wittmer, 1969^{g}
- Sogdocantharis
- Sphaerarthrum Waterhouse, 1884^{g}
- Stenothemus Bourgeois, 1907^{g}
- Sucinocantharis Kuska & Kania, 2010^{g}
- Sucinorhagonycha Kuska, 1996^{g}
- Symphyomethes
- Taiwanocantharis ^{g}
- Telephorus
- Themus (Themus)^{g}
- Troglomethes
- Trypherus LeConte, 1851^{i g b}
- Tylocerus Dalman, 1833^{g}
- Tytthonyx LeConte, 1851^{i g b}
- Walteriella Kazantsev, 2001^{g}

Data sources: i = ITIS, c = Catalogue of Life, g = GBIF, b = Bugguide.net
