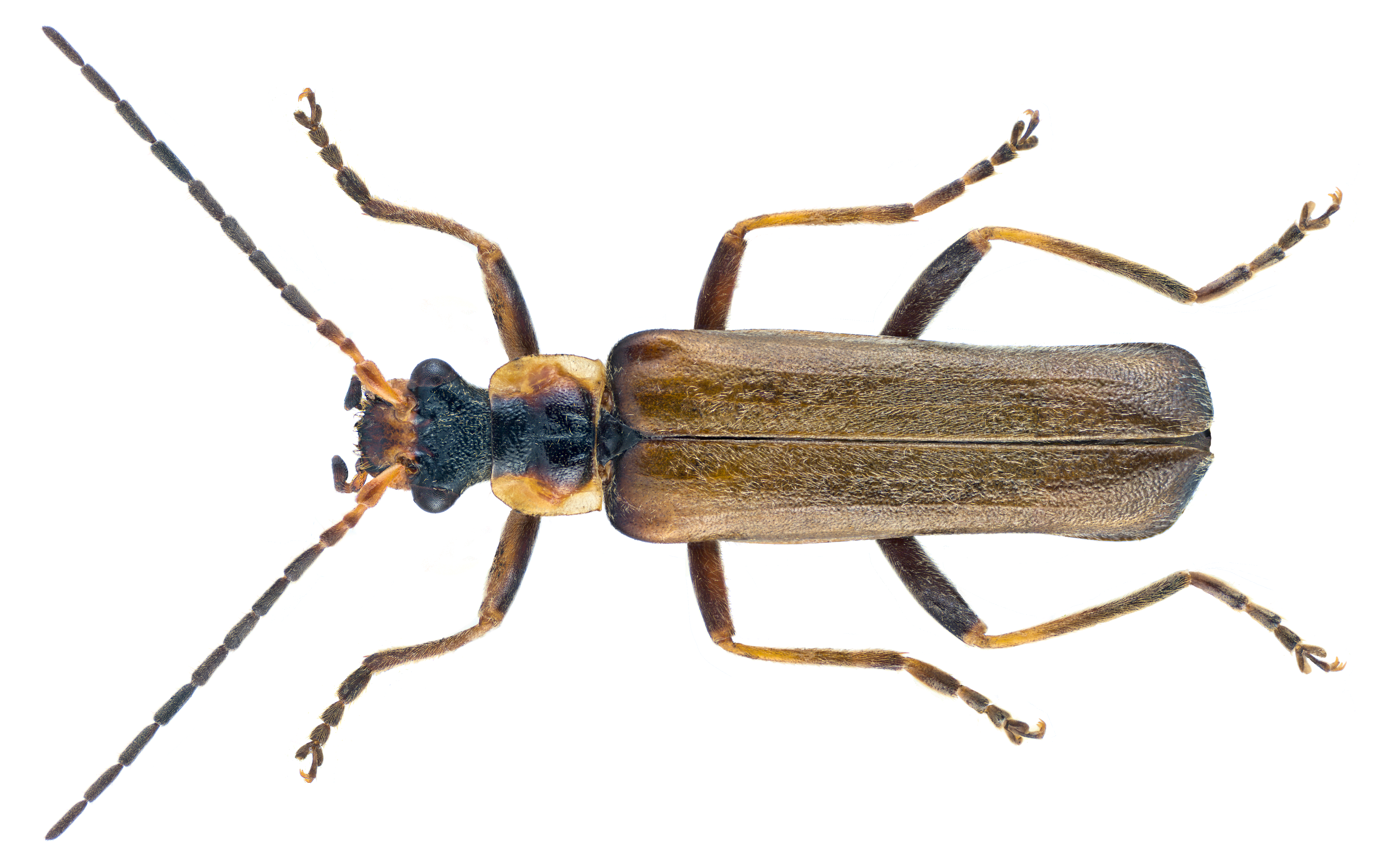

Scientific classification
- Kingdom: Animalia
- Phylum: Arthropoda
- Clade: Pancrustacea
- Class: Insecta
- Order: Coleoptera
- Suborder: Polyphaga
- Infraorder: Elateriformia
- Family: Cantharidae
- Subfamily: Cantharinae
- Tribe: Podabrini
- Genus: Podabrus
- Species: P. alpinus

Binomial name
- Podabrus alpinus (Paykull, 1798)

= Podabrus alpinus =

Species of beetle

Podabrus alpinus is a species of soldier beetles native to Europe.

== Description ==
Adults have a body length of 11 to 15 mm (0.43 to 0.59 in). Appearance varies greatly. Elytra can range from shiny black to dark brownish-gold and legs are often black or dark brown-orange with black tarsi. Typically, the pronotum has a black stripe running lengthwise with orange or pale yellow sides. It has also been found that some specimens of P. alpinus have no black marking on the pronotum. Although the appearance of the pronotum is variable, the head is consistently black from in between the compound eyes to the front of the pronotum. The antennae are mostly black with a few orange segments closer to the head.

== Range ==
P. alpinus can be found throughout Europe—excluding the Iberian Peninsula and most of the Balkans—and are most common in the Alps.

== History ==
P. alpinus was first described in 1798 by Swedish entomologist Gustaf von Paykull in his species publication Monographia Staphylinorum Sueciae.
