= Frostia laticollis =

Scientific classification
- Domain: Eukaryota
- Kingdom: Animalia
- Phylum: Arthropoda
- Class: Insecta
- Order: Coleoptera
- Suborder: Polyphaga
- Infraorder: Elateriformia
- Family: Cantharidae
- Genus: Frostia
- Species: F. laticollis

Binomial name
- Frostia laticollis (LeConte, 1866)

Species of beetle

Frostia laticollis is a species of soldier beetle in the family Cantharidae. It is found in North America.
