= Cyrtomoptera divisa =

Scientific classification
- Kingdom: Animalia
- Phylum: Arthropoda
- Class: Insecta
- Order: Coleoptera
- Suborder: Polyphaga
- Infraorder: Elateriformia
- Family: Cantharidae
- Genus: Cyrtomoptera
- Species: C. divisa

Binomial name
- Cyrtomoptera divisa (LeConte, 1851)

Species of beetle

Cyrtomoptera divisa is a species of soldier beetle in the family Cantharidae. It is found in North America.
