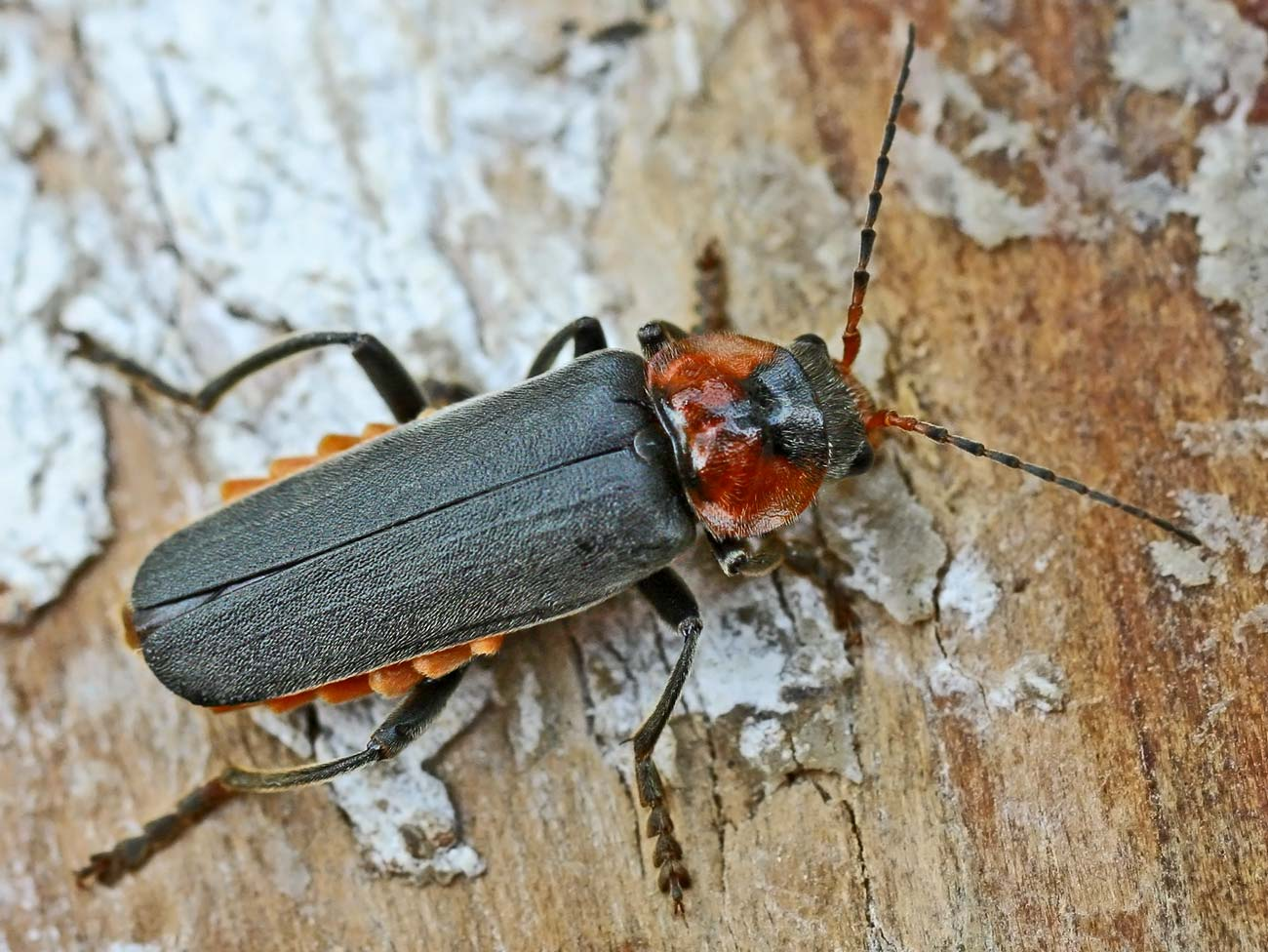
- Cantharis fusca (type genus and species)

Scientific classification
- Domain: Eukaryota
- Kingdom: Animalia
- Phylum: Arthropoda
- Class: Insecta
- Order: Coleoptera
- Suborder: Polyphaga
- Infraorder: Elateriformia
- Family: Cantharidae
- Subfamily: Cantharinae; Imhoff, 1856

= Cantharinae =

Cantharinae Temporal range: Albian–Recent

Subfamily of beetles

Cantharinae is a subfamily of beetles in the family Cantharidae. There are at least 200 described species in Cantharinae.

Taxonomic note

- Lawrence and Newton (1995) give the authorship of this subfamily as Imhoff, 1856 (1815).

== Tribes and genera ==
Two tribes are accepted:

=== Cantharini ===
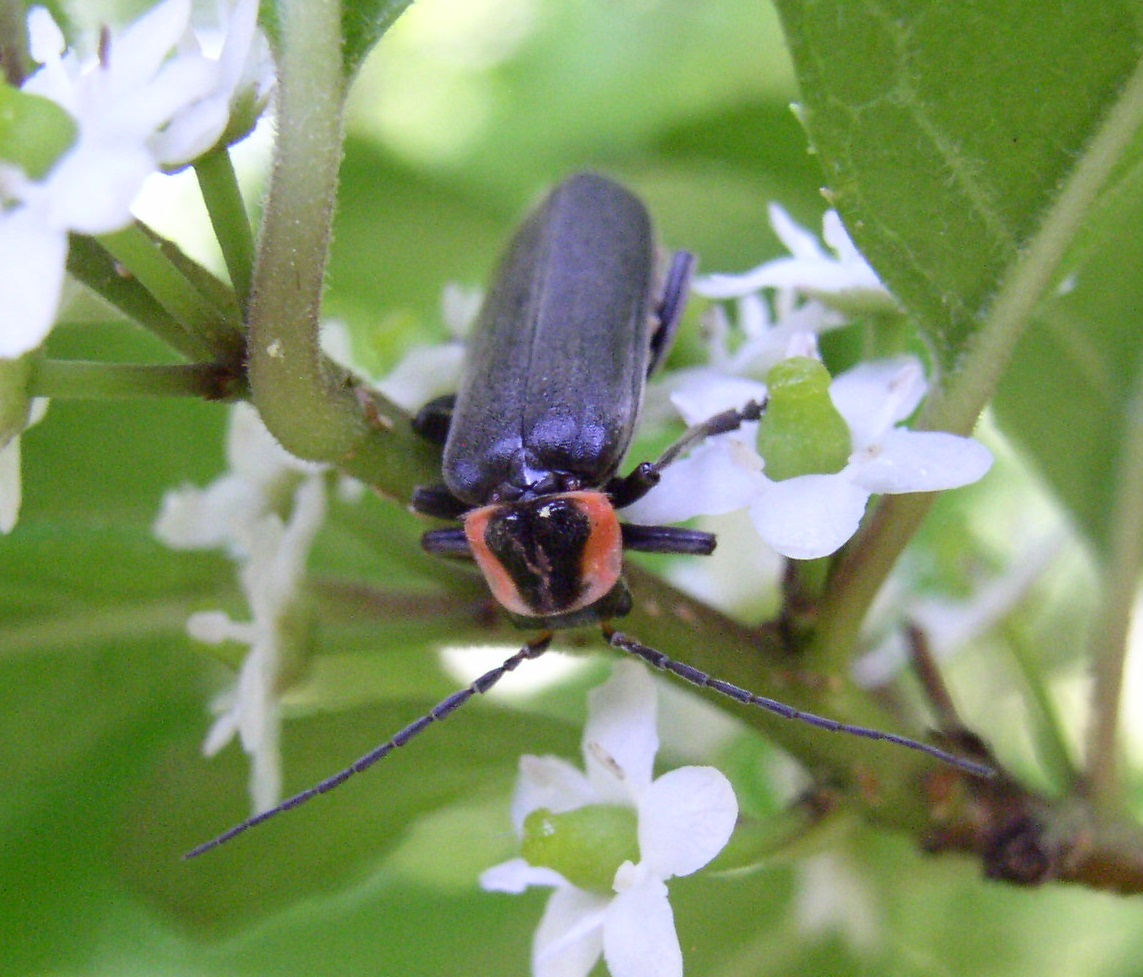
Rhaxonycha carolina

- Absidiella Wittmer, 1972
- Ancistronycha Märkel, 1852
- Atalantycha Kazantsev, 2005
- Cantharis Linnaeus, 1758
- Cultellunguis McKey-Fender, 1950
- Cyrtomoptera Motschulsky, 1860
- Hemipodistra Ganglbauer, 1922
- Pacificanthia Kazantsev, 2001
- Pseudoabsidia Wittmer, 1969
- Rhagonycha Eschscholtz, 1830
- Rhaxonycha Motschulsky, 1860
- †Burmomiles Fanti et al. 2018 Burmese amber, Myanmar, Cenomanian
- †Elektrokleinia Ellenberger & Fanti, 2019 Burmese amber Myanmar, Cenomanian
- †Myamalycocerus Fanti and Ellenberger 2016 Burmese amber, Myanmar, Cenomanian
- †Molliberus Peris and Fanti 2018 Spanish amber, Albian
- †Ornatomalthinus Poinar and Fanti 2016 Burmese amber, Myanmar, Cenomanian (Subsequently suggested to belong to Silinae)
- †Sanaungulus Fanti et al. 2018 Burmese amber, Myanmar, Cenomanian

=== Podabrini ===
Auth.: Gistel, 1856

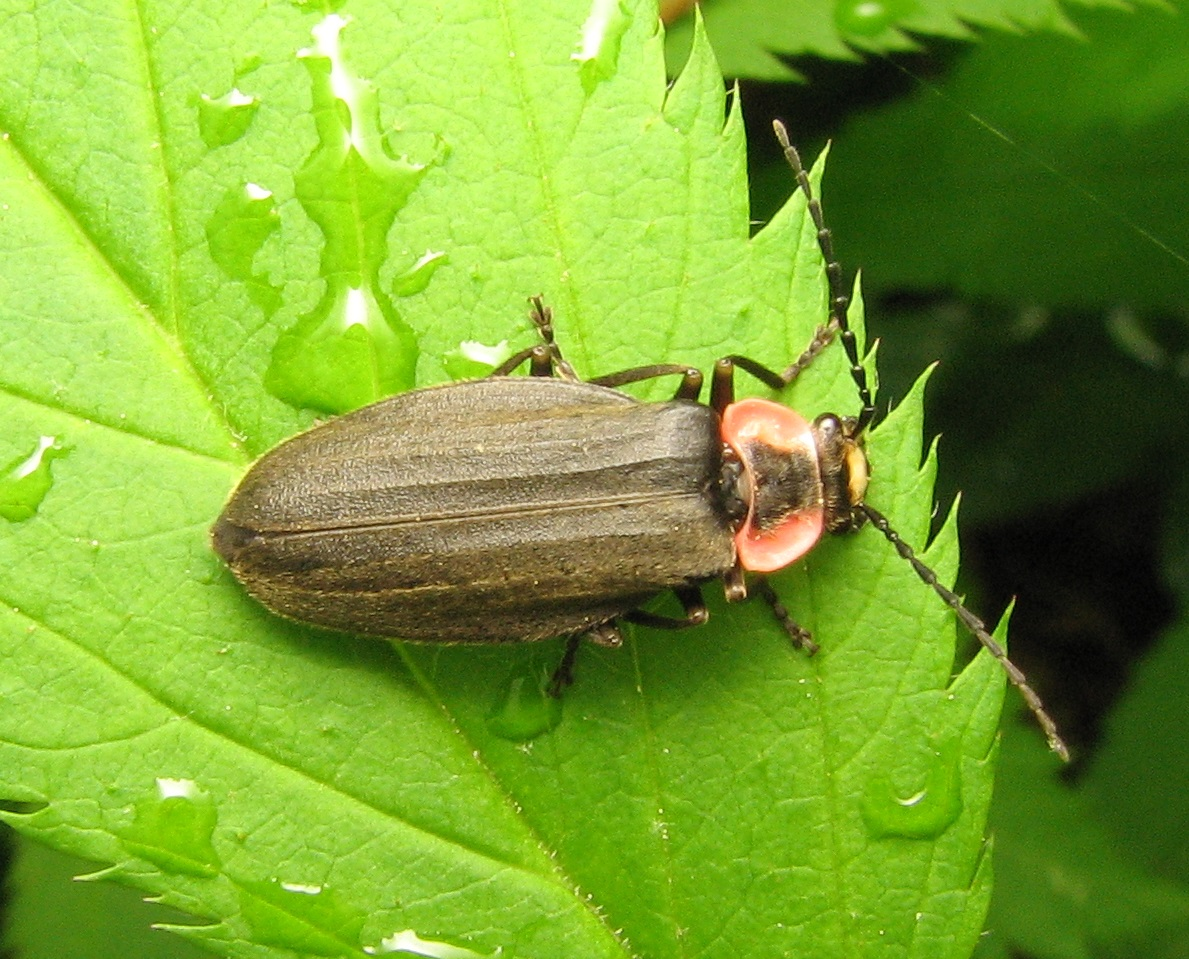
Podabrus tricostatus

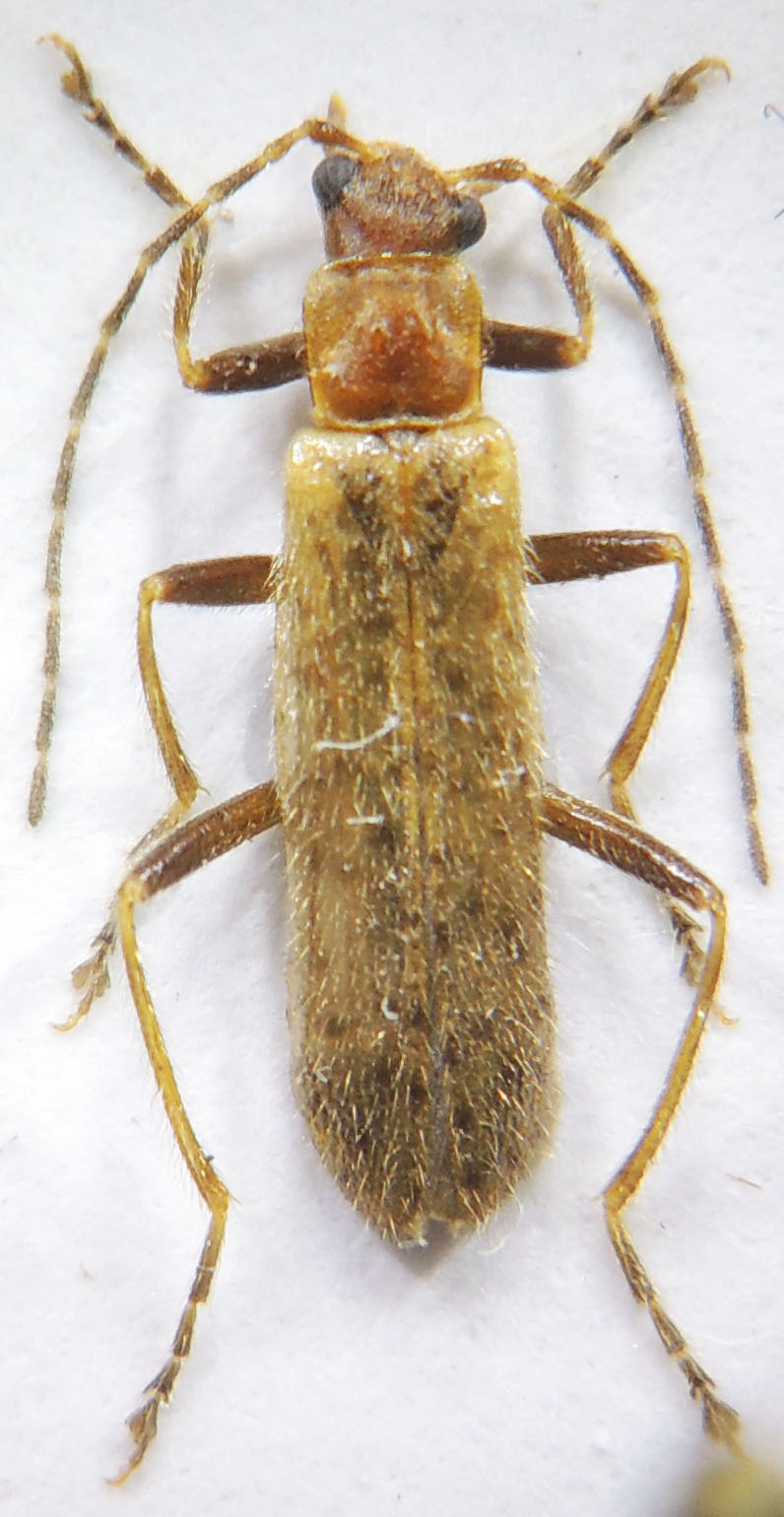
Stenothemus cou (possibly a synonym of Falsopodabrus)

- Asiopodabrus Wittmer, 1982
- Cephalomalthinus Pic, 1921
- Dichelotarsus Motschulsky, 1859
- Falsopodabrus Pic, 1927
- Fissopodabrus Pic, 1927
- Hatchiana Fender, 1966
- Kandyosilis Pic, 1929
- Micropodabrus Pic, 1920
- Podabrus Westwood, 1838
- Stenopodabrus Nakane, 1992

=== †Cacomorphocerini ===
Auth: Fanti and Kupryjanowicz 2018, all known members originate from the Eocene aged Baltic amber

- †Cacomorphocerus Schaufuss 1891
- †Eridanula Fanti and Damgaard 2018
- †Noergaardia Fanti and Damgaard 2018
- †Sucinocantharis Kuśka and Kania 2010
- †Sucinorhagonycha Kuska 1996

=== Incertae sedis ===
†Katyacantharis Kazantsev and Perkovsky 2019, Agdzhakend amber, Azerbaijan, Cenomanian
