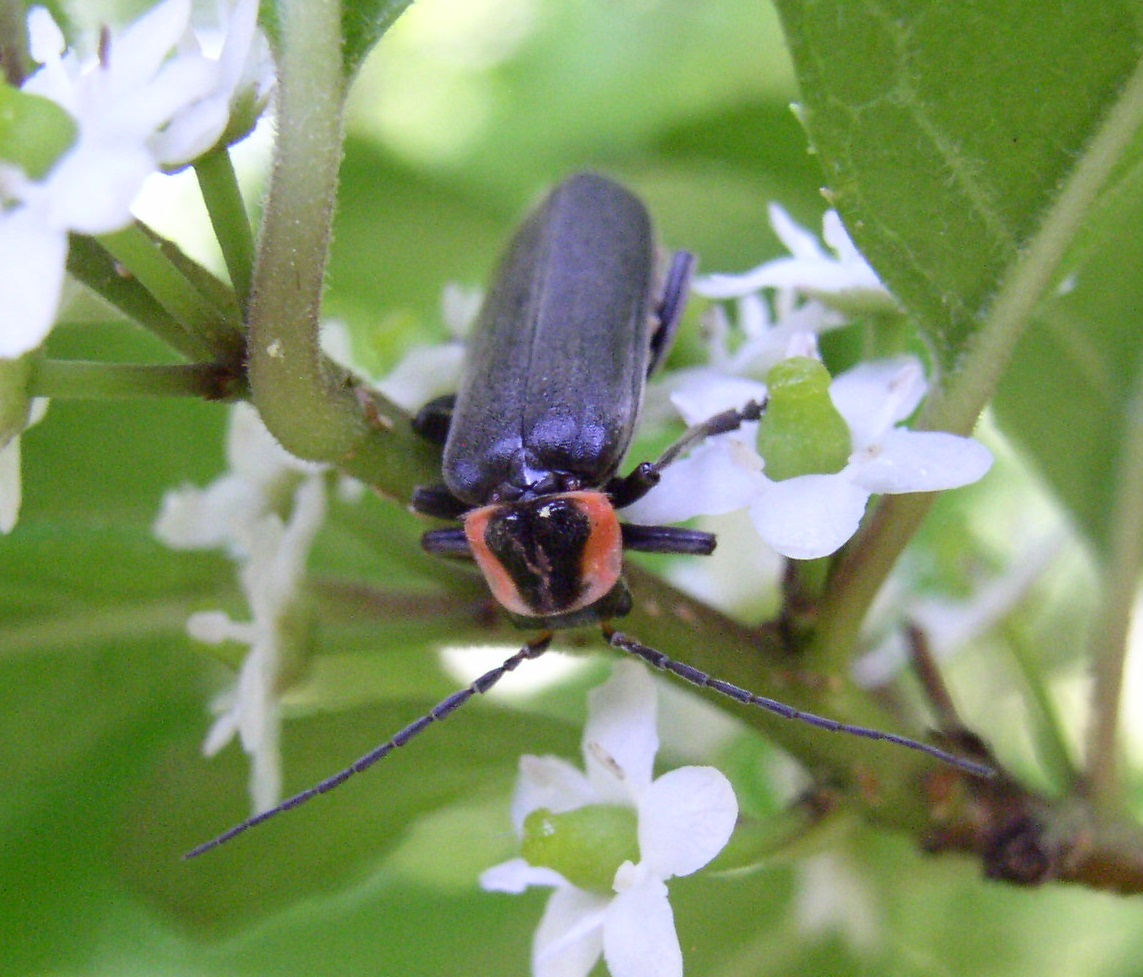
- Rhaxonycha carolina

Scientific classification
- Kingdom: Animalia
- Phylum: Arthropoda
- Clade: Pancrustacea
- Class: Insecta
- Order: Coleoptera
- Suborder: Polyphaga
- Infraorder: Elateriformia
- Family: Cantharidae
- Subfamily: Cantharinae
- Tribe: Cantharini; Imhoff, 1856

Synonyms
- Telephorides Leach, 1815

= Cantharini =

Tribe of beetles

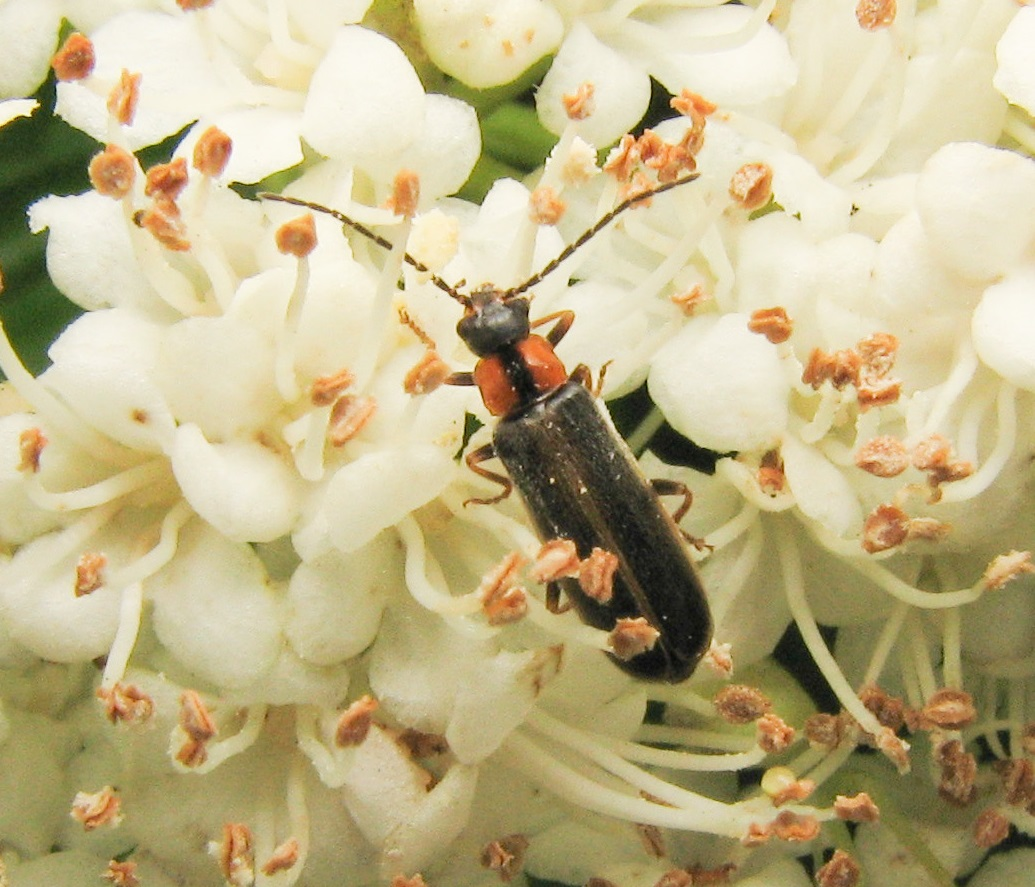
Rhagonycha recta

Cantharini is a tribe of soldier beetles in the family Cantharidae. There are more than 40 genera and over 500 described species in Cantharini.

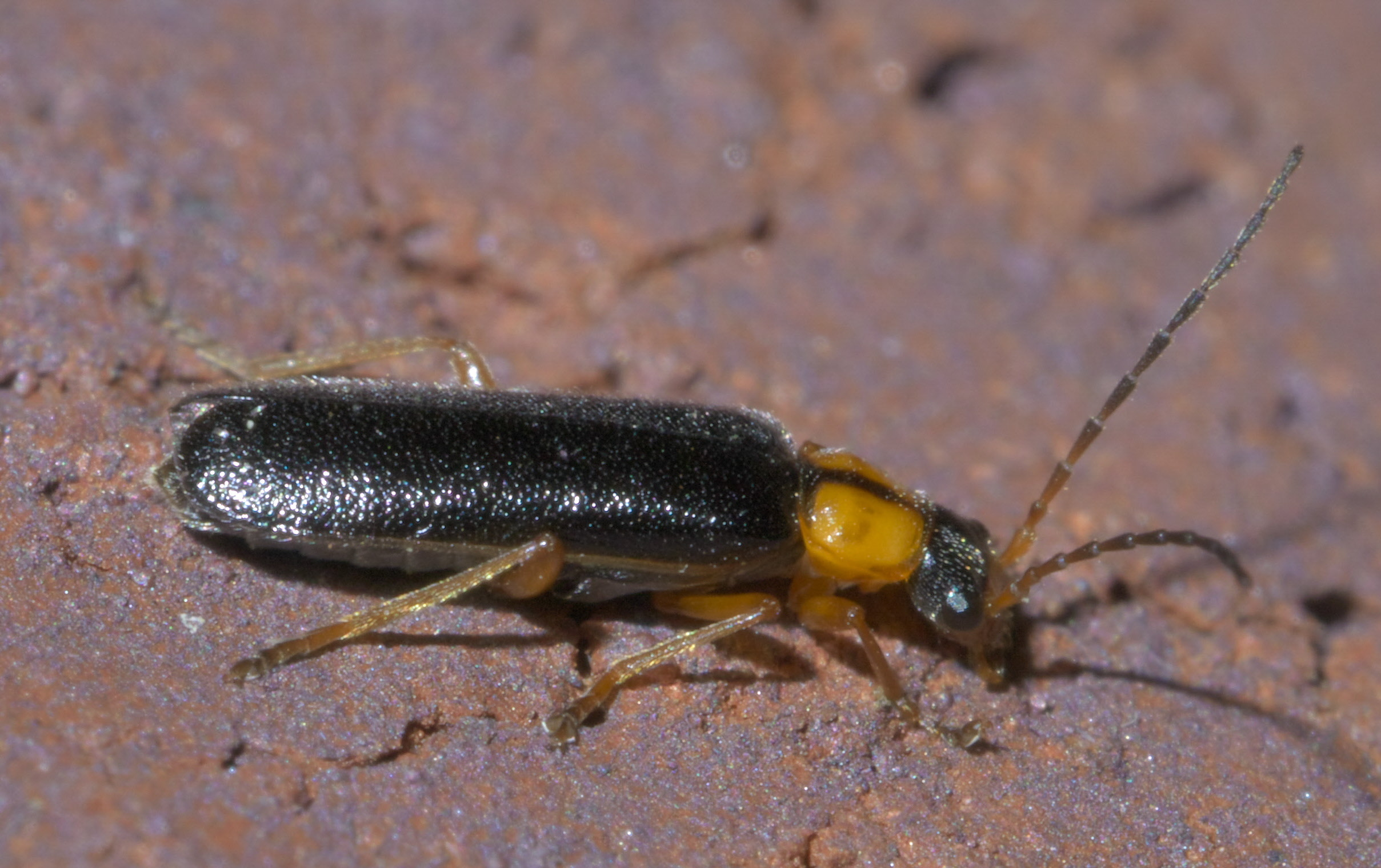
Rhagonycha

== Genera ==
These 46 genera belong to the tribe Cantharini:

- Ancistronycha Märkel, 1852
- Armidia Mulsant, 1862
- Atalantycha Kazantsev, 2005
- Bactrocantharis Barovskii, 1926
- Bactronycha Kazantsev, 2001
- Bisadia Wittmer, 1972
- Boveycantharis Wittmer, 1969
- Cantharis Linnaeus, 1758
- Cantharomorphus Fiori, 1914
- Cephalomalthinus Pic, 1921
- Cordicantharis Svihla, 1999
- Cratosilis Motschulsky, 1860
- Cultellunguis McKey-Fender, 1950
- Cyrebion Fairmaire, 1891
- Cyrtomoptera Motschulsky, 1860
- Falsopodabrus Pic, 1927
- Habronychus Wittmer, 1982
- Islamocantharis Wittmer & Magis, 1978
- Leiothorax Wittmer, 1978
- Lycocerus Gorham, 1889
- Malchinomorphus Pic, 1922
- Metacantharis Bourgeois, 1886
- Micropodabrus Pic, 1920
- Mimopodabrus Wittmer, 1997
- Occathemus Svihla, 1999
- Pacificanthia Kazantsev, 2001
- Pakabsidia Wittmer, 1972
- Paracantharis Wittmer, 1969
- Podabrinus Fairmaire, 1896
- Podistra Motschulsky, 1839
- Prothemellus Svihla, 1992
- Prothemus Champion, 1926
- Pseudopodabrus Pic, 1906
- Rambesilis Pic, 1911
- Rhagonycha Eschscholtz, 1830
- Rhaxonycha Motschulsky, 1860
- Sidabia Svihla, 1994
- Silicantharis Svihla, 1992
- Sinometa Wittmer, 1969
- Sogdocantharis Kasantsev, 1993
- Stenothemus Bourgeois, 1907
- Taiwanocantharis Wittmer, 1984
- Taocantharis Švihla, 2011
- Themus Motschulsky, 1858
- Walteriella Kazantsev, 2001
- Yukikoa Sato, 1976
