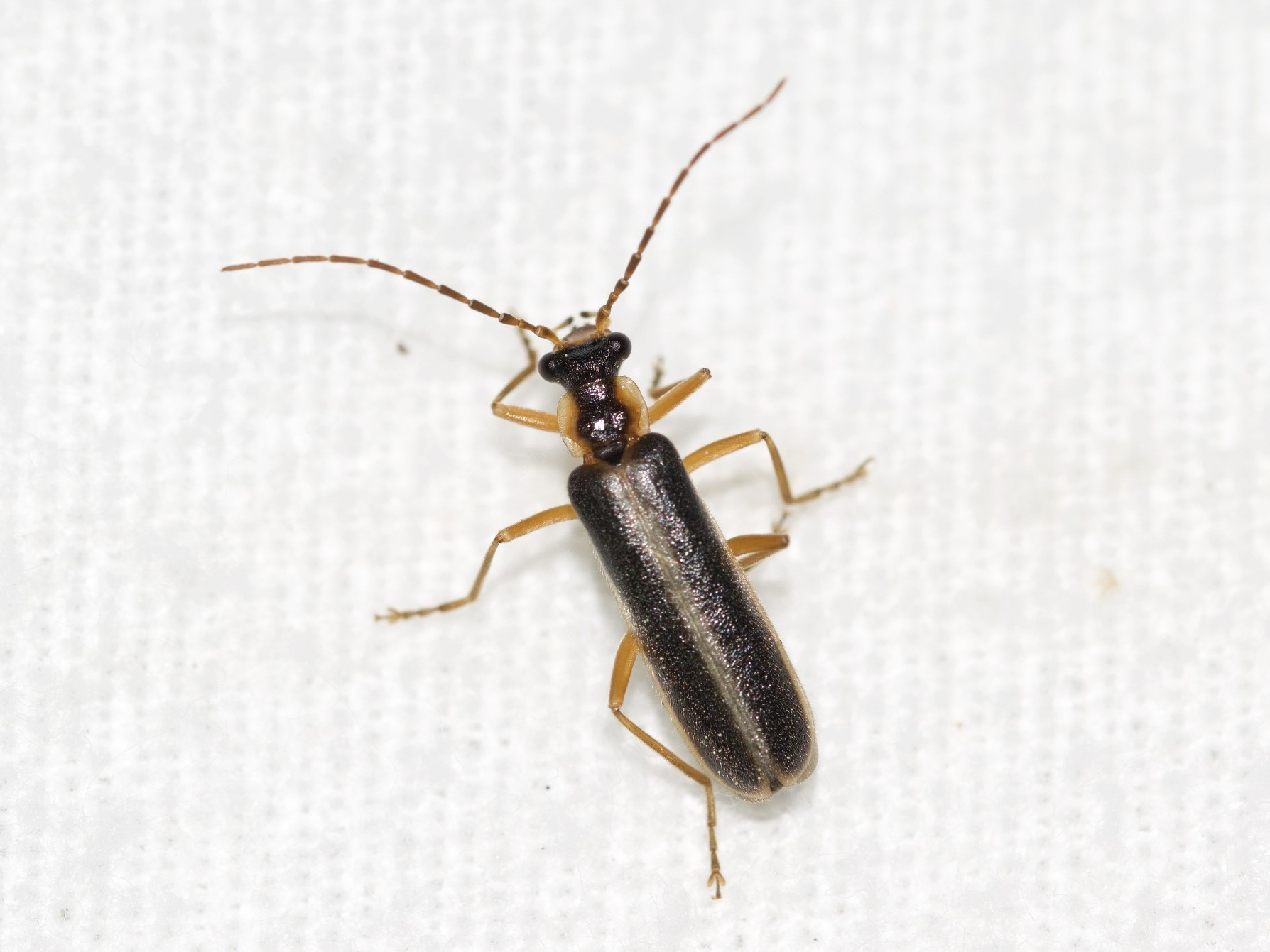

Scientific classification
- Domain: Eukaryota
- Kingdom: Animalia
- Phylum: Arthropoda
- Class: Insecta
- Order: Coleoptera
- Suborder: Polyphaga
- Infraorder: Elateriformia
- Family: Cantharidae
- Genus: Podabrus
- Species: P. modestus

Binomial name
- Podabrus modestus (Say, 1823)

= Podabrus modestus =

Species of beetle

Podabrus modestus is a species of soldier beetle in the family Cantharidae. It is found in eastern North America (Canada and the United States).

Podabrus modestus measure 8.5–11 mm (0.3–0.4 in).
