= Podabrus edmundsae =

Scientific classification
- Kingdom: Animalia
- Phylum: Arthropoda
- Class: Insecta
- Order: Coleoptera
- Suborder: Polyphaga
- Infraorder: Elateriformia
- Family: Cantharidae
- Genus: Podabrus
- Species: P. edmundsae

Binomial name
- Podabrus edmundsae Fender, 1953

Species of beetle

Podabrus edmundsae is a species of soldier beetle in the family Cantharidae. It is found in North America.
