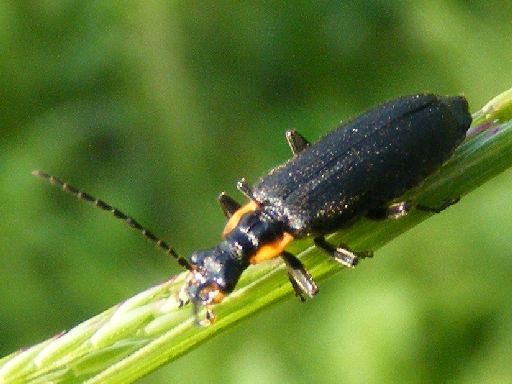

Scientific classification
- Kingdom: Animalia
- Phylum: Arthropoda
- Clade: Pancrustacea
- Class: Insecta
- Order: Coleoptera
- Suborder: Polyphaga
- Infraorder: Elateriformia
- Family: Cantharidae
- Genus: Podabrus
- Species: P. diadema

Binomial name
- Podabrus diadema (Fabricius, 1798)

= Podabrus diadema =

Species of beetle

Podabrus diadema is a species of soldier beetle in the family Cantharidae. It is found in North America.

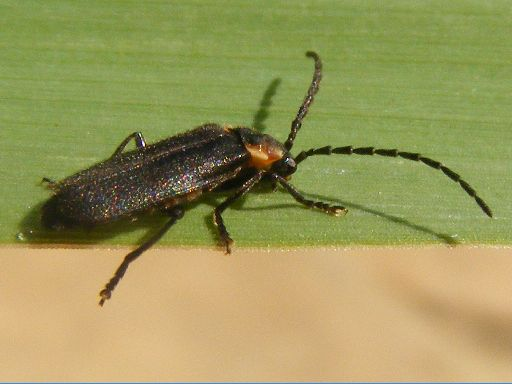
