= Podabrus cascadensis =

Scientific classification
- Kingdom: Animalia
- Phylum: Arthropoda
- Class: Insecta
- Order: Coleoptera
- Suborder: Polyphaga
- Infraorder: Elateriformia
- Family: Cantharidae
- Genus: Podabrus
- Species: P. cascadensis

Binomial name
- Podabrus cascadensis Fender, 1943

Species of beetle

Podabrus cascadensis is a species of soldier beetle in the family Cantharidae. It is found in North America.
