= Podabrus alexanderi =

Scientific classification
- Kingdom: Animalia
- Phylum: Arthropoda
- Class: Insecta
- Order: Coleoptera
- Suborder: Polyphaga
- Infraorder: Elateriformia
- Family: Cantharidae
- Genus: Podabrus
- Species: P. alexanderi

Binomial name
- Podabrus alexanderi Fender, 1953

Species of beetle

Podabrus alexanderi is a species of soldier beetle in the family Cantharidae. It is found in North America.

== Description ==
Adults have a body length of 8.5 to 9 mm (0.33 to 0.35 in). Elytra is black with a rugose-punctate texture and the coxae and femora are a pale orange. The front angles of the orange pronotum are slanted inward while the sides are parallel. In males, the tarsal claws are cleft.

== History ==
P. alexanderi was first described in 1953 by Kenneth M. Fender using specimens collected by Dr. Charles Paul Alexander in his 1949 expedition in Banff National Park, Alberta, Canada. One specimen is currently in housing in the California Academy of Sciences collection.
