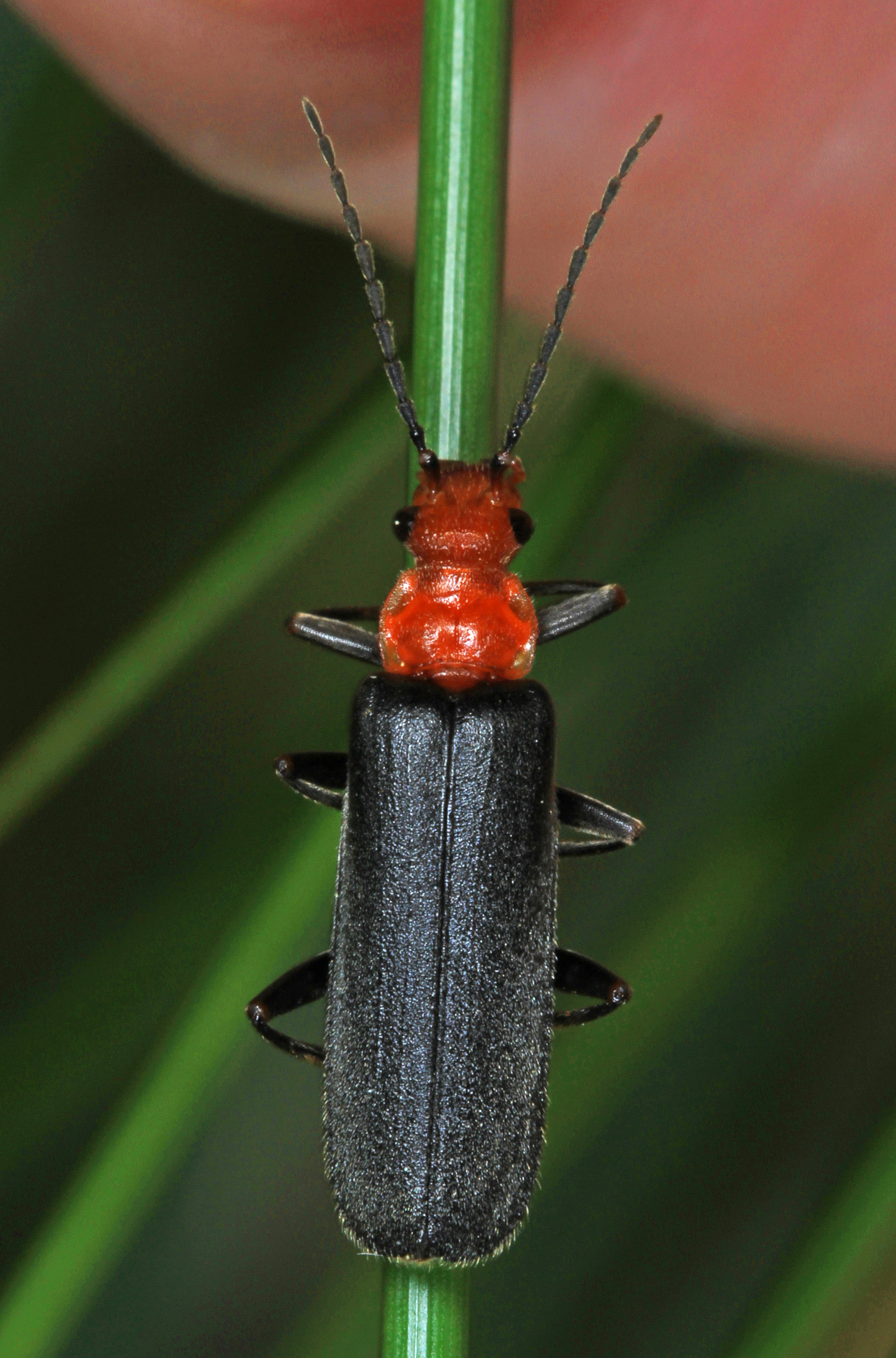

Scientific classification
- Domain: Eukaryota
- Kingdom: Animalia
- Phylum: Arthropoda
- Class: Insecta
- Order: Coleoptera
- Suborder: Polyphaga
- Infraorder: Elateriformia
- Family: Cantharidae
- Genus: Podabrus
- Species: P. pruinosus

Binomial name
- Podabrus pruinosus LeConte, 1851

= Podabrus pruinosus =

Species of beetle

Podabrus pruinosus, the downy leather-winged beetle, is a species of soldier beetle in the family Cantharidae. It is found in North America.

== Description and behavior ==
Adults have a body length of 9-15 mm. They are orange with wing covers that are black-brown and covered in fine hair. They are common in spring and summer, when they feed on aphids. If disturbed, they will fall to the ground.

Larvae are 15-20 mm long, pink, with two dark lines on the thorax. They live in soil.

== Subspecies ==
These five subspecies belong to the species Podabrus pruinosus:

- Podabrus pruinosus atrocervicus Fender, 1962
- Podabrus pruinosus comes
- Podabrus pruinosus diversipes Fall, 1927
- Podabrus pruinosus gradatus
- Podabrus pruinosus pruinosus
