= Podabrus planulus =

Scientific classification
- Domain: Eukaryota
- Kingdom: Animalia
- Phylum: Arthropoda
- Class: Insecta
- Order: Coleoptera
- Suborder: Polyphaga
- Infraorder: Elateriformia
- Family: Cantharidae
- Genus: Podabrus
- Species: P. planulus

Binomial name
- Podabrus planulus Green, 1947

Species of beetle

Podabrus planulus is a species of soldier beetle in the family Cantharidae. It is found in North America.
