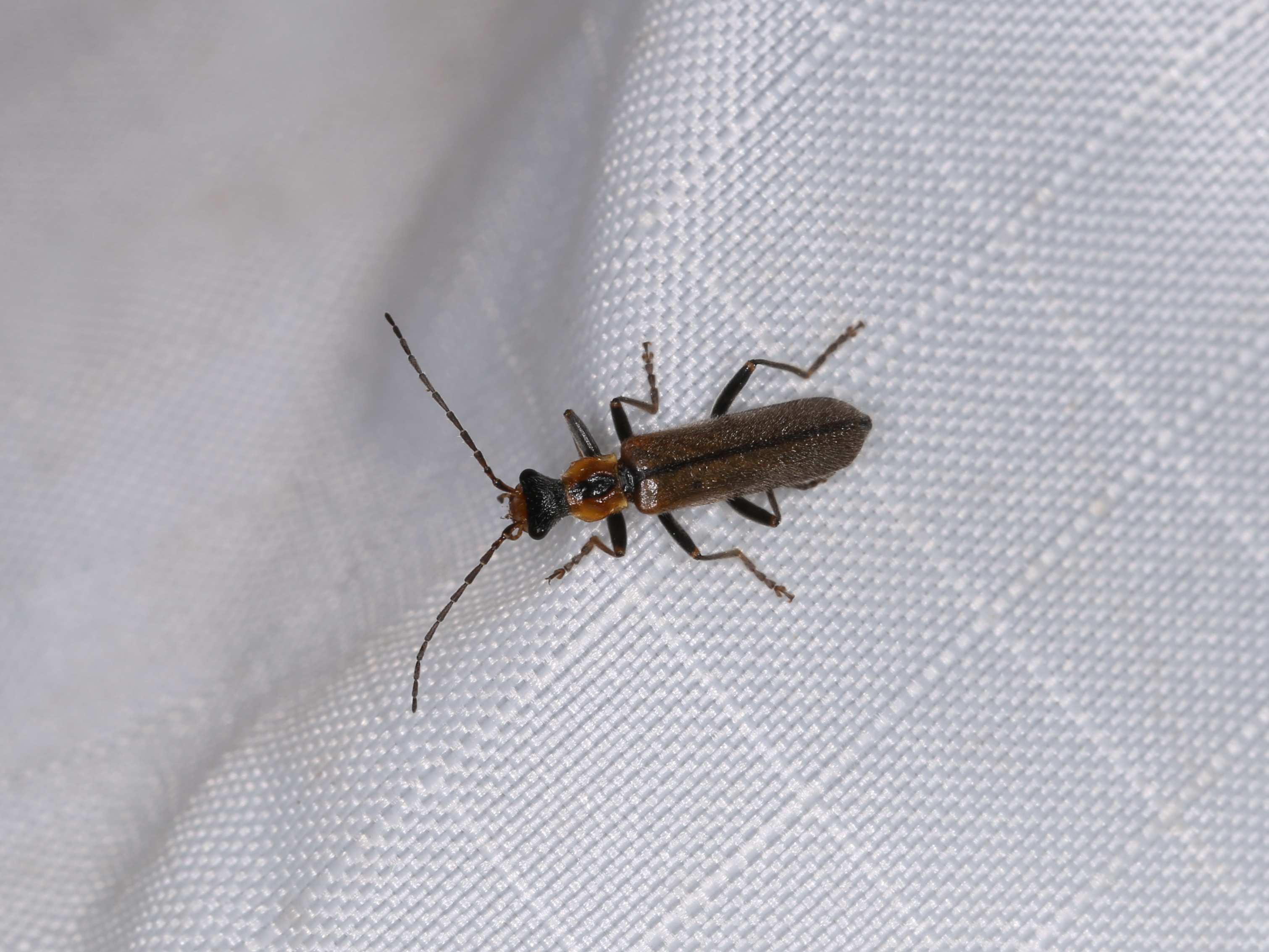

Scientific classification
- Domain: Eukaryota
- Kingdom: Animalia
- Phylum: Arthropoda
- Class: Insecta
- Order: Coleoptera
- Suborder: Polyphaga
- Infraorder: Elateriformia
- Family: Cantharidae
- Genus: Podabrus
- Species: P. cavicollis

Binomial name
- Podabrus cavicollis LeConte, 1851

= Podabrus cavicollis =

Species of beetle

Podabrus cavicollis is a species of soldier beetle in the family Cantharidae. It is found in North America.

== Subspecies ==
These two subspecies belong to the species Podabrus cavicollis:

- Podabrus cavicollis cavicollis
- Podabrus cavicollis hatchi
