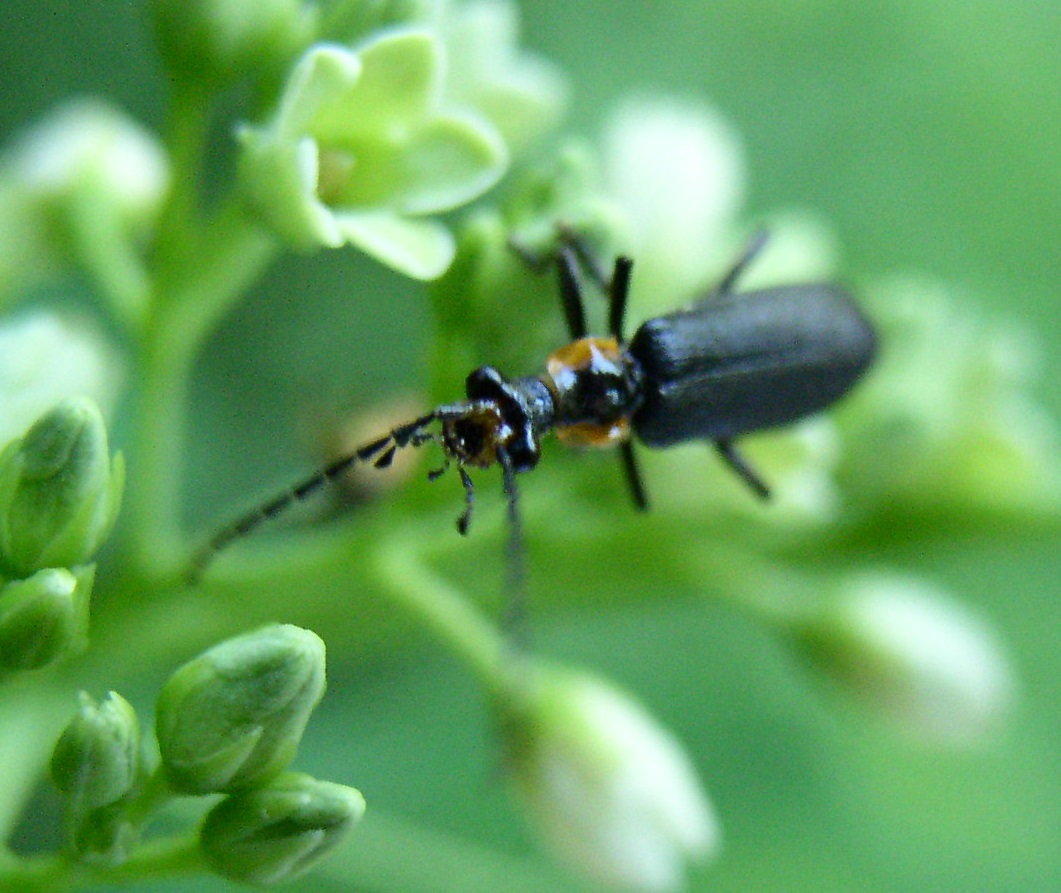

Scientific classification
- Domain: Eukaryota
- Kingdom: Animalia
- Phylum: Arthropoda
- Class: Insecta
- Order: Coleoptera
- Suborder: Polyphaga
- Infraorder: Elateriformia
- Family: Cantharidae
- Genus: Podabrus
- Species: P. frater

Binomial name
- Podabrus frater LeConte, 1851

= Podabrus frater =

Species of beetle

Podabrus frater is a species of soldier beetle in the family Cantharidae. It is found in North America.
