= Fissocantharis =

Scientific classification
- Kingdom: Animalia
- Phylum: Arthropoda
- Clade: Pancrustacea
- Class: Insecta
- Order: Coleoptera
- Suborder: Polyphaga
- Infraorder: Elateriformia
- Family: Cantharidae
- Genus: Fissocantharis; Pic, 1921

Type species
- Fissocantharis opaca Pic, 1921

Diversity
- About 200+ species

Synonyms
- Pseudouroctonus

Genus of beetles

Fissocantharis is a genus of soldier beetle belonging to the family Cantharidae. It is one of the largest genera of cantharid beetles, with about 200 species known worldwide and new species discovered in every year.

In China, more than 100 species recognized. About 30 species identified from Taiwan, where all of them are endemic, except one species, F. mucronata.

== Selected species ==
- Fissocantharis acuticollis
- Fissocantharis angusta
- Fissocantharis basilaris
- Fissocantharis bicolorata
- Fissocantharis bidifformis
- Fissocantharis bifoveatus
- Fissocantharis bimaculata
- Fissocantharis biprojicientis
- Fissocantharis buonloiensis
- Fissocantharis cicatricosa
- Fissocantharis denominata
- Fissocantharis eschara
- Fissocantharis fissa
- Fissocantharis flava
- Fissocantharis flavicornis
- Fissocantharis flavimembris
- Fissocantharis flavipennis
- Fissocantharis gracilipes
- Fissocantharis grahami
- Fissocantharis guizhouensis
- Fissocantharis hainana
- Fissocantharis imparicornis
- Fissocantharis kontumensis
- Fissocantharis laticollis
- Fissocantharis laticornis
- Fissocantharis latipalpa
- Fissocantharis liuchowensis
- Fissocantharis maculiceps
- Fissocantharis maculicollis
- Fissocantharis multiexcavata
- Fissocantharis nigriceps
- Fissocantharis novemexcavatus
- Fissocantharis novemoblonga
- Fissocantharis pallidiceps
- Fissocantharis paulioincrassata
- Fissocantharis pieli
- Fissocantharis safranekimima
- Fissocantharis securiclata
- Fissocantharis semifumata
- Fissocantharis semimetallica
- Fissocantharis septangula
- Fissocantharis sexcostata
- Fissocantharis similis
- Fissocantharis sinensis
- Fissocantharis sinensomima
- Fissocantharis tachulanensis
- Fissocantharis tridifformis
- Fissocantharis walteri
- Fissocanthais yui
