= Podabrus punctulatus =

Scientific classification
- Domain: Eukaryota
- Kingdom: Animalia
- Phylum: Arthropoda
- Class: Insecta
- Order: Coleoptera
- Suborder: Polyphaga
- Infraorder: Elateriformia
- Family: Cantharidae
- Genus: Podabrus
- Species: P. punctulatus

Binomial name
- Podabrus punctulatus LeConte, 1859

Species of beetle

Podabrus punctulatus is a species of soldier beetle in the family Cantharidae. It is found in North America.
