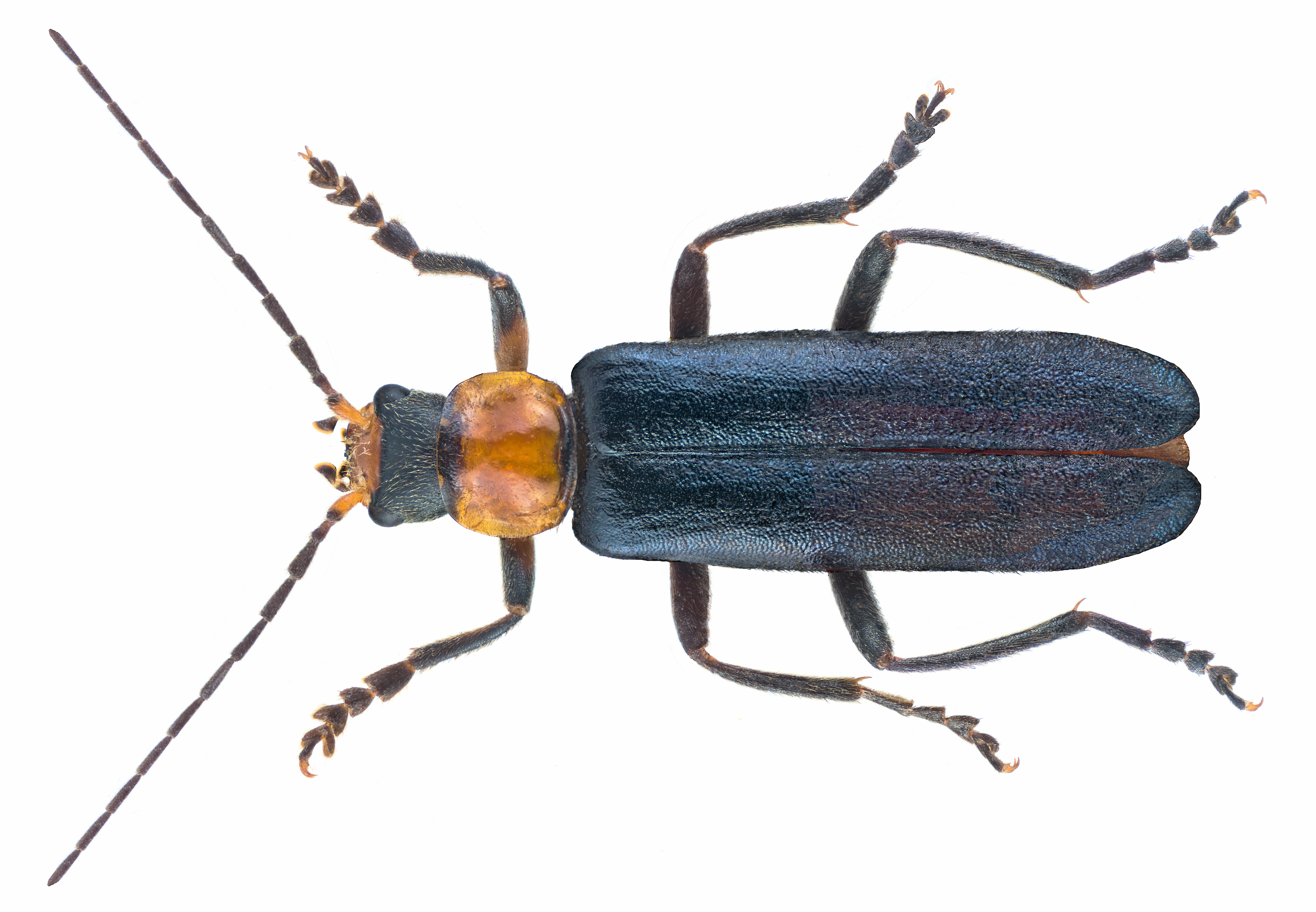
- Ancistronycha abdominalis, Blue Soldier Beetle

Scientific classification
- Domain: Eukaryota
- Kingdom: Animalia
- Phylum: Arthropoda
- Class: Insecta
- Order: Coleoptera
- Suborder: Polyphaga
- Infraorder: Elateriformia
- Family: Cantharidae
- Subfamily: Cantharinae
- Tribe: Cantharini
- Genus: Ancistronycha; Märkel, 1852

= Ancistronycha =

Genus of beetles

Ancistronycha is a genus of soldier beetles in the family Cantharidae. There are about eight described species in Ancistronycha, found in Europe and Northern Asia (excluding China).

== Species ==
These eight species belong to the genus Ancistronycha:

- Ancistronycha abdominalis (Fabricius, 1798) (Blue Soldier Beetle)
- Ancistronycha antaliensis Kazantsev, 2010
- Ancistronycha astur Heyden, 1880
- Ancistronycha erichsonii Bach, 1854
- Ancistronycha lucens Moscardini, 1967
- Ancistronycha occipitalis (Rosenhauer, 1847)
- Ancistronycha taygetana Pic, 1902
- Ancistronycha tigurina Dietrich, 1857
