= Frostia (beetle) =

Scientific classification
- Kingdom: Animalia
- Phylum: Arthropoda
- Class: Insecta
- Order: Coleoptera
- Suborder: Polyphaga
- Infraorder: Elateriformia
- Family: Cantharidae
- Subfamily: Malthininae
- Tribe: Malthodini
- Genus: Frostia; Fender, 1951

Genus of beetles

Frostia is a genus of soldier beetles in the family Cantharidae. There are about five described species in Frostia.

== Species ==
These five species belong to the genus Frostia:

- Frostia bidentata Fender, 1951^{i g}
- Frostia impressa Fender, 1951^{i g}
- Frostia laticollis (LeConte, 1866)^{i g b}
- Frostia malkini Fender, 1951^{i g}
- Frostia reflexa (Fall, 1919)^{i g}

Data sources: i = ITIS, c = Catalogue of Life, g = GBIF, b = Bugguide.net
