= Macrocerus =

Scientific classification
- Kingdom: Animalia
- Phylum: Arthropoda
- Class: Insecta
- Order: Coleoptera
- Suborder: Polyphaga
- Infraorder: Elateriformia
- Superfamily: Elateroidea
- Family: Cantharidae
- Subfamily: Malthininae
- Genus: Macrocerus; Motschulsky, 1845

Synonyms
- Malchinus Kiesenwetter, 1863

Genus of beetles

External image
- Images at iNaturalist

Macrocerus is a European genus of soldier beetles in the subfamily Malthininae and sometimes placed in the monotypic tribe Malchinini.

== Species ==
BioLib lists the following species:

- Macrocerus carinicollis (Weise, 1895)
- Macrocerus holomelas (Fairmaire, 1886)
- Macrocerus kadleci (Svihla, 2002)
- Macrocerus nigrinus (Schaufuss, 1866)
- Macrocerus oculatus (Motschulsky, 1845)
- Macrocerus sinuatocollis (Kiesenwetter, 1852)
- †Macrocerus sucinopenninus (Kuśka & Kania, 2010) (Rupelian age)
- Macrocerus tunicatus (Kiesenwetter, 1863)
