= Cordylocera =

Scientific classification
- Kingdom: Animalia
- Phylum: Arthropoda
- Class: Insecta
- Order: Coleoptera
- Suborder: Polyphaga
- Infraorder: Elateriformia
- Family: Cantharidae
- Genus: Cordylocera; Guérin-Ménéville, 1830

Species
- See text

Synonyms
- Anisotelus Hope, 1831; Xanthestha Dejean, 1833

Genus of beetles

Cordylocera is a genus of soldier beetles (insects in the family Cantharidae).

The following species are assigned to this genus:

- Cordylocera antennata Guérin-Méneville, 1830
- Cordylocera atricornis Guérin-Méneville, 1838
- Cordylocera atroapicalis (Pic, 1917)
- Cordylocera bimaculata (Hope, 1831)
- Cordylocera bispilota (Hope, 1831)
- Cordylocera borneensis (Pic, 1910)
- Cordylocera flavonotata (Pic, 1925)
- Cordylocera fumipennis (Gorham, 1895)
- Cordylocera hispida (Champion, 1926)
- Cordylocera interrupta (Wittmer, 1953)
- Cordylocera leechi (Wittmer, 1953)
- Cordylocera livida (Hope, 1831)
- Cordylocera manducata (Gorham, 1889)
- Cordylocera metallescens (Bourgeois, 1909)
- Cordylocera mindanaonis (Pic, 1924)
- Cordylocera nigripennis (Gorham, 1895)
- Cordylocera pectoralis (Fabricius, 1801)
- Cordylocera setuligera (Pic, 1911)
- Cordylocera subaenescens (Bourgeois, 1909)
