= Plectonotum =

Scientific classification
- Kingdom: Animalia
- Phylum: Arthropoda
- Clade: Pancrustacea
- Class: Insecta
- Order: Coleoptera
- Suborder: Polyphaga
- Infraorder: Elateriformia
- Family: Cantharidae
- Subfamily: Silinae
- Genus: Plectonotum; Gorham, 1891

Genus of beetles

Plectonotum is a genus of soldier beetles in the family Cantharidae. There is at least one described species in Plectonotum, P. excisum.
