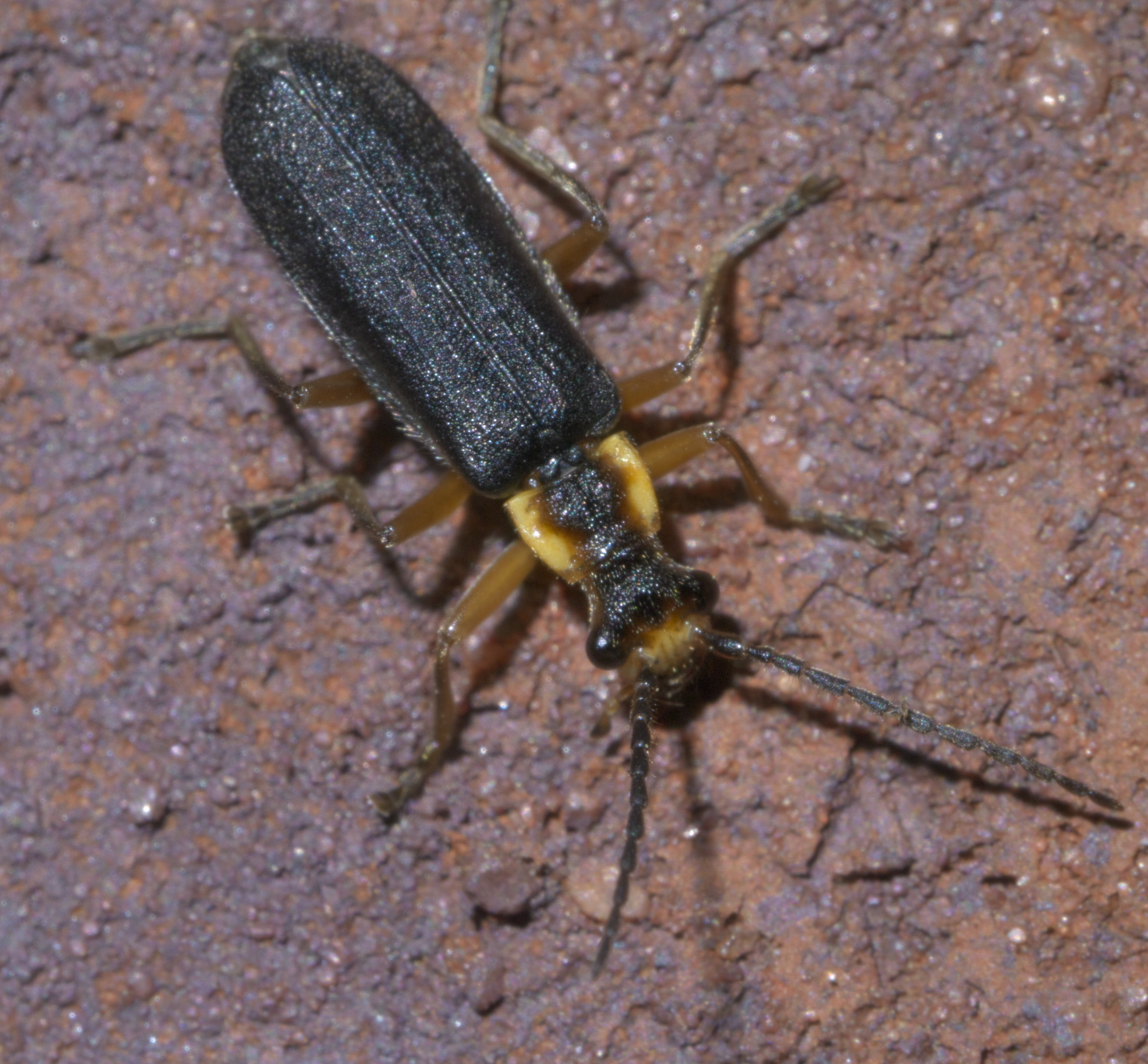

Scientific classification
- Kingdom: Animalia
- Phylum: Arthropoda
- Class: Insecta
- Order: Coleoptera
- Suborder: Polyphaga
- Infraorder: Elateriformia
- Family: Cantharidae
- Genus: Podabrus
- Species: P. rugosulus

Binomial name
- Podabrus rugosulus LeConte in Agassiz, 1850

= Podabrus rugosulus =

Species of beetle

Podabrus rugosulus is a species of soldier beetle in the family Cantharidae. It is found in North America.

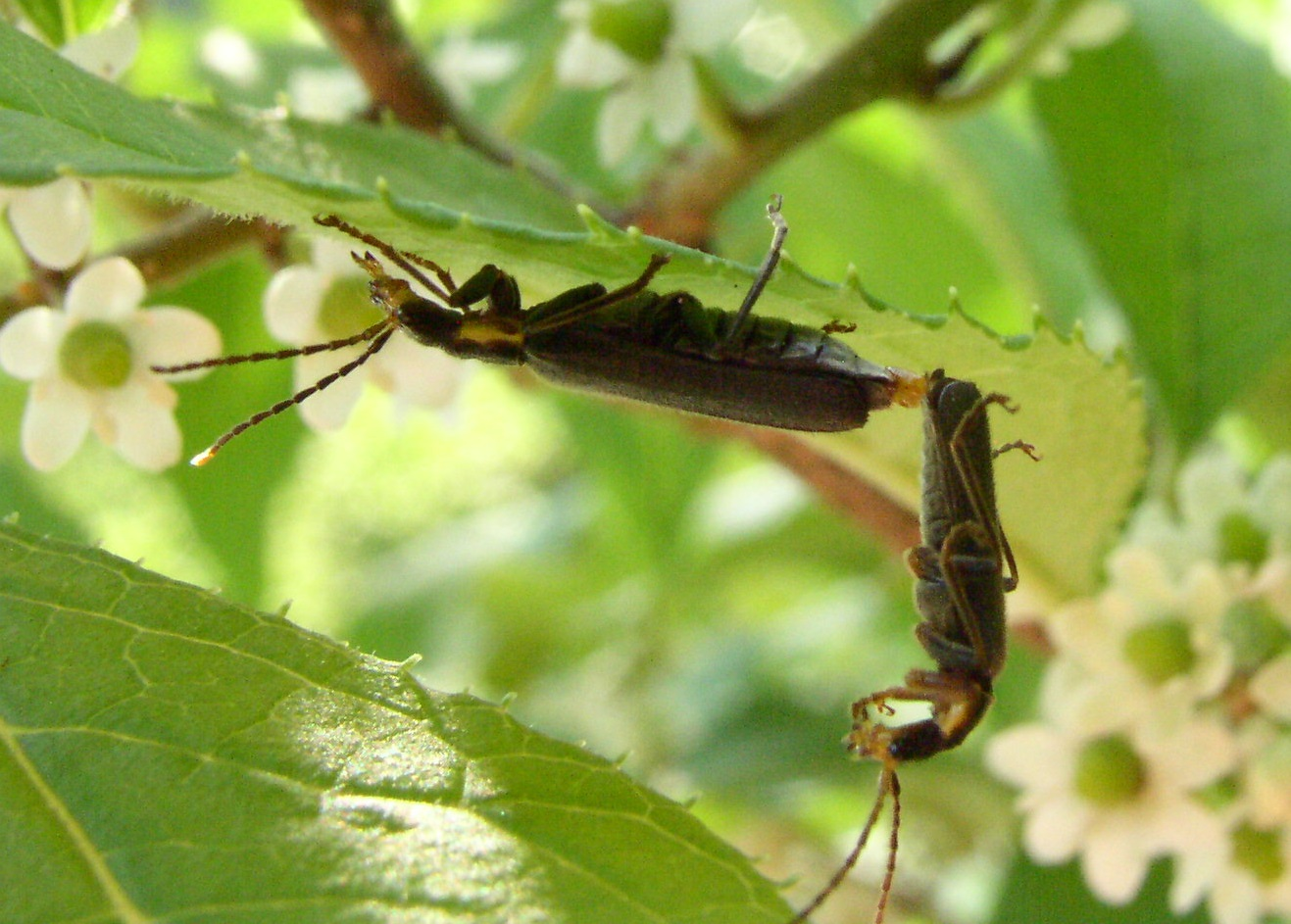
P. rugosulus mating

A wrinkled solder beetle flies into an aphid colony, eating an aphid before being chased away by the ants.

Wrinkled solder beetle searching foliage
