= Cyrtomoptera =

Scientific classification
- Kingdom: Animalia
- Phylum: Arthropoda
- Class: Insecta
- Order: Coleoptera
- Suborder: Polyphaga
- Infraorder: Elateriformia
- Family: Cantharidae
- Tribe: Cantharini
- Genus: Cyrtomoptera; Motschulsky, 1860

Genus of beetles

Cyrtomoptera is a genus of soldier beetles in the family Cantharidae. There are at least two described species in Cyrtomoptera.

== Species ==
These two species belong to the genus Cyrtomoptera:

- Cyrtomoptera dentata McKey-Fender, 1944
- Cyrtomoptera divisa (LeConte, 1851)
