= Podistra =

Scientific classification
- Kingdom: Animalia
- Phylum: Arthropoda
- Clade: Pancrustacea
- Class: Insecta
- Order: Coleoptera
- Suborder: Polyphaga
- Infraorder: Elateriformia
- Family: Cantharidae
- Genus: Podistra; Motschulsky, 1839

Genus of beetles

Podistra is a genus of beetles belonging to the family Cantharidae.

The species of this genus are found in Europe.

Species:

- Podistra belousovi Kazantsev, 2010
- Podistra birnbacheri Krauss, 1894
