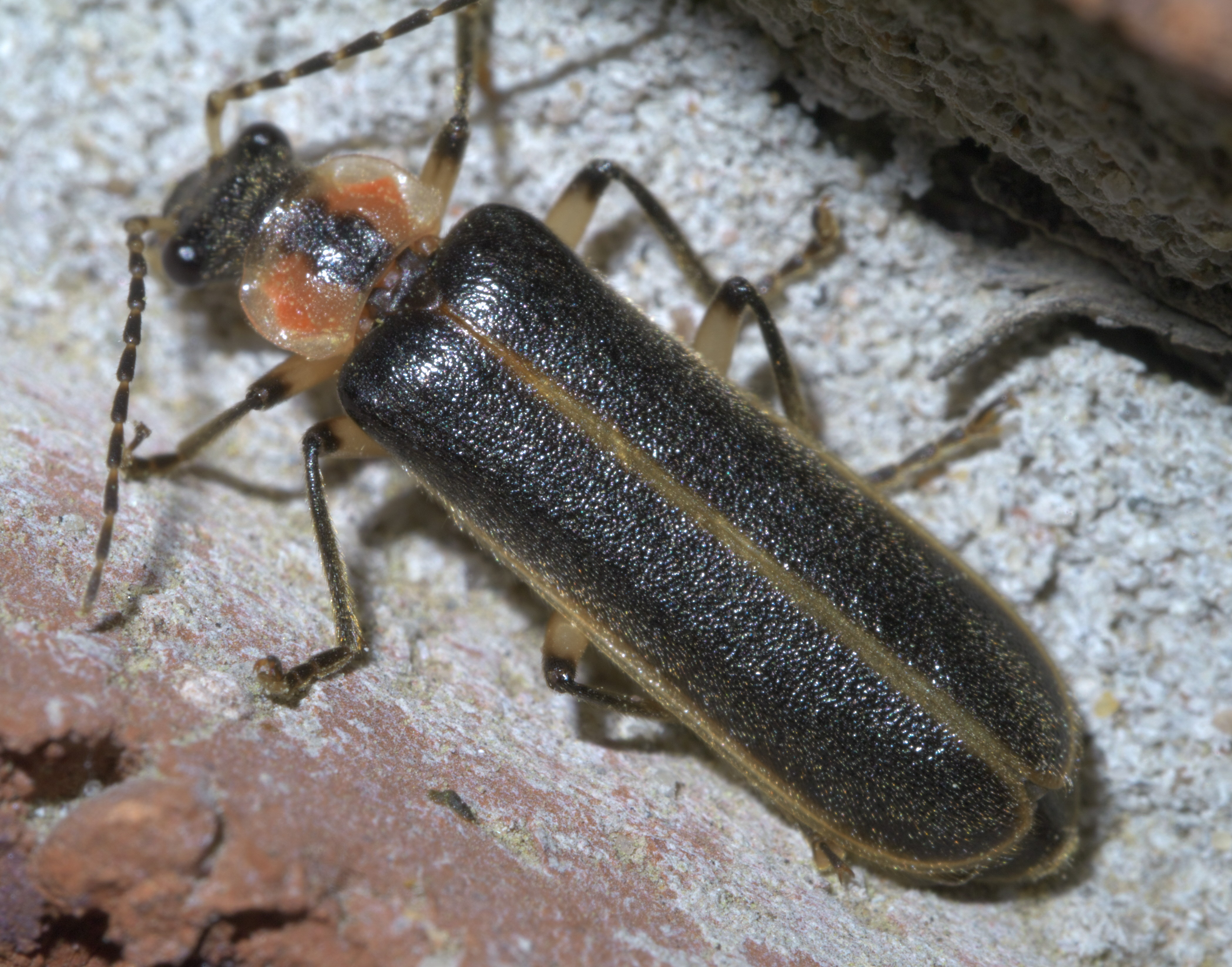
- Podabrus basillaris

Scientific classification
- Kingdom: Animalia
- Phylum: Arthropoda
- Class: Insecta
- Order: Coleoptera
- Suborder: Polyphaga
- Infraorder: Elateriformia
- Family: Cantharidae
- Subfamily: Cantharinae
- Tribe: Podabrini
- Genus: Podabrus; Westwood, 1838

Synonyms
- Brachynotus Kirby, 1837; Imasakapodabrus Takahashi, 2012; Japanopodabrus Takahashi, 2012; Malthacus Kirby, 1837; Nakanepodabrus Takahashi, 2012; Podabrus Fischer de Waldheim, 1821

= Podabrus =

Genus of beetles

Podabrus is a genus of soldier beetles in the family Cantharidae. There are more than 100 described species in Podabrus, recorded from Europe, North America and Asia.

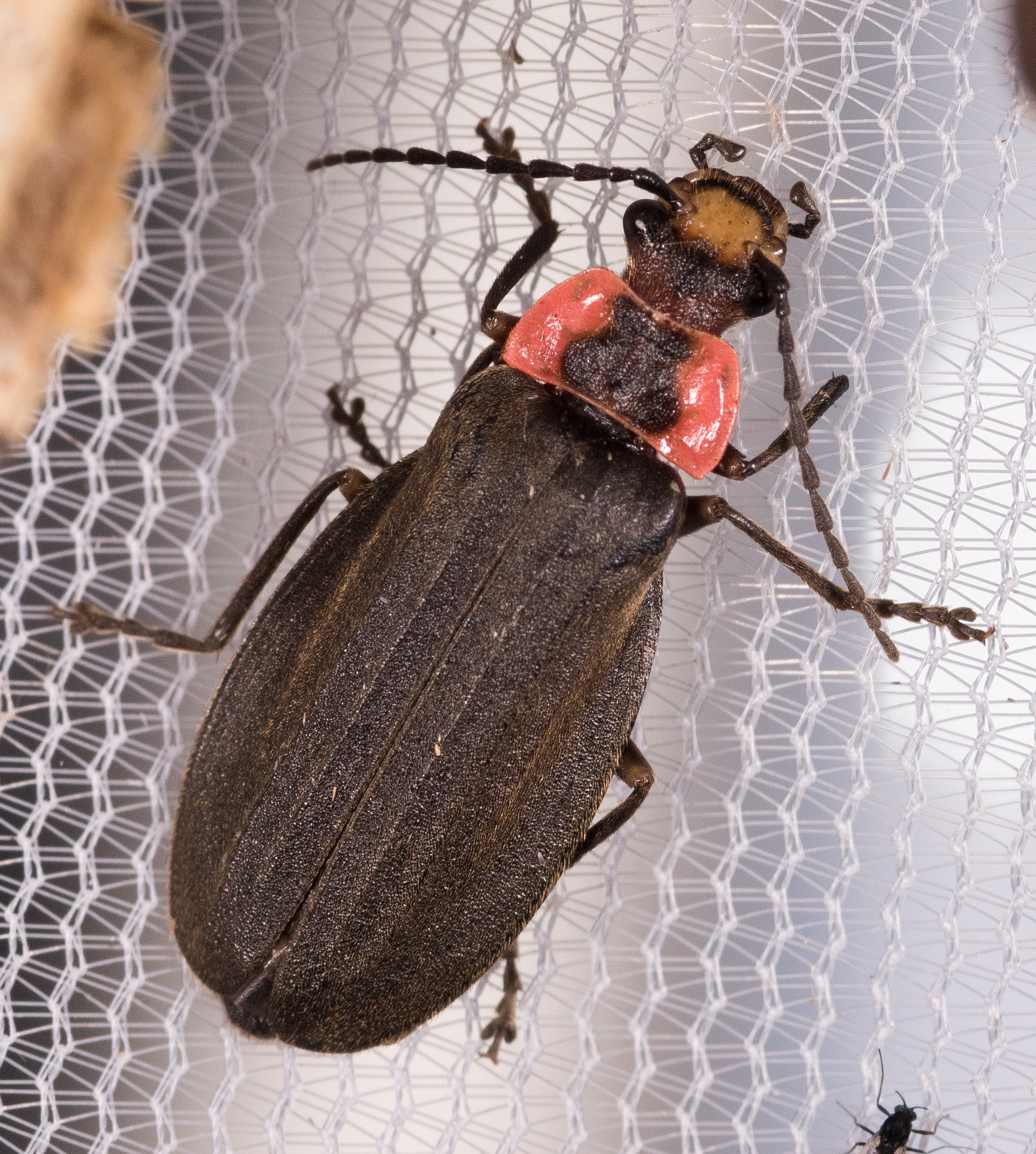
Podabrus tricostatus

== Species ==
These 119 species belong to the genus Podabrus:

- Podabrus albocaudatus Krefft, 1872
- Podabrus alexanderi Fender, 1953
- Podabrus alpinus (Paykull, 1798)
- Podabrus altus Fall, 1928
- Podabrus ambiguus Fall, 1928
- Podabrus annulatus (Mannerheim, 1825)
- Podabrus appendiculatus Fall, 1928
- Podabrus asperipunctatus
- Podabrus basilaris (Say, 1823)
- Podabrus binotatus LeConte, 1881
- Podabrus bolteri LeConte, 1881
- Podabrus brevicollis Fall, 1928
- Podabrus brevipennis LeConte, 1878
- Podabrus brimleyi Green, 1947
- Podabrus brunneus Fender, 1943
- Podabrus brunnicollis (Fabricius, 1801)
- Podabrus californicus Fender, 1948
- Podabrus carmelensis Fender, 1948
- Podabrus cascadensis Fender, 1943
- Podabrus cavicollis LeConte, 1851
- Podabrus cinctipennis LeConte, 1866
- Podabrus circumangulatus
- Podabrus citrinus Fall, 1928
- Podabrus confraternus Fall, 1928
- Podabrus conspiratus Fall, 1926
- Podabrus corneus LeConte, 1861
- Podabrus danielsi Fender, 1943
- Podabrus deceptus Brown, 1940
- Podabrus diadema (Fabricius, 1798)
- Podabrus dietrichi Green, 1947
- Podabrus dilaticollis
- Podabrus dreisbachi Green, 1948
- Podabrus edmundsae Fender, 1953
- Podabrus excursus Fall, 1928
- Podabrus extremus LeConte, 1881
- Podabrus extricatus Fall, 1928
- Podabrus falli Hopping, 1929
- Podabrus fayi LeConte, 1866
- Podabrus fenestratus Fall, 1928
- Podabrus fissilis Fall, 1926
- Podabrus fissus LeConte, 1881
- Podabrus flavicollis LeConte, 1851
- Podabrus flavimanus
- Podabrus fragilis
- Podabrus frater LeConte, 1851
- Podabrus frosti Fender, 1946
- Podabrus fulvus Fall, 1928
- Podabrus fumiganus Green, 1948
- Podabrus furtivus Fall, 1928
- Podabrus gracilis Fall, 1928
- Podabrus hackerae Fender in Hatch, 1962
- Podabrus heteronychus Fall, 1928
- Podabrus illex Fall, 1928
- Podabrus infumatus Green, 1949
- Podabrus instabilis Fall, 1928
- Podabrus intrusus Green, 1947
- Podabrus kiiensis
- Podabrus knobeli Fall, 1928
- Podabrus knowltoni Fender, 1948
- Podabrus kurbatovi
- Podabrus laevicollis (Kirby in Richards, 1837)
- Podabrus lateralis LeConte in Wheeler, 1876
- Podabrus latimanus (Motschulsky, 1860)
- Podabrus limatus Fall, 1928
- Podabrus limbellus LeConte, 1881
- Podabrus longicornis Fall, 1928
- Podabrus longissimus
- Podabrus lucidatus Fender, 1948
- Podabrus lutosus LeConte, 1881
- Podabrus lygarius Fender in Hatch, 1962
- Podabrus macer LeConte, 1861
- Podabrus malheurensis Fender in Hatch, 1962
- Podabrus mellitus LeConte, 1881
- Podabrus melvillei Fender in Hatch, 1962
- Podabrus modestus (Say, 1823)
- Podabrus modulatus Fall, 1928
- Podabrus moestus Fall, 1928
- Podabrus muliebris Fall, 1928
- Podabrus nothoides LeConte, 1881
- Podabrus obscurevittatus Fall, 1928
- Podabrus occipitalis Fall, 1928
- Podabrus ochocensis Fender, 1953
- Podabrus oreumsensis
- Podabrus pattoni LeConte, 1866
- Podabrus perplexus Brown, 1940
- Podabrus piceatus Fender, 1953
- Podabrus piniphilus (Eschscholtz, 1830)
- Podabrus planulus Green, 1947
- Podabrus probus Fall, 1928
- Podabrus protensus LeConte, 1866
- Podabrus pruinosus LeConte, 1851 (downy leather-winged beetle)
- Podabrus puberulus LeConte in Agassiz, 1850
- Podabrus punctatus LeConte in Agassiz, 1850
- Podabrus puncticollis (Kirby in Richards, 1837)
- Podabrus punctulatus LeConte, 1859
- Podabrus pustulatus Fender in Hatch, 1962
- Podabrus pygmaeus Green, 1948
- Podabrus quadratus LeConte, 1881
- Podabrus rossi Fender, 1948
- Podabrus rugosulus LeConte, 1850
- Podabrus scaber LeConte, 1861
- Podabrus schuhi Fender in Hatch, 1962
- Podabrus secretus Brown, 1940
- Podabrus sericatus (Mannerheim, 1846)
- Podabrus sierrae Fall, 1928
- Podabrus simplex Couper, 1865
- Podabrus smithi Fender, 1948
- Podabrus stehri Miskimen, 1956
- Podabrus tejonicus LeConte, 1859
- Podabrus temporalis
- Podabrus tenuis Fall, 1928
- Podabrus tetragonoderus Fall, 1926
- Podabrus tomentosus (Say, 1825)
- Podabrus tricostatus (Say, 1835)
- Podabrus vandykei Fender, 1949
- Podabrus vernalis Green, 1948
- Podabrus viduus Fall, 1928
- Podabrus xanthoderus LeConte, 1881
- Podabrus youngi Fender, 1979
