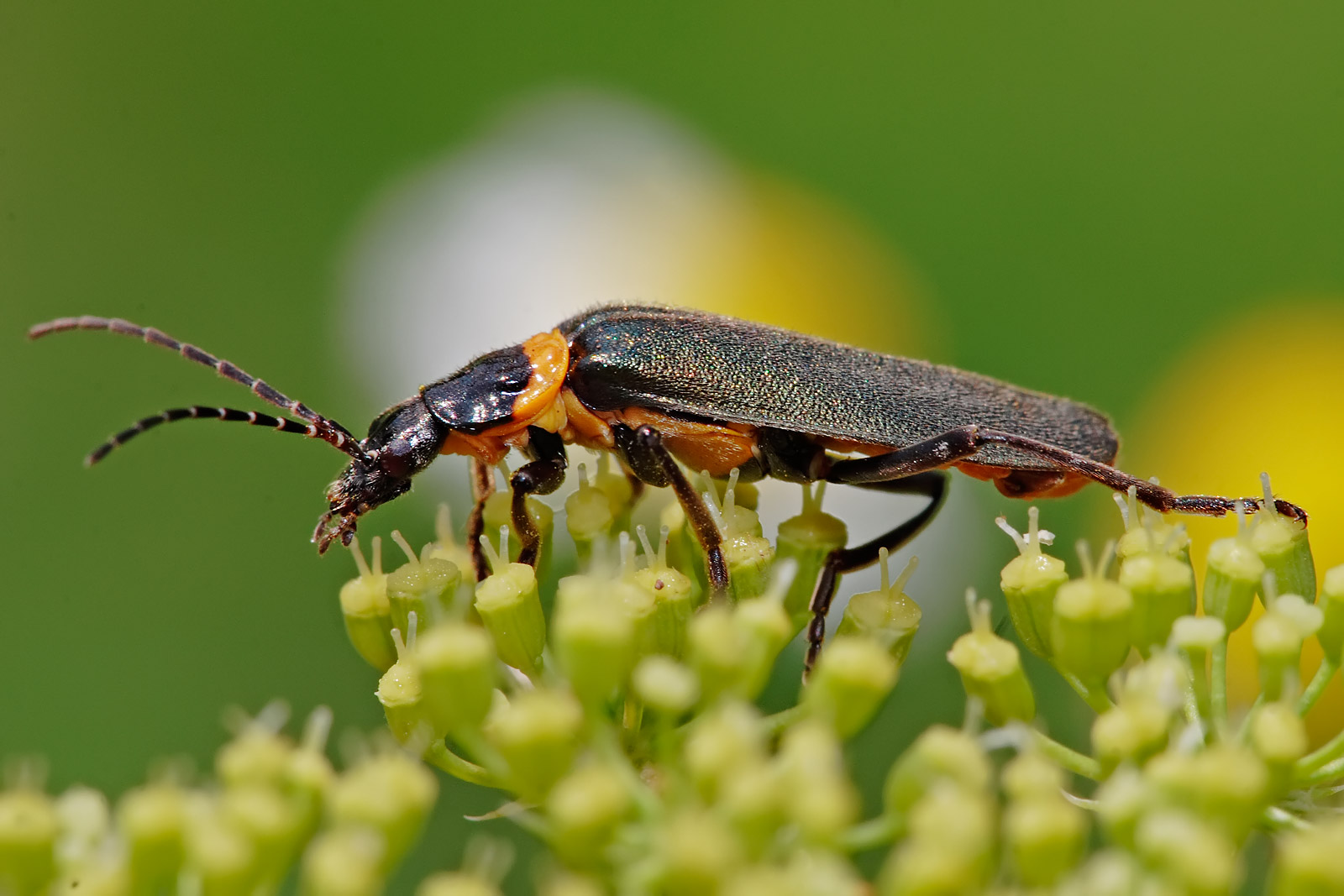
- Chauliognathus lugubris

Scientific classification
- Kingdom: Animalia
- Phylum: Arthropoda
- Clade: Pancrustacea
- Class: Insecta
- Order: Coleoptera
- Suborder: Polyphaga
- Infraorder: Elateriformia
- Superfamily: Elateroidea
- Family: Cantharidae; Imhoff, 1856

Synonyms
- Chauliognathidae

= Soldier beetle =

Soldier beetle Temporal range: Albian–Present

Family of beetles

Soldier beetle filmed in Hesse, Germany

A wrinkled solder beetle flies into an aphid colony, eating an aphid before being chased away by the ants.

Wrinkled solder beetle searching foliage

Goldenrod soldier beetles foraging on yellow ironweed.

Goldenrod soldier beetles taking flight from yellow ironweed, followed by slow motion (taken at 3,840 frames per second.

The soldier beetles (Cantharidae) are relatively soft-bodied, straight-sided beetles. They are cosmopolitan in distribution. One of the first described species has a color pattern reminiscent of the red coats of early British soldiers, hence the common name. They are also known commonly as leatherwings because of their soft elytra.

Historically, these beetles were placed in a superfamily "Cantharoidea", which has been subsumed by the superfamily Elateroidea; the name is still sometimes used as a rankless grouping, including the families Cantharidae, Lampyridae, Lycidae, Omethidae (which includes Telegeusidae), Phengodidae, and Rhagophthalmidae.

Soldier beetles often feed on nectar and pollen as well as predating other small insects. The larvae are caterpillar like, dark colored, active and covered in fine hairs, earning them the name velvet worms. They feed on the ground and in foliage hunting eggs, small insects, snails and other small creatures.

== Evolutionary history ==
The oldest described member of the family is Molliberus from the Early Cretaceous (early Albian)–aged El Soplao amber from Cantabria, Spain, belonging to the tribe Cantharini in the subfamily Cantharinae. Other described genera include six from the early Late Cretaceous (early Cenomanian)–aged Burmese amber, with five belonging to Cantharinae and one to Malthininae, and Katyacantharis, from the Cenomanian-aged Agdzhakend amber of Azerbaijan, suggested to belong to Cantharinae. Indeterminate specimens have been reported from the Aptian-aged Koonwarra Fossil Bed, Australia and the Barremian-aged Lebanese amber.

== Subfamilies, tribes and selected genera ==
Five subfamilies are normally accepted:

=== Cantharinae ===
- tribe Cantharini
  - Cantharis
  - Rhagonycha
- tribe Podabrini
  - Podabrus

=== Chauliognathinae ===
- tribe Chauliognathini
  - Belotus
  - Chauliognathus
- tribe Ichthyurini
  - Trypherus

=== Dysmorphocerinae ===
- Afronycha Wittmer, 1949 - central-southern Africa
- Asilis Broun, 1893 - New Zealand
- Compsonycha
- Dysmorphocerus Solier, 1849
- Flabelloontelus
- Geigyella Wittmer, 1972 - New Guinea
- Hansasilis
- Heteromastix Boheman, 1858 - Australia
- Hyponotum
- Micronotum
- Neoontelus Wittmer, 1972 - New Zealand
- Oontelus Solier, 1849 - S. America
- Plectocephalon
- Plectonotum Gorham, 1891 - Americas

=== Malthininae ===
- tribe Malchinini
  - Macrocerus Motschulsky, 1845 - Europe (synonym Malchinus)
- tribe Malthinini
  - Caccodes Sharp, 1885 - Central America, Pacific islands
  - Malthinellus Kiesenwetter, 1874 - Japan
  - Malthinus Latreille, 1805 - Japan, Europe, N. America
- tribe Malthodini
  - Frostia Bert. ex Guill.
  - Malthodes Kiesenwetter, 1852 - mostly Europe, N. America & New Zealand
  - †Archaeomalthodes Hsiao et al. 2016 Burmese amber, Myanmar, Cenomanian

=== Silinae ===
- tribe Silini
  - Cordylocera Guérin-Méneville, 1830
  - Silis Charpentier, 1825
- tribe Tytthonyxini
  - Tytthonyx LeConte, 1851

== Reproduction ==
Large males of the soldier beetle exercise choice for larger females. Body size correlates with the abilities of males to secure females, and of females to evade males.

== See also ==
- List of Cantharidae genera
