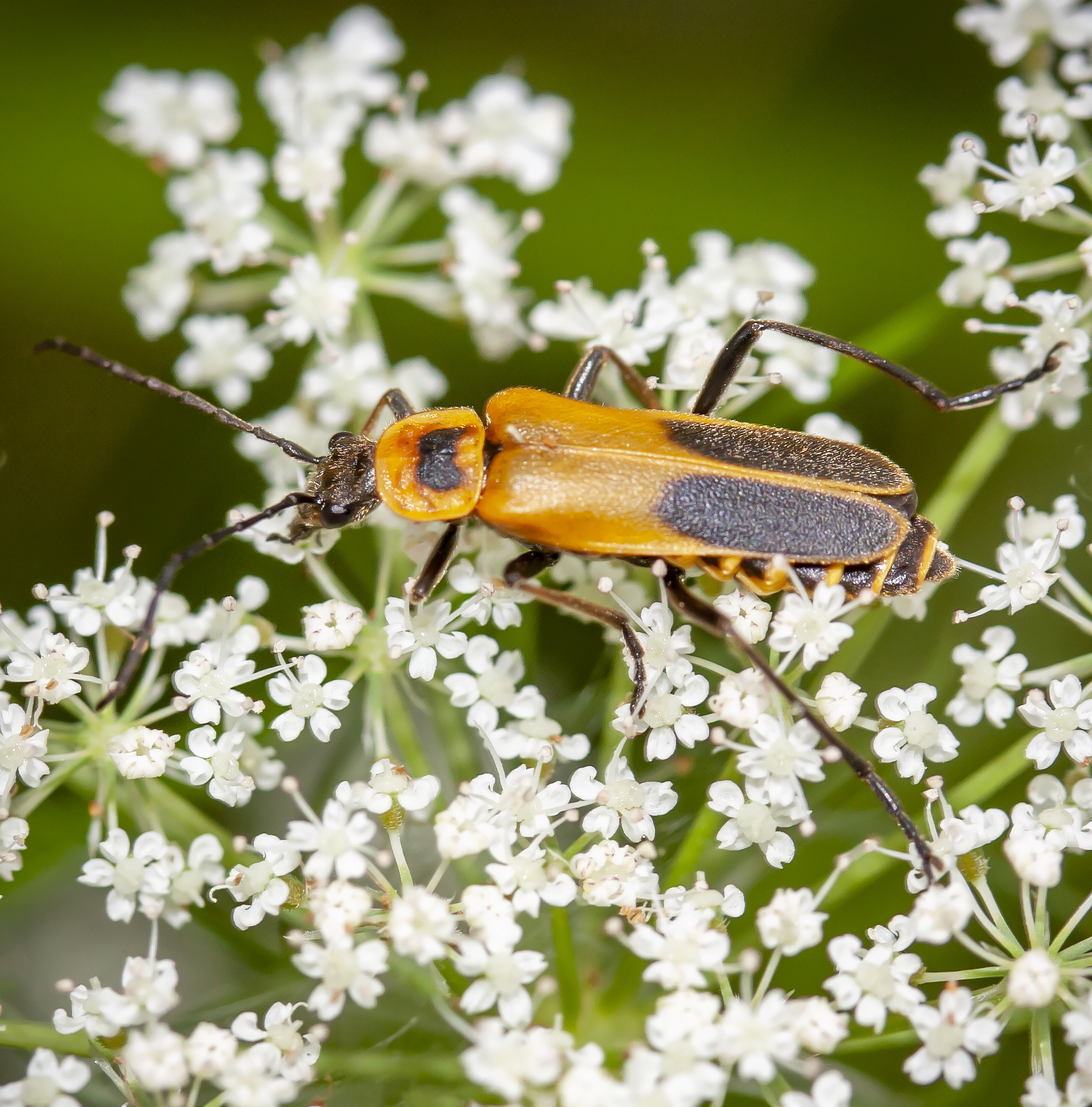

Scientific classification
- Kingdom: Animalia
- Phylum: Arthropoda
- Clade: Pancrustacea
- Class: Insecta
- Order: Coleoptera
- Suborder: Polyphaga
- Infraorder: Elateriformia
- Family: Cantharidae
- Genus: Chauliognathus
- Species: C. pensylvanicus

Binomial name
- Chauliognathus pensylvanicus (DeGeer, 1774)

Synonyms
- Chauliognathus pennsylvanicus

= Goldenrod soldier beetle =

Species of beetle

The goldenrod soldier beetle or Pennsylvania leatherwing (Chauliognathus pensylvanicus) is a species of soldier beetle (Cantharidae).

== Nomenclature ==
The specific epithet pensylvanicus is Latin for "of Pennsylvania". The spelling with one n was in common use at the time (de Geer says in the description that the specimen was sent to him from 'Pensylvanie'), so the species name based on it cannot be corrected under the rules governing scientific names.

== Distribution ==
The species is native to North America and is one of the most common species of soldier beetle in the Midwest. It ranges from Eastern to Central Canada down through Florida and Northern Texas. Some populations can be seen as far west as Colorado.

== Morphology ==
Soldier beetles are just around five-eighths of an inch (1.6 cm) long. They have elongated, leathery elytra that cover almost the entirety of their abdomen. They are an orangish, brownish color and have distinct black patches. They also have a dark spot on their pronotum that is elongated horizontally. This is essential for identifying the species when comparing it to margined leatherwing (Chauliognathus marginatus), which is elongated vertically.

== Life cycle ==
Adults of the species are univoltine, meaning they only reproduce once a year. Adult females lay clusters of eggs in soil or leaf litter. Larvae have a slender body and are dark colored with dense hairs. During this stage, they mostly reside in the leaf litter, but can climb plants. Overwintering of larvae happens in the soil. They feed on grasshopper eggs, small caterpillars and other soft-bodied insects. These larvae then go through a pupal stage in early summer before becoming an adult, emerging around July.

== Ecology ==
Adults are active in late summer and early fall. They are most abundant during the month of August. Adults are diurnal and congregate on flowers, especially goldenrods, which inspired their name. C. pensylvanicus has been identified as an important pollinator of the prairie onion, milkweed, Queen Anne's lace, and many species of the Asteraceae family, including goldenrods, black-eyed susans and asters. While adults feed on nectar and pollen, they transfer pollen between flowers, aiding in the pollination process. Not only do they feed on flowers, but they also eat small insects such as aphids and caterpillars.

According to both lab tests and field observations, the beetle strongly prefers yellow flowers. Goldenrod soldier beetles have leptokurtic dispersal patterns, meaning they only move short distances. Dispersal patterns are also sex-dependent. Males have been found to cluster in areas of high flower density, whereas female dispersal patterns are dependent on male locality rather than plant locality.

== Defense mechanisms ==
Soldier beetles defend themselves by releasing a sticky white fluid when threatened. This fluid comes from glands along their abdomen and contains a powerful natural compound called dihydromatricaria acid (DHMA). DHMA works as an anti-feedant, meaning predators such as spiders or birds quickly learn not to eat them. Their yellow and black color patterning is also thought to be aposematic coloration, a defense mechanism signaling their bad taste. The secretion also helps protect the beetle’s eggs from being eaten or infected. Soldier beetles can make this defensive compound on their own using a unique set of enzymes. This makes their chemical defense system one of the more unusual and specialized among insects.

== Parasites ==
Adult C. pensylvanicus may be infected by the fungus Eryniopsis lampyridarum. After the fungus infects the host, it takes about two weeks for it to eventually kill its host. Before the host dies, the fungus orders the beetle to climb a plant and then attach itself to a flower by biting down with its mandibles into flower heads. About 15–22 hours later, the fungus causes the dead beetles to raise their elytra and expand their metathoracic wings in order to maximize infection of other beetles. With their wings raised, the dead beetles may still attract mates as live males have been observed mating with the deceased. The infected male can then transmit spores by mating with multiple other females. Additionally, the spores protruding from the deceased insect fall to the ground, overwinter in the soil, and infect beetles the following year.

== Effects on humans ==
Goldenrod soldier beetles are harmless to both humans and plants. Therefore, there is no need to control them. In fact, they provide some benefits to humans. They act as natural pest control, feeding on eggs of various pests, and are important pollinators. While considered minor pollinators, their contribution is still significant, pollinating goldenrods, asters, milkweed, and other native plants.

== Gallery ==
Goldenrod soldier beetles foraging on yellow ironweed

Goldenrod soldier beetles mating on yellow ironweed

Goldenrod soldier beetles taking flight from yellow ironweed, followed by slow motion (taken at 3,840 frames per second)

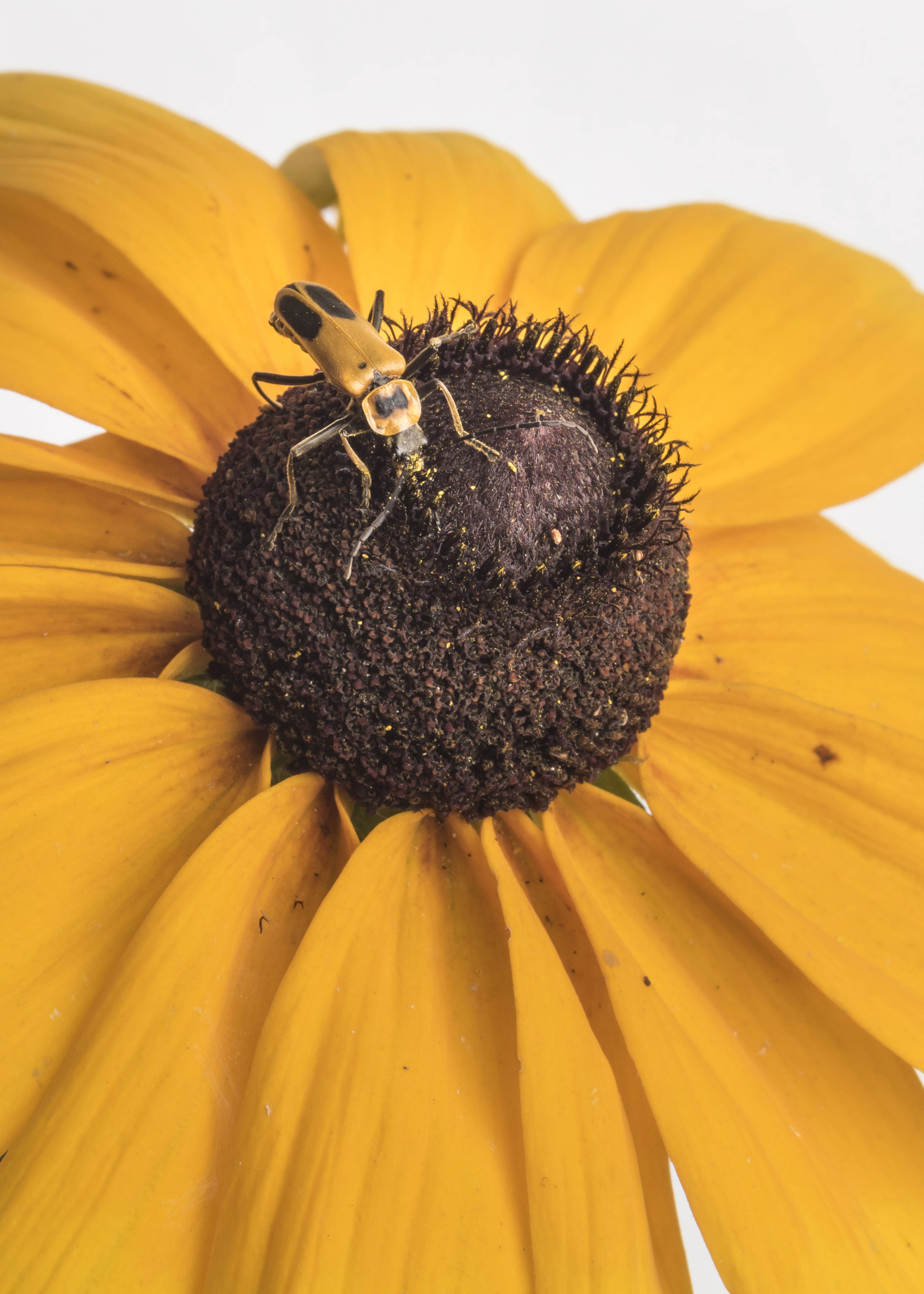
Goldenrod soldier beetle pollinating coneflower
