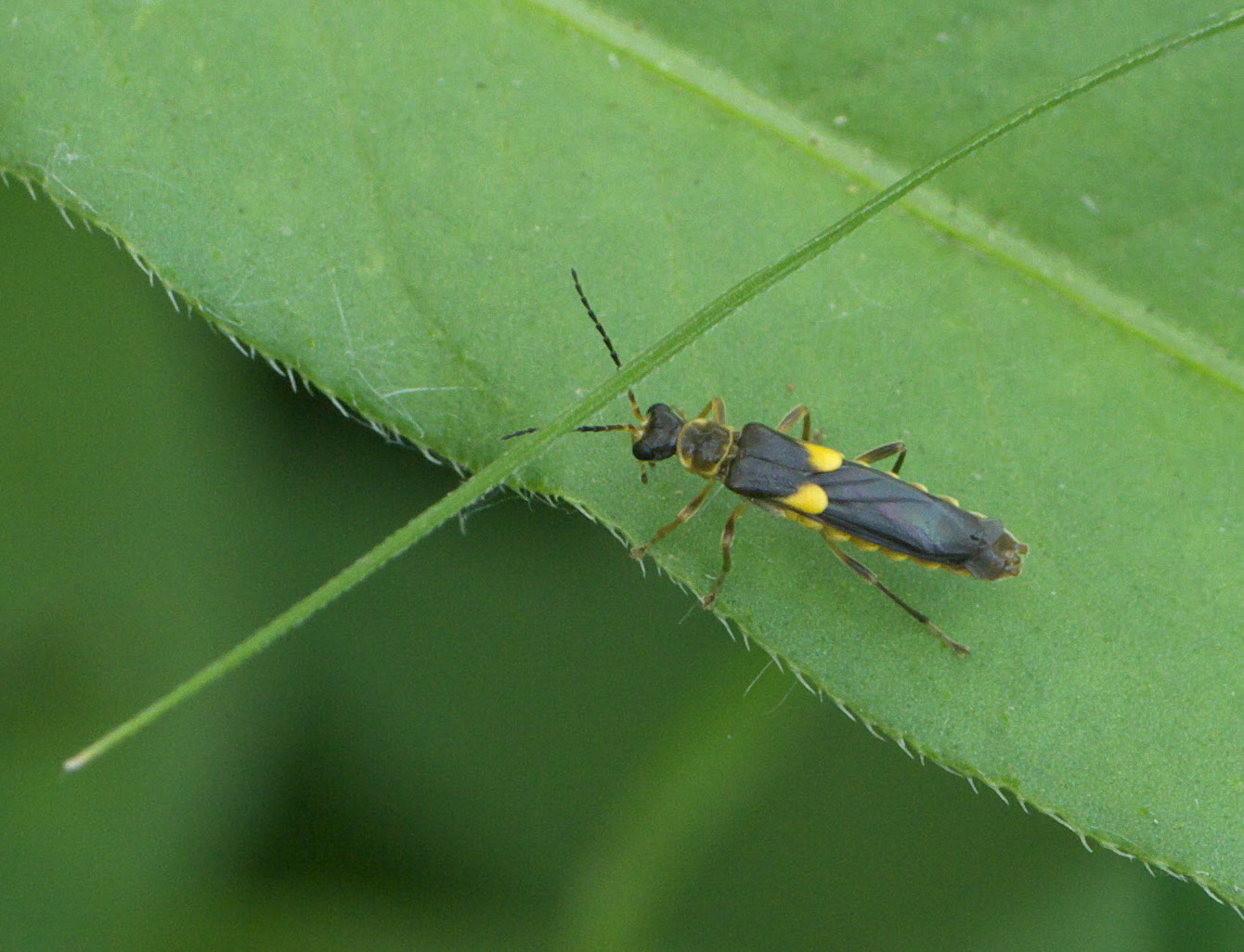
- Trypherus frisoni

Scientific classification
- Kingdom: Animalia
- Phylum: Arthropoda
- Class: Insecta
- Order: Coleoptera
- Suborder: Polyphaga
- Infraorder: Elateriformia
- Family: Cantharidae
- Subfamily: Chauliognathinae; LeConte, 1861

= Chauliognathinae =

Subfamily of beetles

Chauliognathinae is a subfamily of soldier beetles in the family Cantharidae. There are at least 4 genera and at least 20 described species in Chauliognathinae.

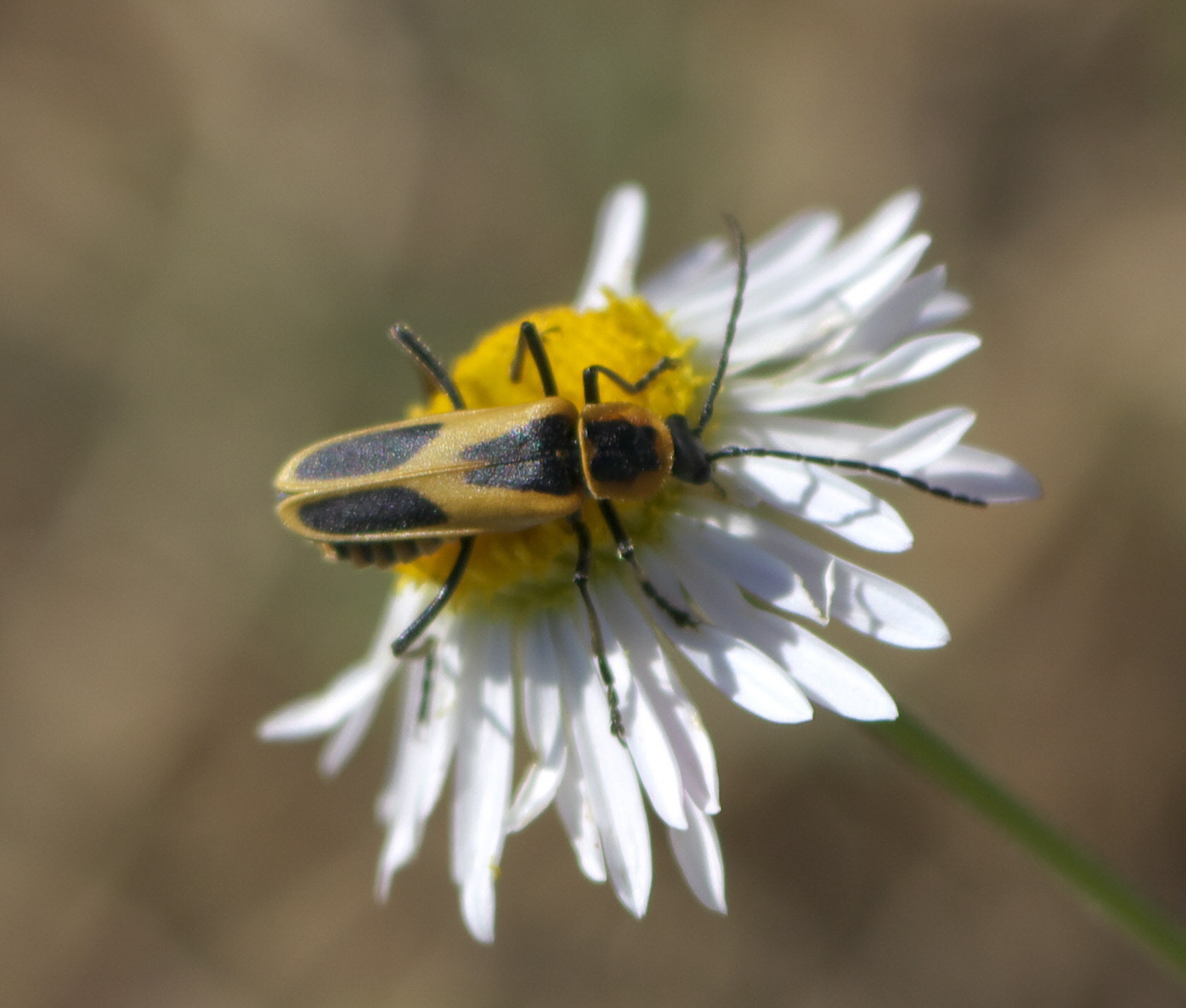
Chauliognathus scutellaris

== Genera ==
- Belotus Gorham, 1881
- Chauliognathus Hentz, 1830
- Ichthyurus Westwood, 1848
- Trypherus LeConte, 1851
