= Eryniopsis lampyridarum =

Scientific classification
- Domain: Eukaryota
- Kingdom: Fungi
- Division: Entomophthoromycota
- Class: Entomophthoromycetes
- Order: Entomophthorales
- Family: Entomophthoraceae
- Genus: Eryniopsis
- Species: E. lampyridarum

Binomial name
- Eryniopsis lampyridarum (Thaxt.) Humber, 1984

Species of fungus

Eryniopsis lampyridarum is an entomopathogenic fungus and its host is the soldier beetle, either Chauliognathus marginatus or Chauliognathus pensylvanicus. Eryniopsis lampyridarum is mind controlling for the soldier beetle and can manipulate the beetle into doing things that it wouldn't normally do. Once the fungus has established itself inside the beetle, it sends the infected beetle on a mission to find a specific daisy flower Asteraceae. The soldier beetle will clamp its mouthpiece onto the flower as tight as it can, while it awaits its death. The parasitic fungus forces the dead beetle to then spread its wings wide in a dramatic pose; this makes the beetle look bigger as if it is seeking out a mate. The fungus makes sure the dying beetle will attract more beetles so it can spread its spores. The fungus makes sure the beetle spreads its wings only at daybreak. It is also strange that the beetle will be dead for hours and then suddenly it will spread its wings at daylight, just in time to attract potential mates to its dead body. This is because the fungus is in control of the beetle's body functions. Then, when an uninfected beetle comes along to socialize with the dead beetle, the fungus' spores spread to the new beetle.

Not all beetles will end up at a daisy flower. Some will die and fall to the ground. In this case, the parasitic fungus creates many spores that will be resistant to the environment and remain infective for many months. The spores will remain infective in the soil, awaiting the next season where they can infect more soldier beetles.

This parasite was first discovered in North Carolina in the late 1970s, early 1980s. It has been found only in eastern and central North America, although its host, the soldier beetle, is found in southern Canada as well.
