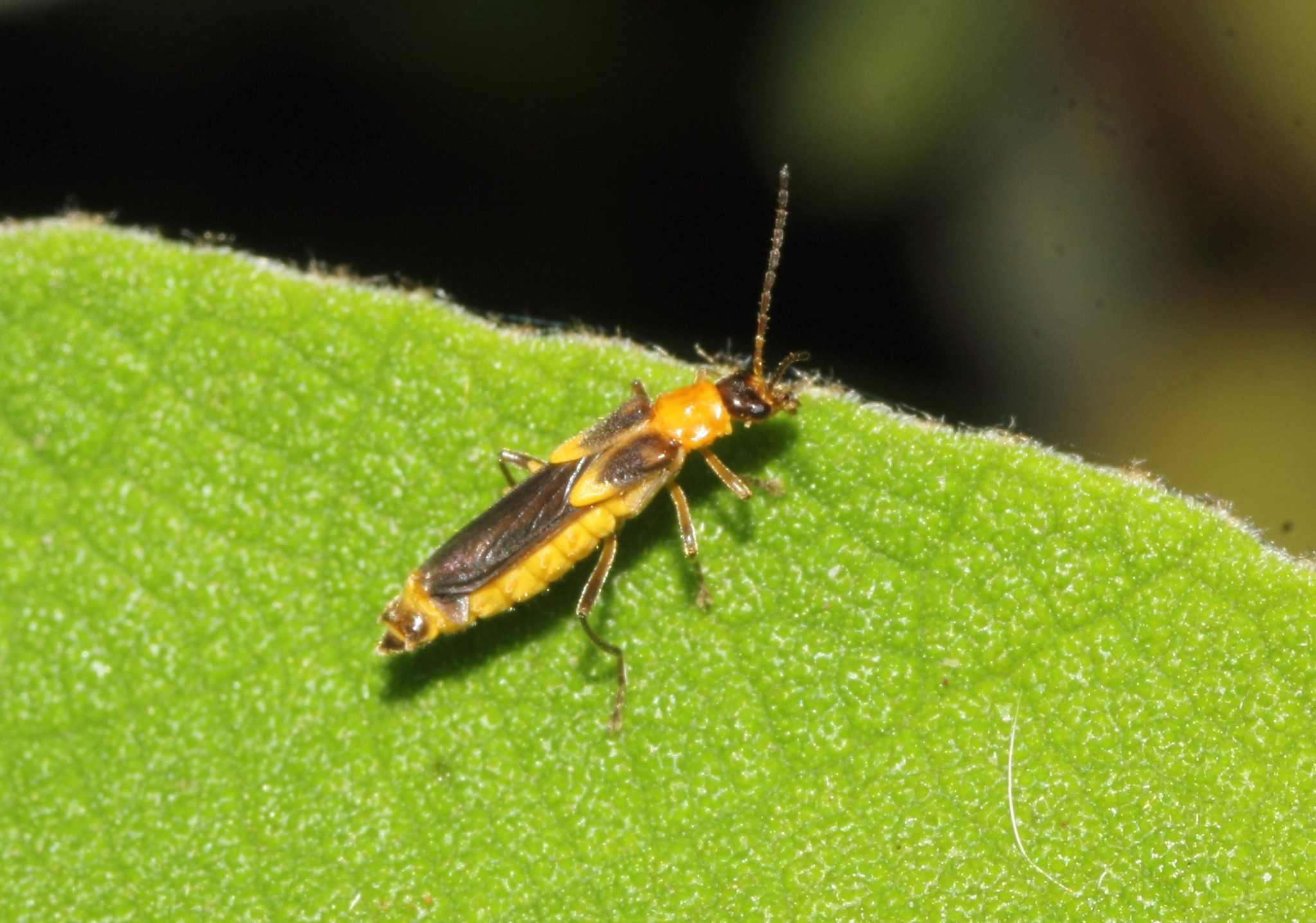

Scientific classification
- Domain: Eukaryota
- Kingdom: Animalia
- Phylum: Arthropoda
- Class: Insecta
- Order: Coleoptera
- Suborder: Polyphaga
- Infraorder: Elateriformia
- Family: Cantharidae
- Genus: Belotus
- Species: B. bicolor

Binomial name
- Belotus bicolor Brancucci, 1979

= Belotus bicolor =

Species of beetle

Belotus bicolor is a species of soldier beetle in the family Cantharidae. It is found in Central and North America.
