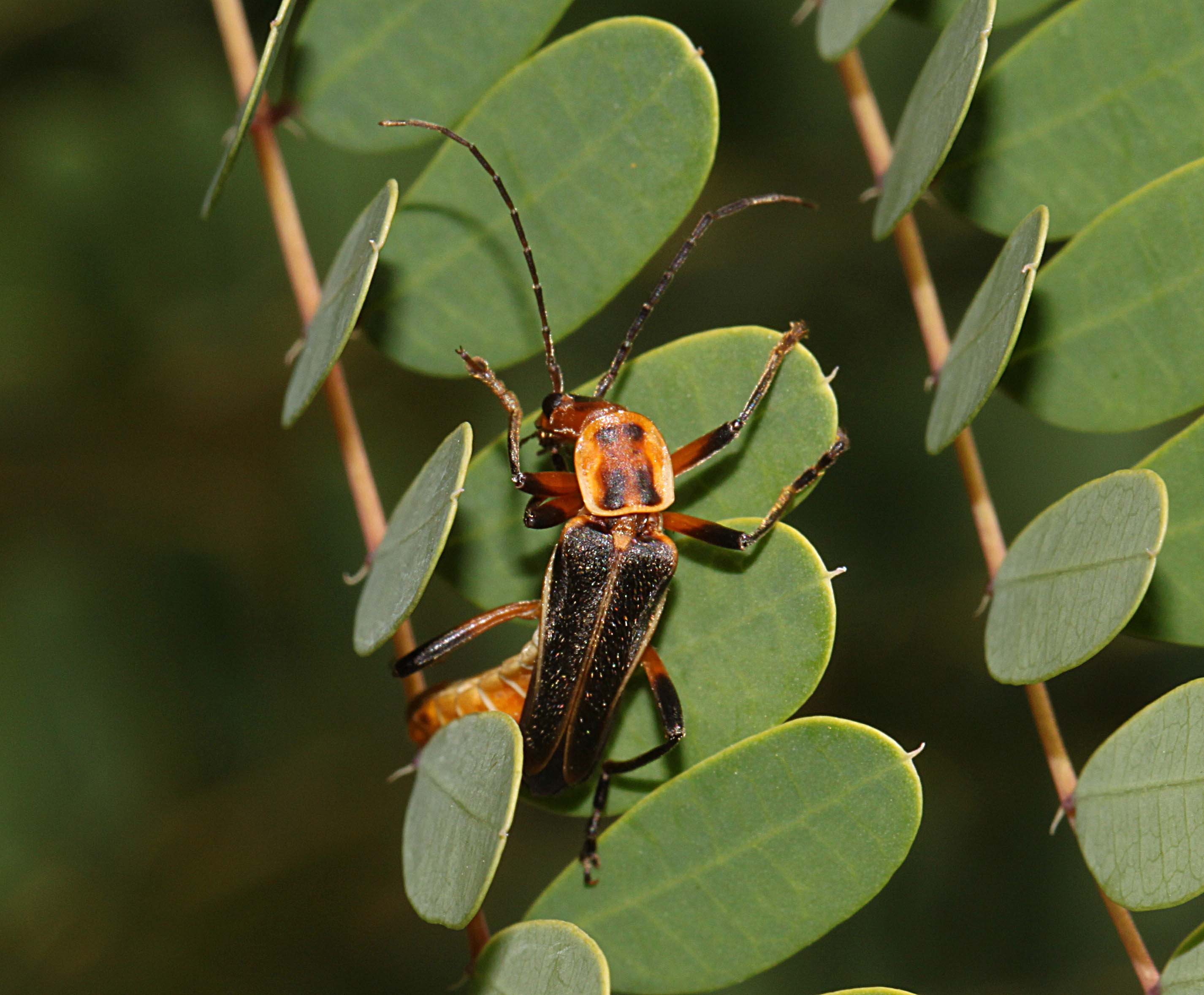

Scientific classification
- Domain: Eukaryota
- Kingdom: Animalia
- Phylum: Arthropoda
- Class: Insecta
- Order: Coleoptera
- Suborder: Polyphaga
- Infraorder: Elateriformia
- Family: Cantharidae
- Genus: Chauliognathus
- Species: C. obscurus

Binomial name
- Chauliognathus obscurus Schaeffer, 1909

= Chauliognathus obscurus =

Species of beetle

Chauliognathus obscurus is a species of soldier beetle in the family Cantharidae. It is found in Arizona (United States) and Mexico.

Chauliognathus obscurus males measure 7.5–9.5 mm (0.30–0.37 in) and females 9–11 mm (0.35–0.43 in).

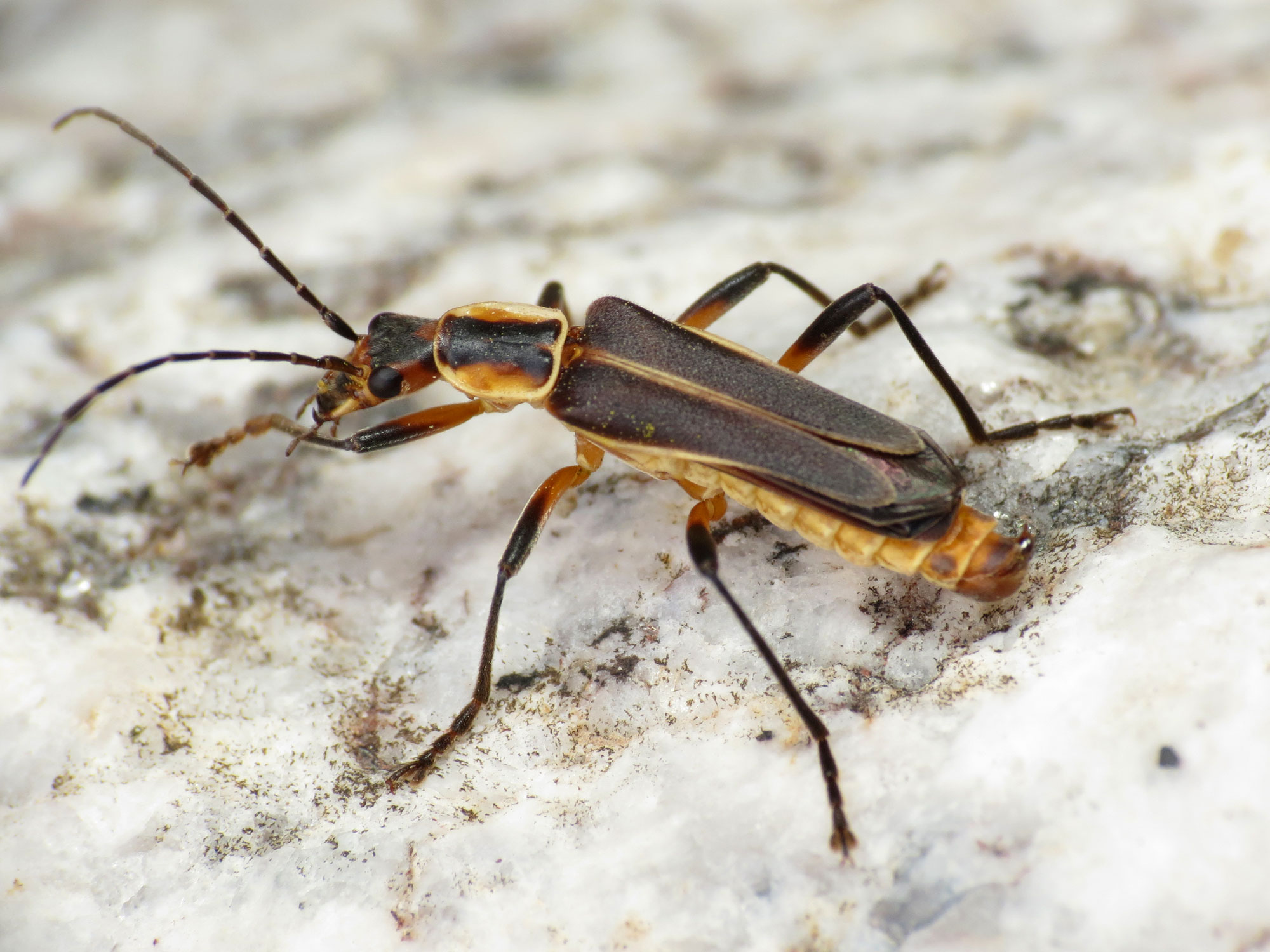
