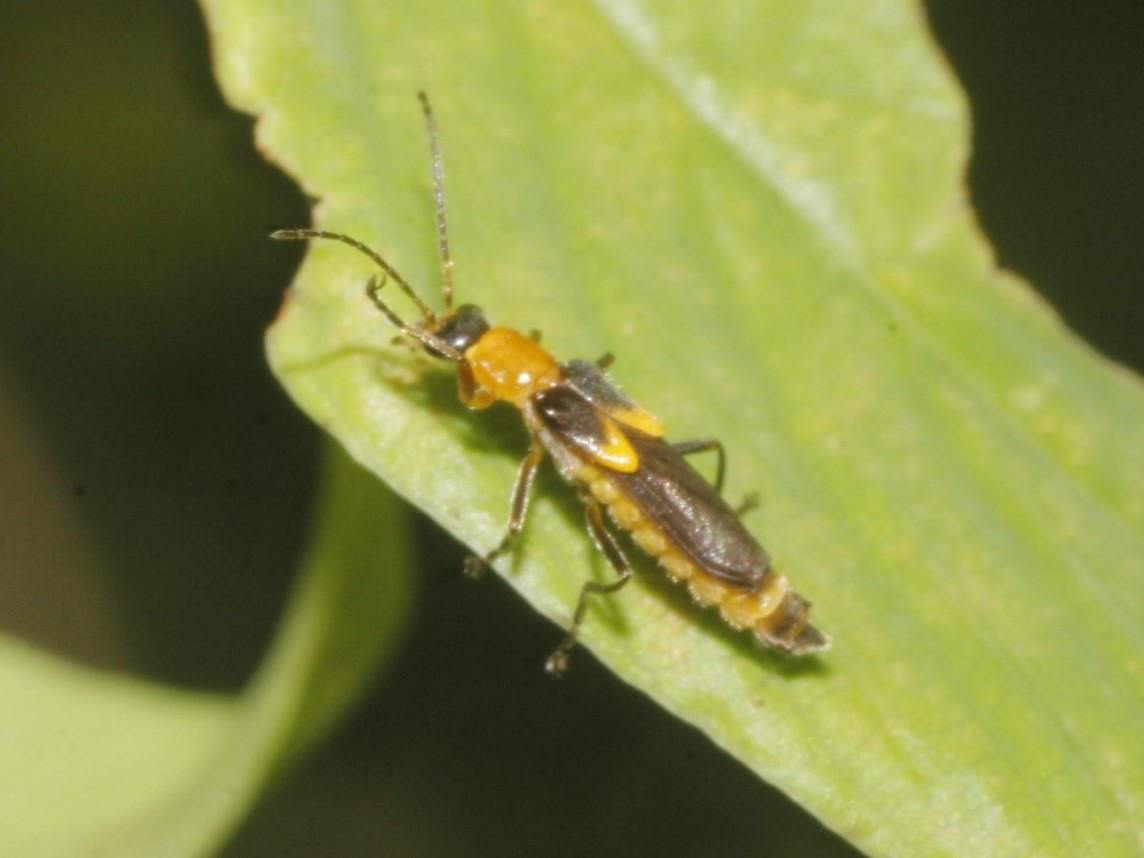

Scientific classification
- Domain: Eukaryota
- Kingdom: Animalia
- Phylum: Arthropoda
- Class: Insecta
- Order: Coleoptera
- Suborder: Polyphaga
- Infraorder: Elateriformia
- Family: Cantharidae
- Genus: Belotus
- Species: B. abdominalis

Binomial name
- Belotus abdominalis (LeConte, 1851)

= Belotus abdominalis =

Species of beetle

Belotus abdominalis is a species of soldier beetle in the family Cantharidae. It is found in Central America and North America.
