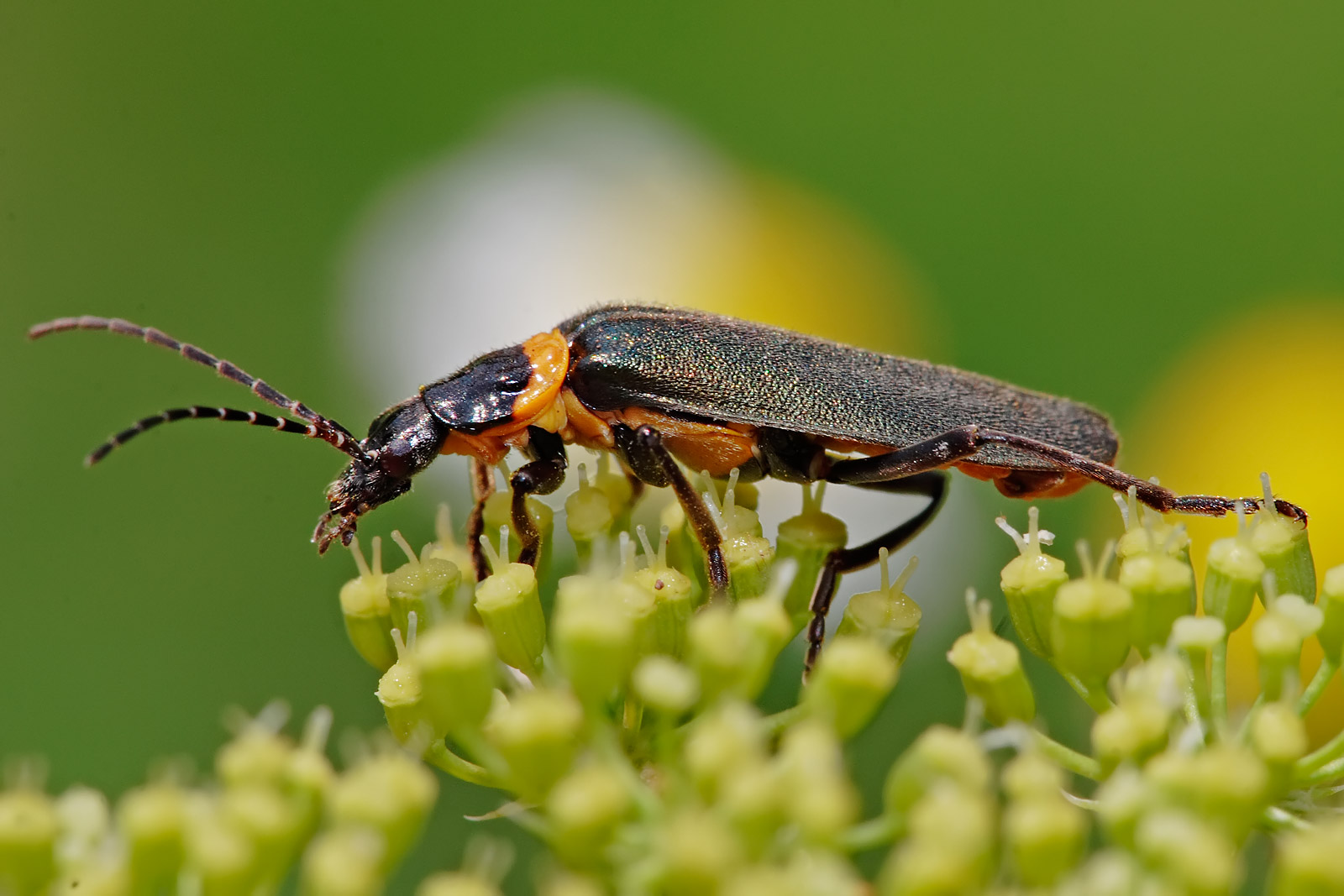

Scientific classification
- Kingdom: Animalia
- Phylum: Arthropoda
- Clade: Pancrustacea
- Class: Insecta
- Order: Coleoptera
- Suborder: Polyphaga
- Infraorder: Elateriformia
- Family: Cantharidae
- Genus: Chauliognathus
- Species: C. lugubris

Binomial name
- Chauliognathus lugubris Fabricius, 1801

= Chauliognathus lugubris =

Species of beetle

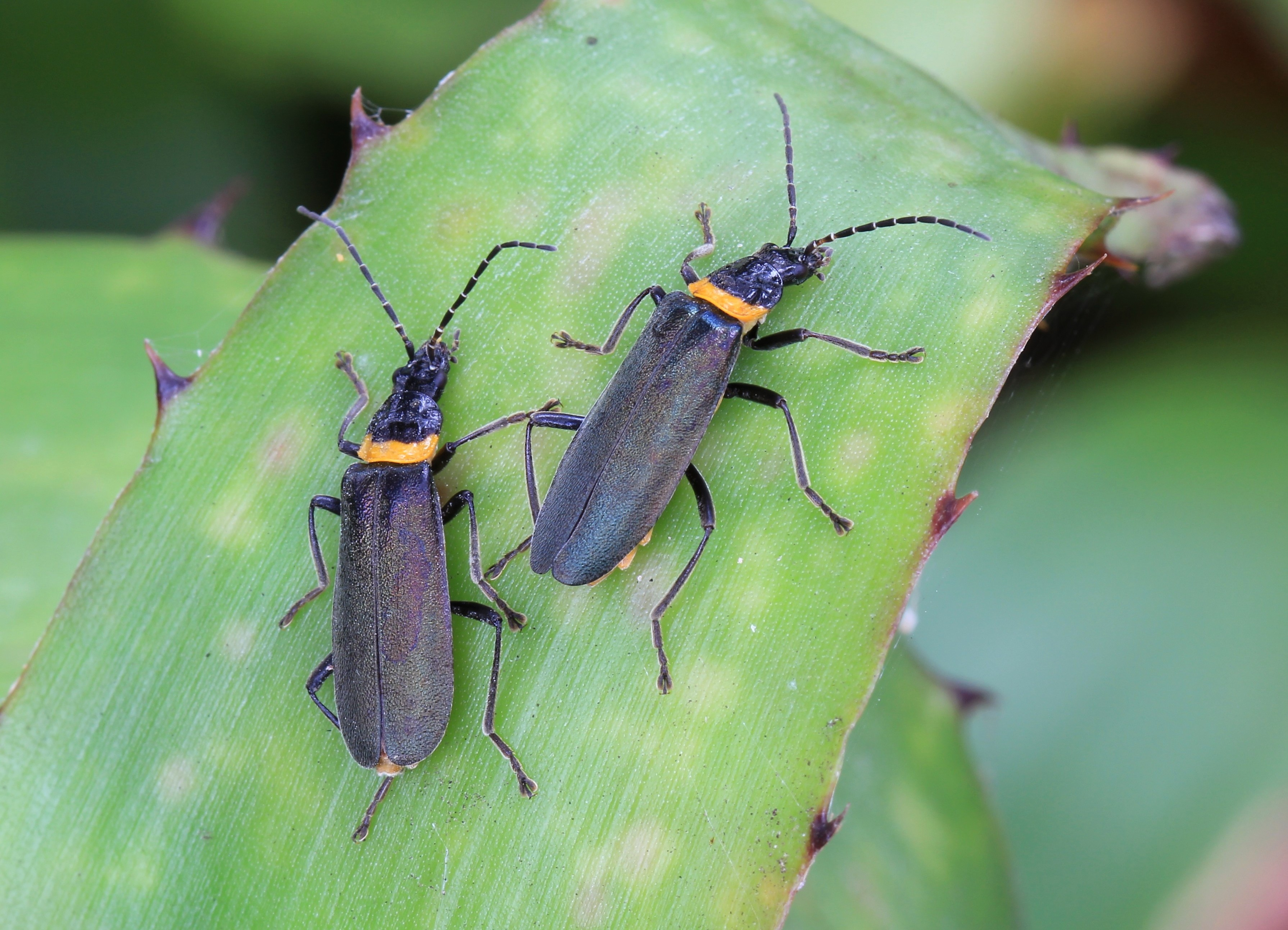
Plague soldier beetles in the Royal Botanic Gardens, Sydney, 2013

Chauliognathus lugubris, the plague soldier beetle, green soldier beetle or banana bug, is a species of soldier beetle (Cantharidae) native to Australia. It has a flattened body up to 15 millimetres (1 in) long, with a prominent yellow-orange stripe behind the black prothorax. The abdomen is yellow-orange but is mostly obscured by the metallic olive green elytra.

Plague soldier beetles are most common in spring and early summer, and have an adult lifespan of 2-3 months. They are most commonly found in the temperate region of south-east Australia, but are occasionally found in parts of the south-west of the continent.

The beetles often swarm in large, localised groups around flora such as shrubs and trees, primarily to mate and eat. The swarms can include hundreds of thousands of beetles.

As adults, plague soldier beetles are thought to feed on pollen and nectar. While in their larval stage, plague soldier beetles live in soil and are thought to feed on smaller, soft-shelled invertebrates.
