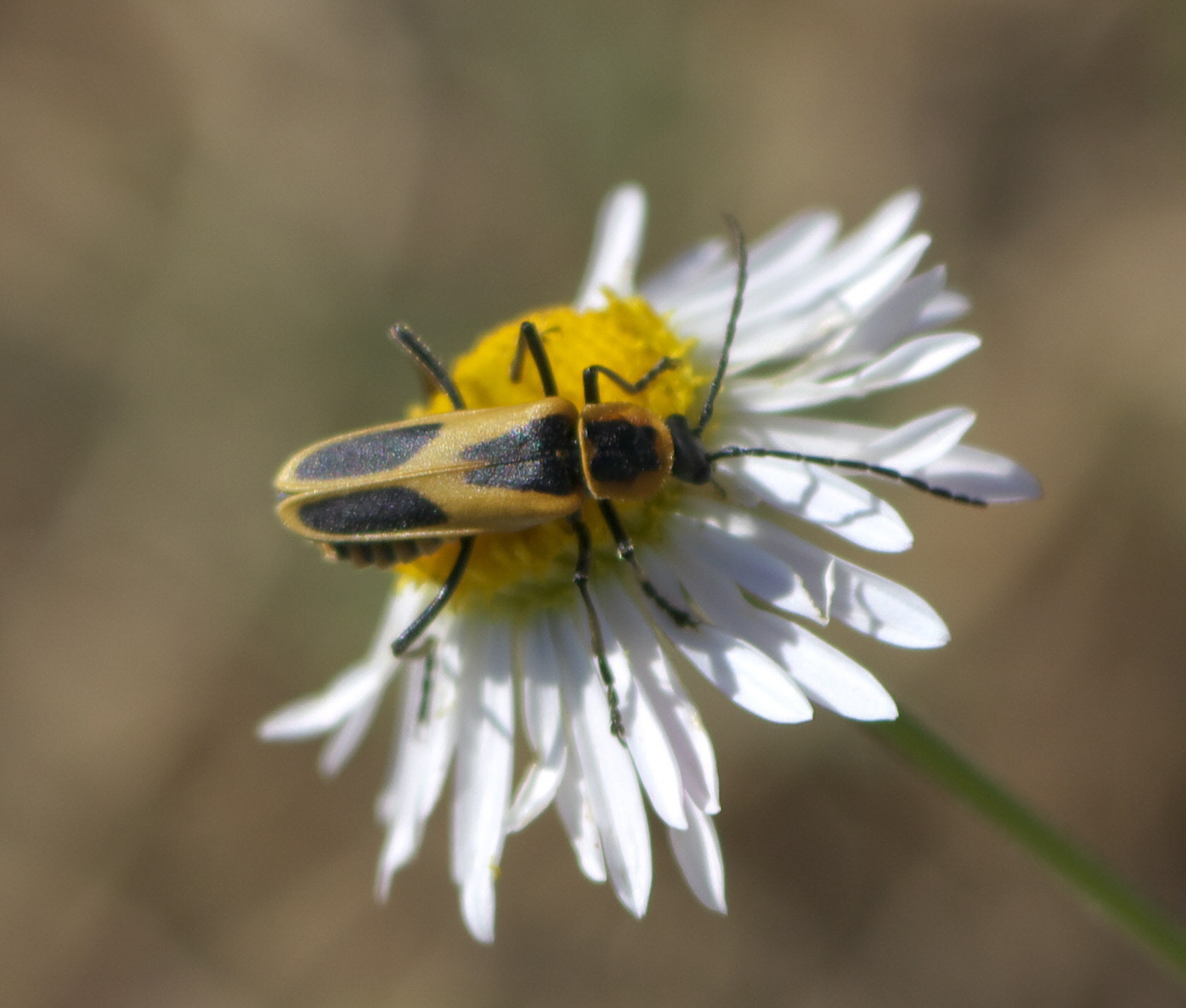

Scientific classification
- Domain: Eukaryota
- Kingdom: Animalia
- Phylum: Arthropoda
- Class: Insecta
- Order: Coleoptera
- Suborder: Polyphaga
- Infraorder: Elateriformia
- Family: Cantharidae
- Genus: Chauliognathus
- Species: C. scutellaris

Binomial name
- Chauliognathus scutellaris LeConte, 1853

= Chauliognathus scutellaris =

Species of beetle

Chauliognathus scutellaris, the Texas soldier beetle, is a species of soldier beetle in the family Cantharidae. It is found in Central America and North America.
