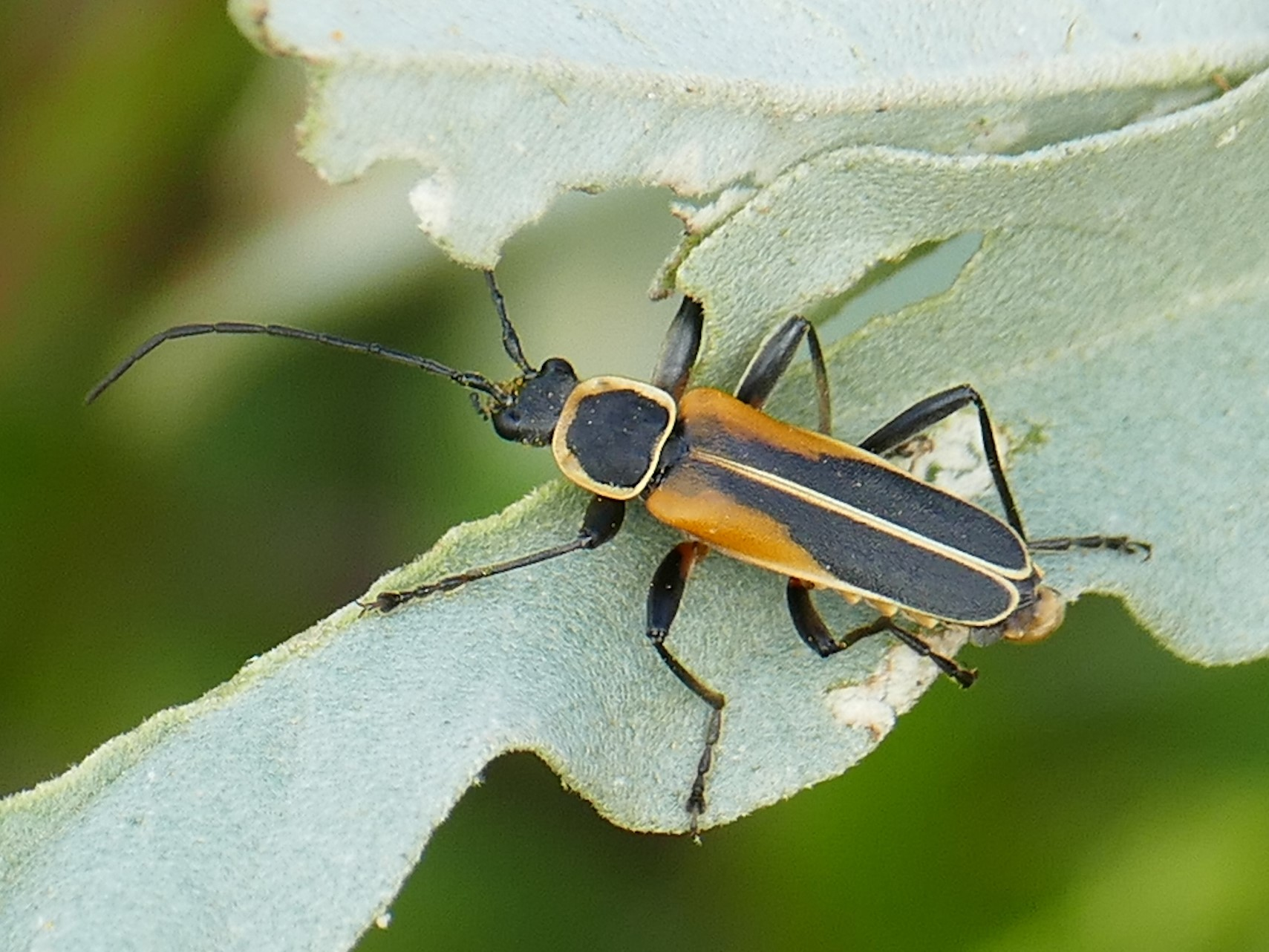

Scientific classification
- Domain: Eukaryota
- Kingdom: Animalia
- Phylum: Arthropoda
- Class: Insecta
- Order: Coleoptera
- Suborder: Polyphaga
- Infraorder: Elateriformia
- Family: Cantharidae
- Genus: Chauliognathus
- Species: C. opacus

Binomial name
- Chauliognathus opacus LeConte, 1866

= Chauliognathus opacus =

Species of beetle

Chauliognathus opacus is a species of soldier beetle in the family Cantharidae. It is found in North America.
