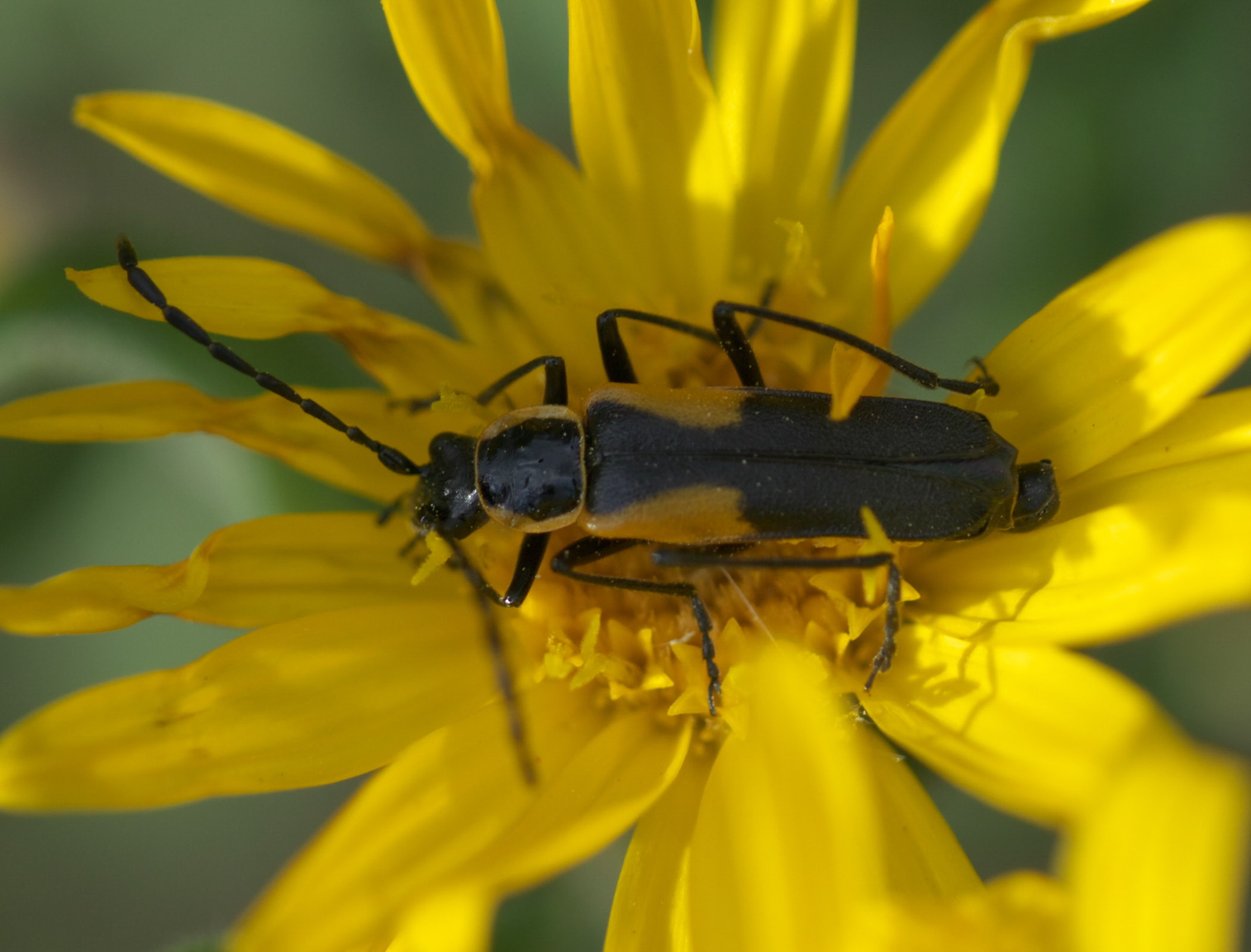

Scientific classification
- Kingdom: Animalia
- Phylum: Arthropoda
- Class: Insecta
- Order: Coleoptera
- Suborder: Polyphaga
- Infraorder: Elateriformia
- Family: Cantharidae
- Genus: Chauliognathus
- Species: C. deceptus

Binomial name
- Chauliognathus deceptus Fender, 1951

= Chauliognathus deceptus =

Species of beetle

Chauliognathus deceptus is a species of soldier beetle in the family Cantharidae. It is found in North America.
