= Trypherus latipennis =

Scientific classification
- Domain: Eukaryota
- Kingdom: Animalia
- Phylum: Arthropoda
- Class: Insecta
- Order: Coleoptera
- Suborder: Polyphaga
- Infraorder: Elateriformia
- Family: Cantharidae
- Genus: Trypherus
- Species: T. latipennis

Binomial name
- Trypherus latipennis (Germar, 1824)

Species of beetle

Trypherus latipennis is a species of soldier beetle in the family Cantharidae. It is found in North America.
