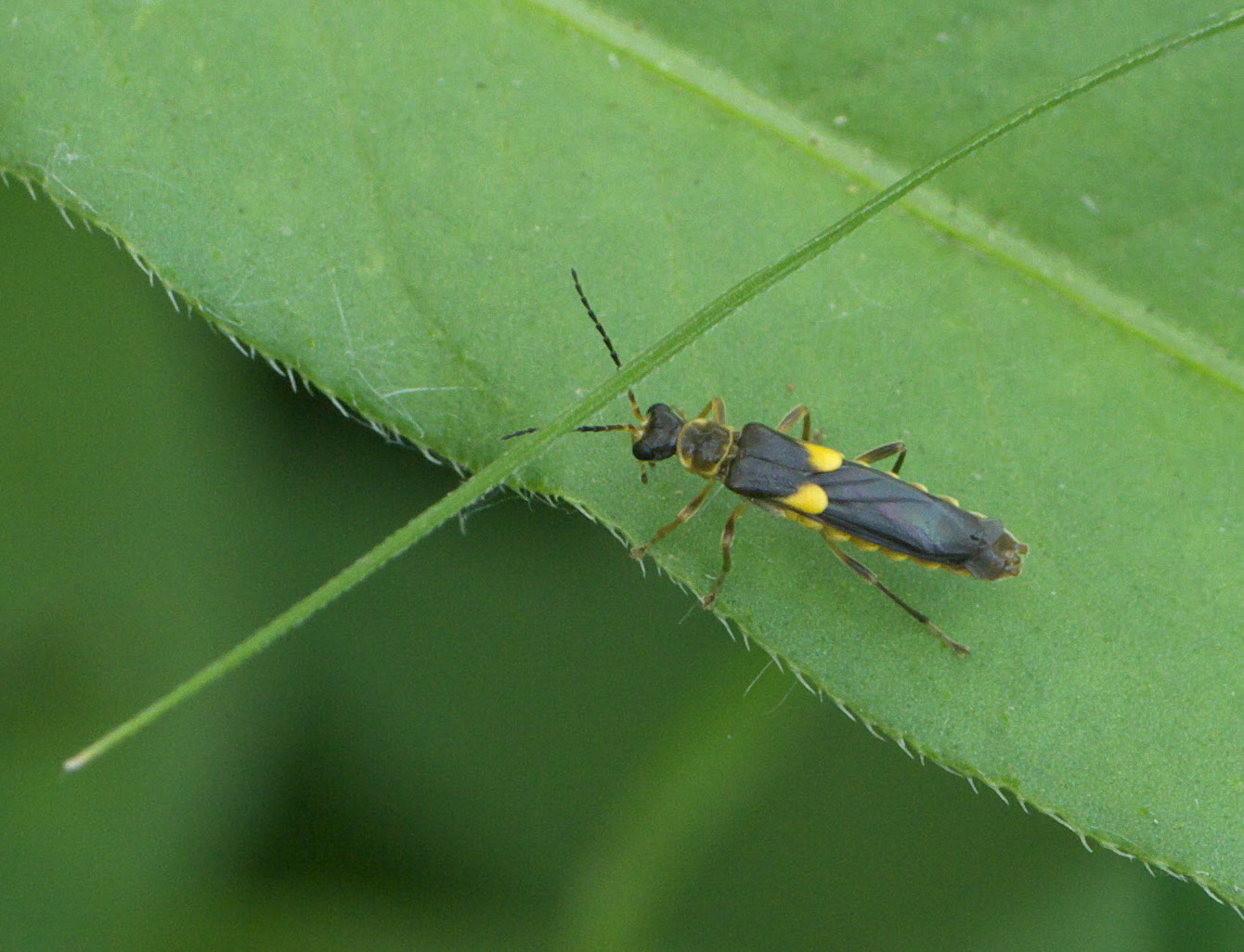
- Trypherus frisoni

Scientific classification
- Kingdom: Animalia
- Phylum: Arthropoda
- Class: Insecta
- Order: Coleoptera
- Suborder: Polyphaga
- Infraorder: Elateriformia
- Family: Cantharidae
- Subfamily: Chauliognathinae
- Genus: Trypherus; LeConte, 1851

= Trypherus =

Genus of beetles

Trypherus is a genus of soldier beetles in the family Cantharidae. There are at least 4 described species in Trypherus.

== Species ==
- Trypherus blaisdelli Fender, 1960
- Trypherus frisoni Fender, 1960
- Trypherus latipennis (Germar, 1824)
- Trypherus pauperculus Fender, 1960
