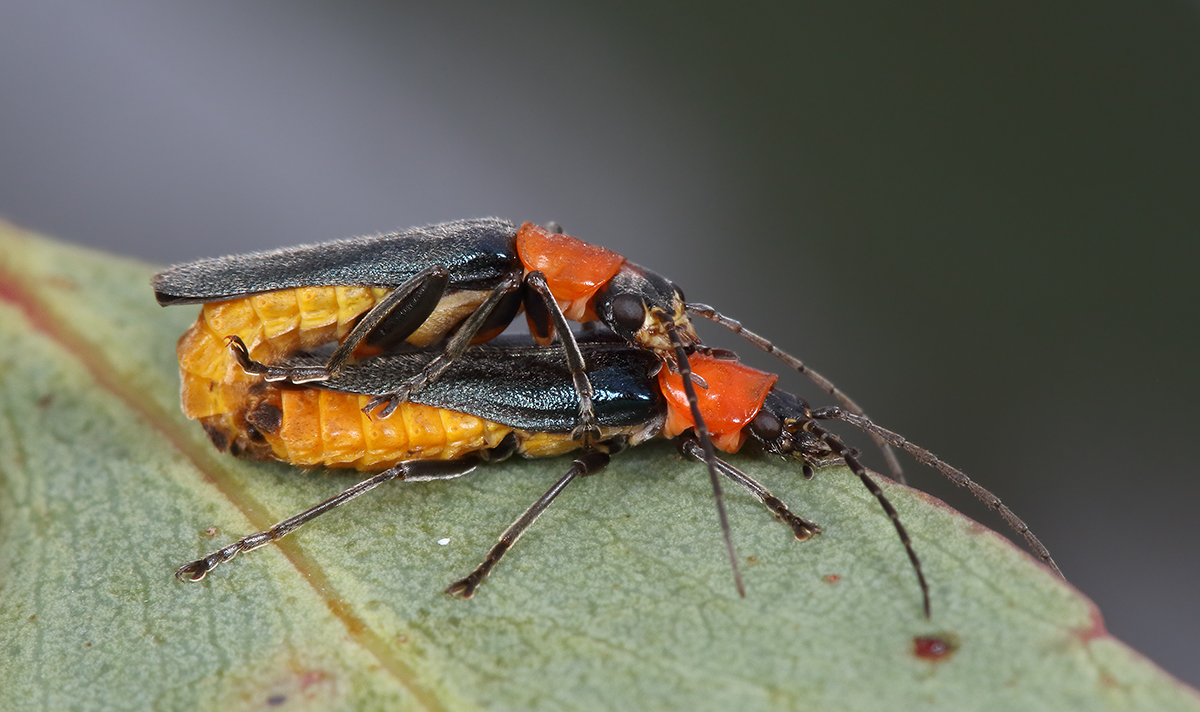

Scientific classification
- Domain: Eukaryota
- Kingdom: Animalia
- Phylum: Arthropoda
- Class: Insecta
- Order: Coleoptera
- Suborder: Polyphaga
- Infraorder: Elateriformia
- Family: Cantharidae
- Genus: Chauliognathus
- Species: C. tricolor

Binomial name
- Chauliognathus tricolor Castelnau, 1840

= Chauliognathus tricolor =

Species of beetle

Chauliognathus tricolor, the tricolor soldier beetle, is a species of soldier beetle in the family Cantharidae. It has a flattened body between 6 and 16 millimeters long with a prominent red-orange prothorax behind the black head. The abdomen is yellow-orange but is mostly obscured by the metallic olive green elytra.

== Distribution ==
It is found in Eastern Australia, South Australia and the southwest part of Western Australia.

== Gallery ==
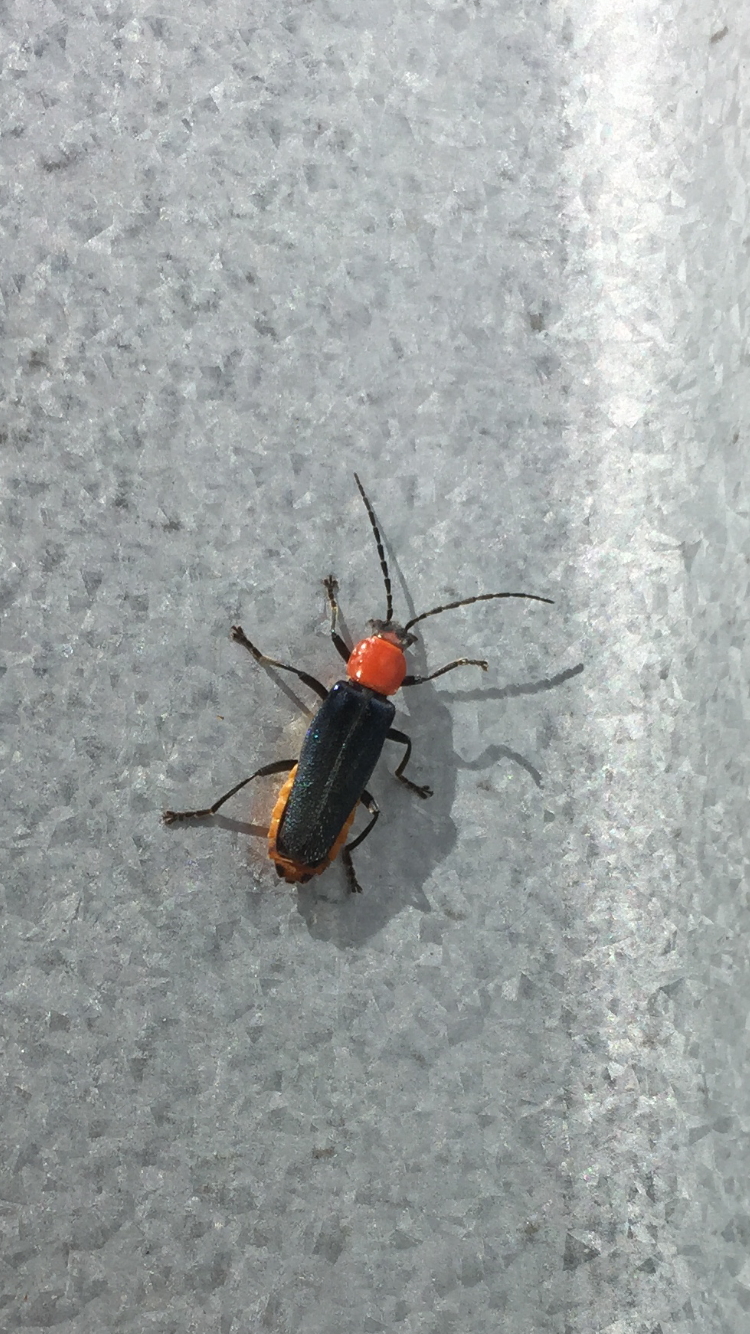
Chauliognathus tricolor

Chauliognathus tricolor
