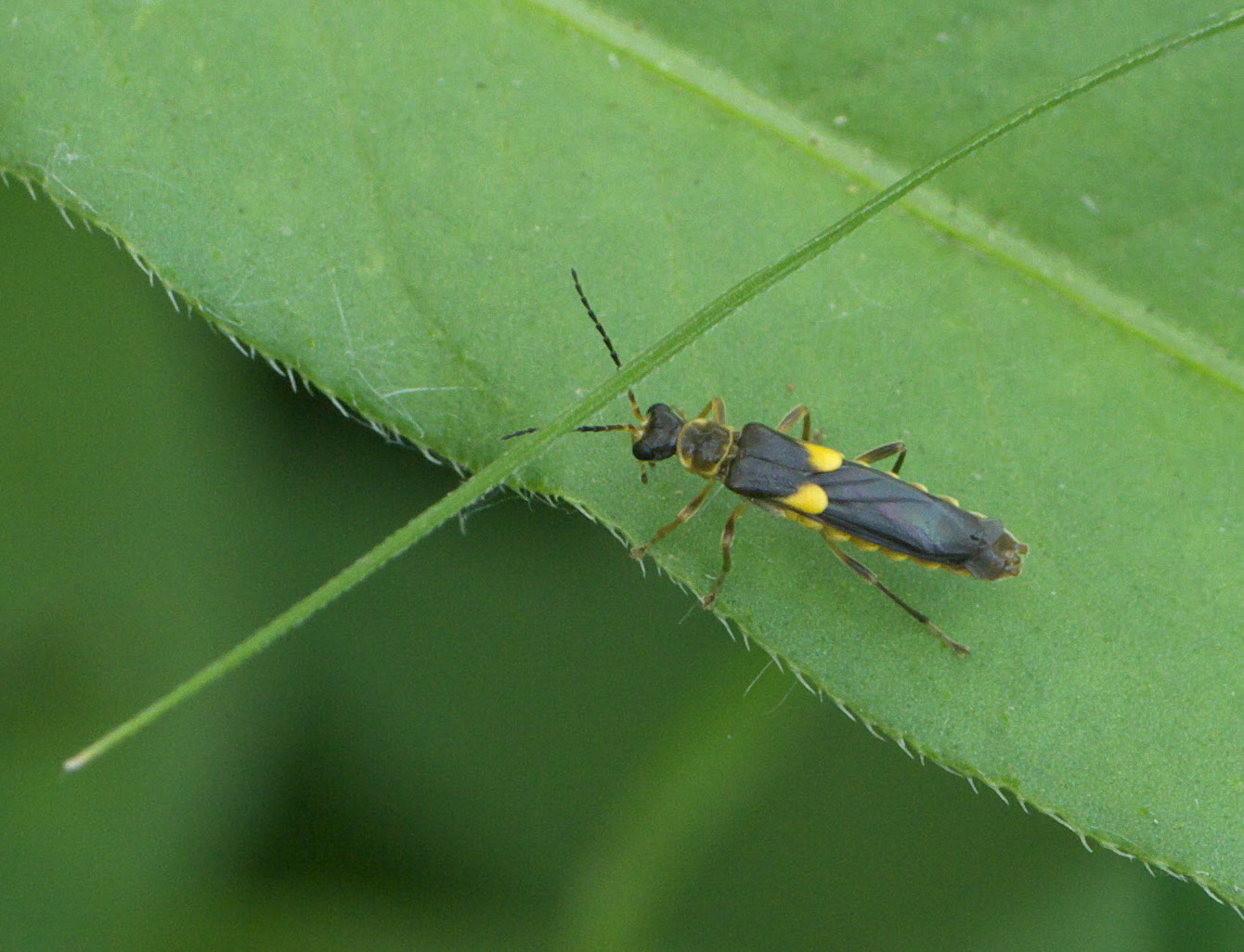

Scientific classification
- Kingdom: Animalia
- Phylum: Arthropoda
- Class: Insecta
- Order: Coleoptera
- Suborder: Polyphaga
- Infraorder: Elateriformia
- Family: Cantharidae
- Genus: Trypherus
- Species: T. frisoni

Binomial name
- Trypherus frisoni Fender, 1960

= Trypherus frisoni =

Species of beetle

Trypherus frisoni is a species of soldier beetles in the family Cantharidae. It is found in North America.
