= Chauliognathus discus =

Scientific classification
- Domain: Eukaryota
- Kingdom: Animalia
- Phylum: Arthropoda
- Class: Insecta
- Order: Coleoptera
- Suborder: Polyphaga
- Infraorder: Elateriformia
- Family: Cantharidae
- Genus: Chauliognathus
- Species: C. discus

Binomial name
- Chauliognathus discus LeConte, 1853

Species of beetle

Chauliognathus discus, the soldier beetle, is a species of soldier beetle in the family Cantharidae. It is found in North America.
