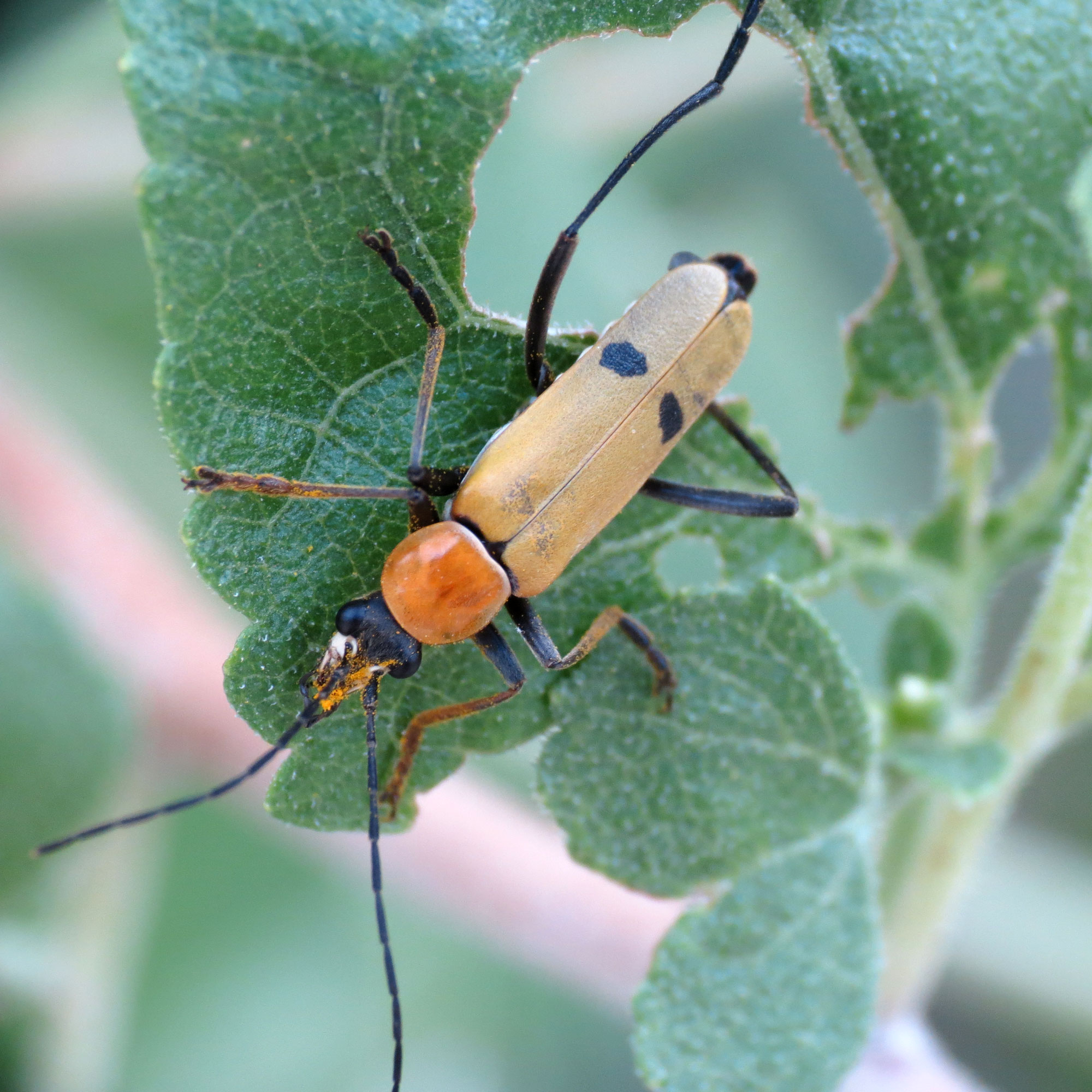

Scientific classification
- Domain: Eukaryota
- Kingdom: Animalia
- Phylum: Arthropoda
- Class: Insecta
- Order: Coleoptera
- Suborder: Polyphaga
- Infraorder: Elateriformia
- Family: Cantharidae
- Genus: Chauliognathus
- Species: C. misellus

Binomial name
- Chauliognathus misellus Horn, 1885

= Chauliognathus misellus =

Species of beetle

Chauliognathus misellus is a species of soldier beetle in the family Cantharidae. It is found in North America.
