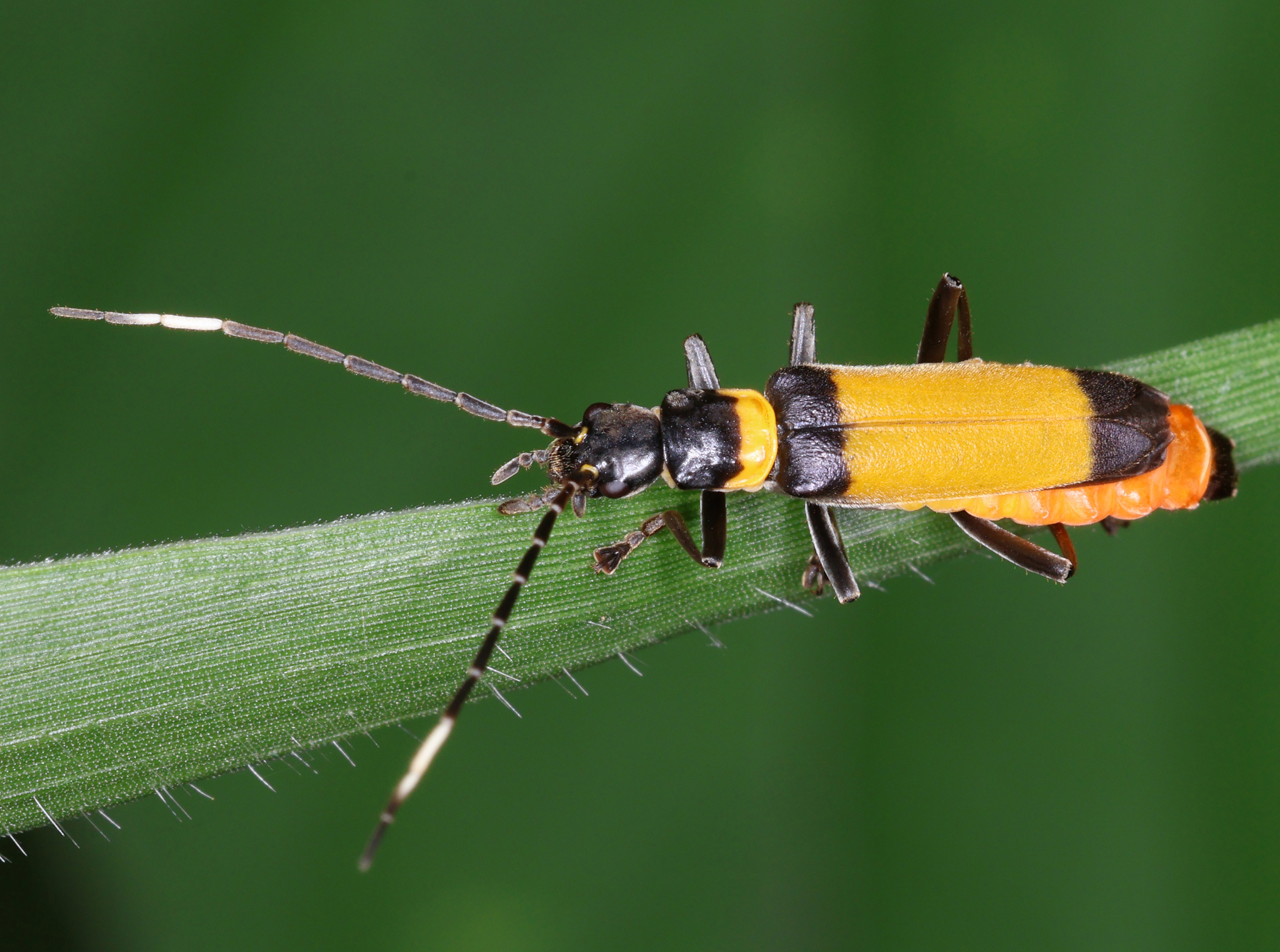
- Chauliognathus imperialis

Scientific classification
- Kingdom: Animalia
- Phylum: Arthropoda
- Class: Insecta
- Order: Coleoptera
- Suborder: Polyphaga
- Infraorder: Elateriformia
- Family: Cantharidae
- Subfamily: Chauliognathinae
- Tribe: Chauliognathini
- Genus: Chauliognathus; Hentz, 1830

= Chauliognathus =

Genus of beetles

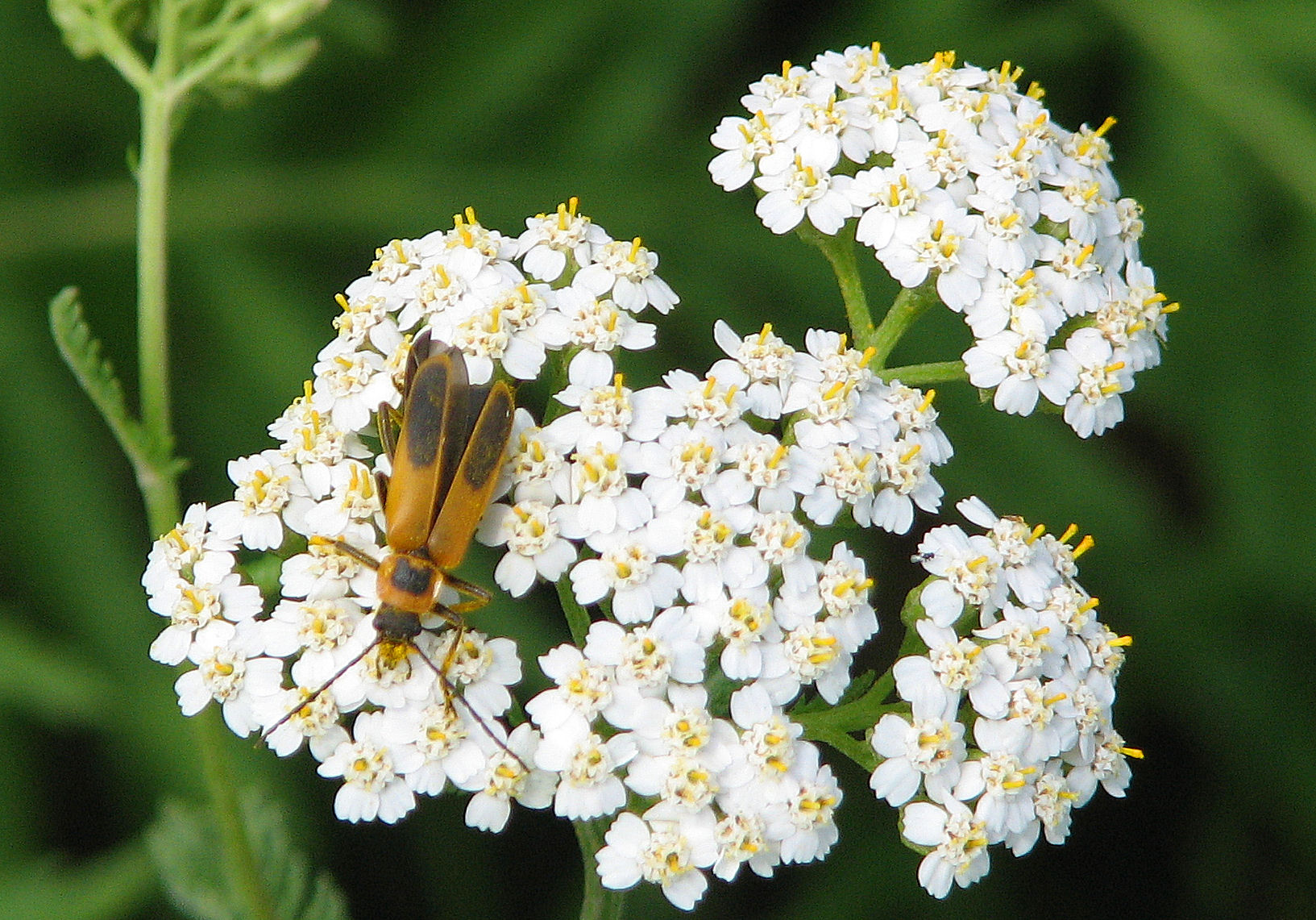
Goldenrod soldier beetle (C. pennsylvanicus)

Chauliognathus is a genus of soldier beetles in the family Cantharidae. Adults have almost rectangular bodies. Some are red and black, similar to the military uniforms that were common before the usage of camouflage, hence the name of soldier beetles. Others are orange and black. The elytra or first pair of wings are softer than the elytra of most beetles, that is why their other common name is leatherwings. The adults are frequently found on flowers, such as sunflowers, goldenrod, and coneflowers, where they mate and feed on pollen and nectar. The larvae are more common in the ground or among debris, where they feed on eggs or larvae of other insects. The adults are most frequently found in summer and early fall. They are native to America and Australia.

== Species ==
- Chauliognathus arizonensis Fender, 1964
- Chauliognathus basalis LeConte, 1859 – Colorado soldier beetle
- Chauliognathus deceptus Fender, 1964
- Chauliognathus discus LeConte, 1853
- Chauliognathus expansus
- Chauliognathus fallax
- Chauliognathus fasciatus LeConte, 1881
- Chauliognathus fenestratus (Perty, 1830)
- Chauliognathus flavipes
- Chauliognathus imperialis (Redtenbacher, 1867)
- Chauliognathus ineptus Horn, 1885
- Chauliognathus lecontei Champion, 1914
- Chauliognathus lewisi Crotch, 1874
- Chauliognathus limbicollis LeConte, 1858
- Chauliognathus lineatus
- Chauliognathus lugubris Fabricius, 1801 – plague soldier beetle or green soldier beetle
- Chauliognathus marginatus (Fabricius, 1775) – margined leatherwing
- Chauliognathus misellus Horn, 1885
- Chauliognathus morios
- Chauliognathus obscurus Schaeffer, 1909
- Chauliognathus octamaculatus
- Chauliognathus omissus Fall, 1930
- Chauliognathus opacus LeConte 1866
- Chauliognathus pensylvanicus (De Geer, 1774) – goldenrod soldier beetle or Pennsylvania leatherwing
- Chauliognathus profundus LeConte, 1858
- Chauliognathus opacus LeConte, 1866
- Chauliognathus riograndensis
- Chauliognathus scutellaris LeConte, 1858
- Chauliognathus tetrapunctatus
- Chauliognathus transversus Fender, 1964
- Chauliognathus tricolor Castelnau, 1840
- Chauliognathus werneri Fender, 1964
