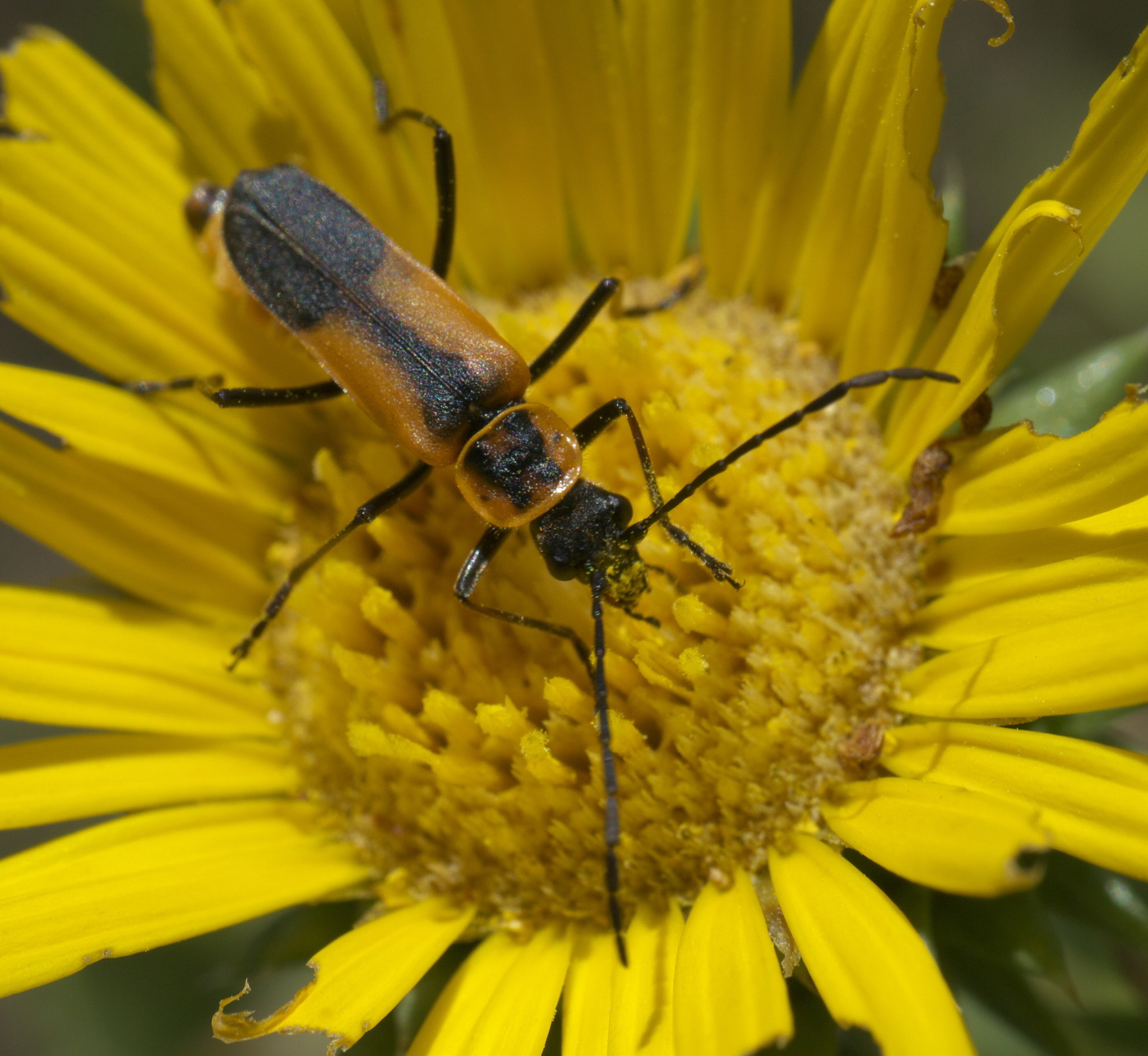
- Chauliognathus limbicollis, Oklahoma

Scientific classification
- Domain: Eukaryota
- Kingdom: Animalia
- Phylum: Arthropoda
- Class: Insecta
- Order: Coleoptera
- Suborder: Polyphaga
- Infraorder: Elateriformia
- Family: Cantharidae
- Genus: Chauliognathus
- Species: C. limbicollis

Binomial name
- Chauliognathus limbicollis LeConte, 1858

= Chauliognathus limbicollis =

Species of beetle

Chauliognathus limbicollis is a species of soldier beetle in the family Cantharidae. It is found in North and Central America.
