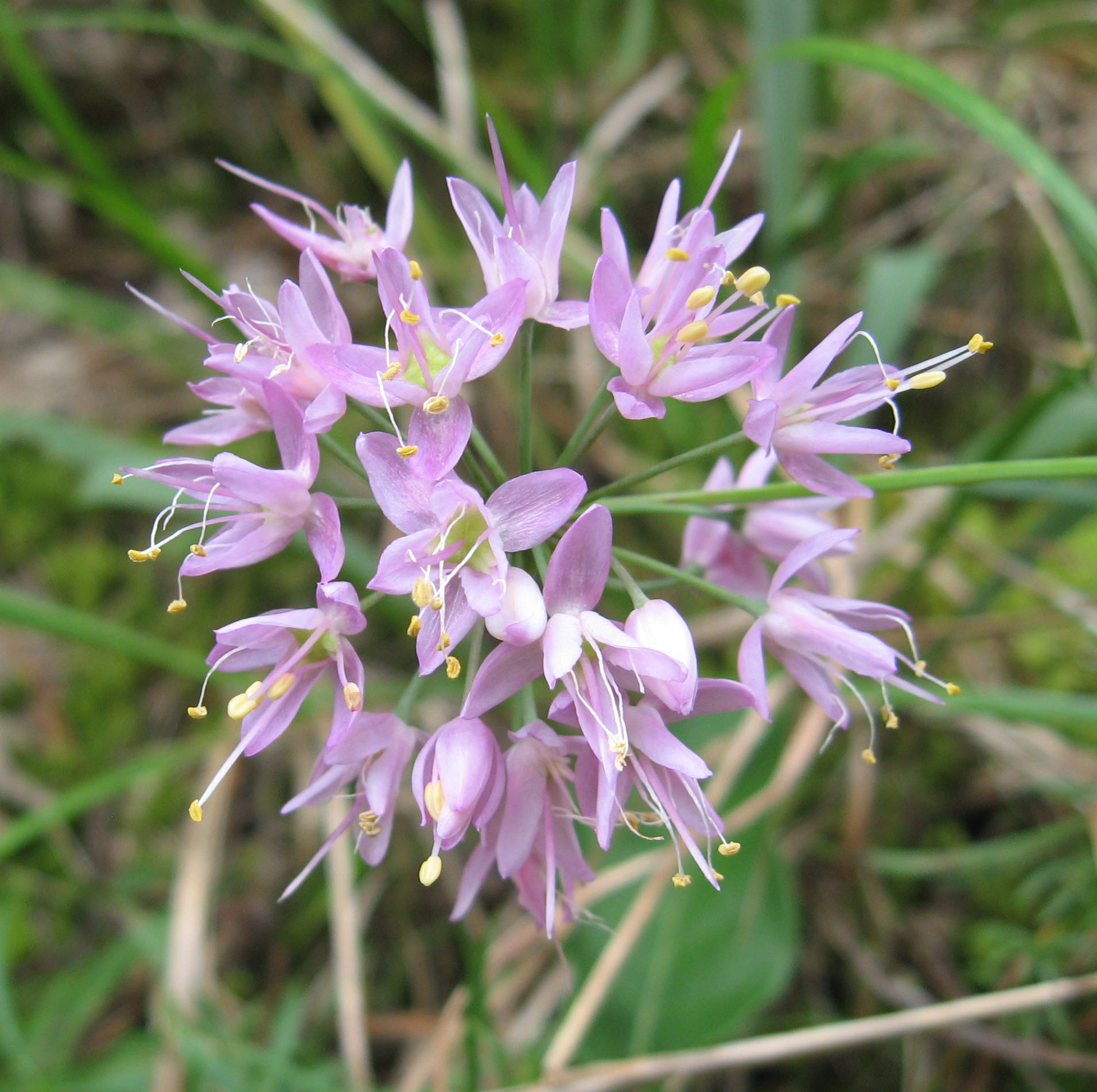

Conservation status
- Secure (NatureServe)

Scientific classification
- Kingdom: Plantae
- Clade: Tracheophytes
- Clade: Angiosperms
- Clade: Monocots
- Order: Asparagales
- Family: Amaryllidaceae
- Subfamily: Allioideae
- Genus: Allium
- Subgenus: A. subg. Amerallium
- Species: A. stellatum

Binomial name
- Allium stellatum Nutt. ex Ker Gawl.

Synonyms
- Stelmesus stellatus (Nutt. ex Ker Gawl.) Raf.; Hexonychia stellatum (Nutt. ex Ker Gawl.) Salisb.

= Allium stellatum =

Species of flowering plant

Allium stellatum, commonly known as the autumn onion, prairie onion, cliff onion, or glade onion, is a North American species of wild onion in the Amaryllidaceae family that is native to central Canada and the central United States.

== Description ==
Allium stellatum is a perennial forming a bulb underground. An erect, leafless scape up to 30–60 centimetres (1–2 ft) tall arises from grass-like basal leaves that are up to 30 centimetres (1 ft) long. The leaves die back as the rounded umbel of pink to purple flowers forms at the end of the scape in the summer. The umbel is approximately 5–8 centimetres (2–3 in) across, and each of the tiny flowers is slightly longer than 0.6 centimetres (.25 in), with 3 petals and 3 sepals that flare outward. The bulbs are strongly flavored but edible.

== Etymology ==
The genus name Allium is from the classical Latin name for garlic. The species name stellatum is botanical Latin for "starry", and refers to the umbels. This species was described for science by John Bellenden Ker Gawler in 1813.

== Distribution and habitat ==
The plant ranges from Ontario and Saskatchewan south to Tennessee and Texas. Allium stellatum grows in rocky, sandy soil.

== Ecology ==
A. stellatum attracts small bees and flies to its foliage. It probably is not eaten by native mammals because of its strong scent and taste.

1913 illustration.
