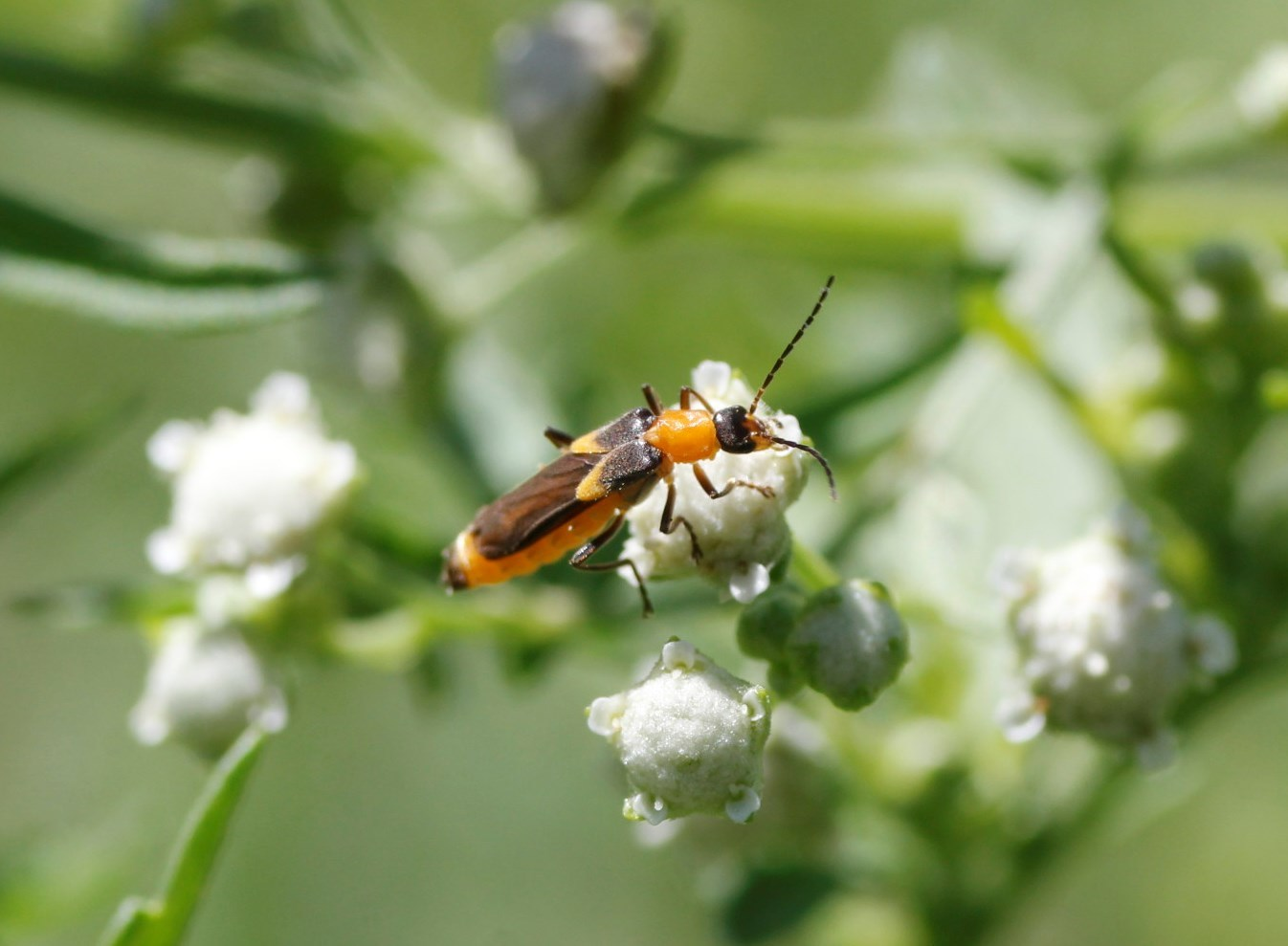
- Belotus abdominalis

Scientific classification
- Kingdom: Animalia
- Phylum: Arthropoda
- Class: Insecta
- Order: Coleoptera
- Suborder: Polyphaga
- Infraorder: Elateriformia
- Family: Cantharidae
- Tribe: Chauliognathini
- Genus: Belotus; Gorham, 1881

= Belotus =

Genus of beetles

Belotus is a genus of soldier beetles in the family Cantharidae. There are at least four described species in Belotus.

== Species ==
These four species belong to the genus Belotus:

- Belotus abdominalis LeConte, 1851
- Belotus antillarum Leng & Mutchler
- Belotus bicolor Brancucci, 1979
- Belotus minutus Leng & Mutchler
