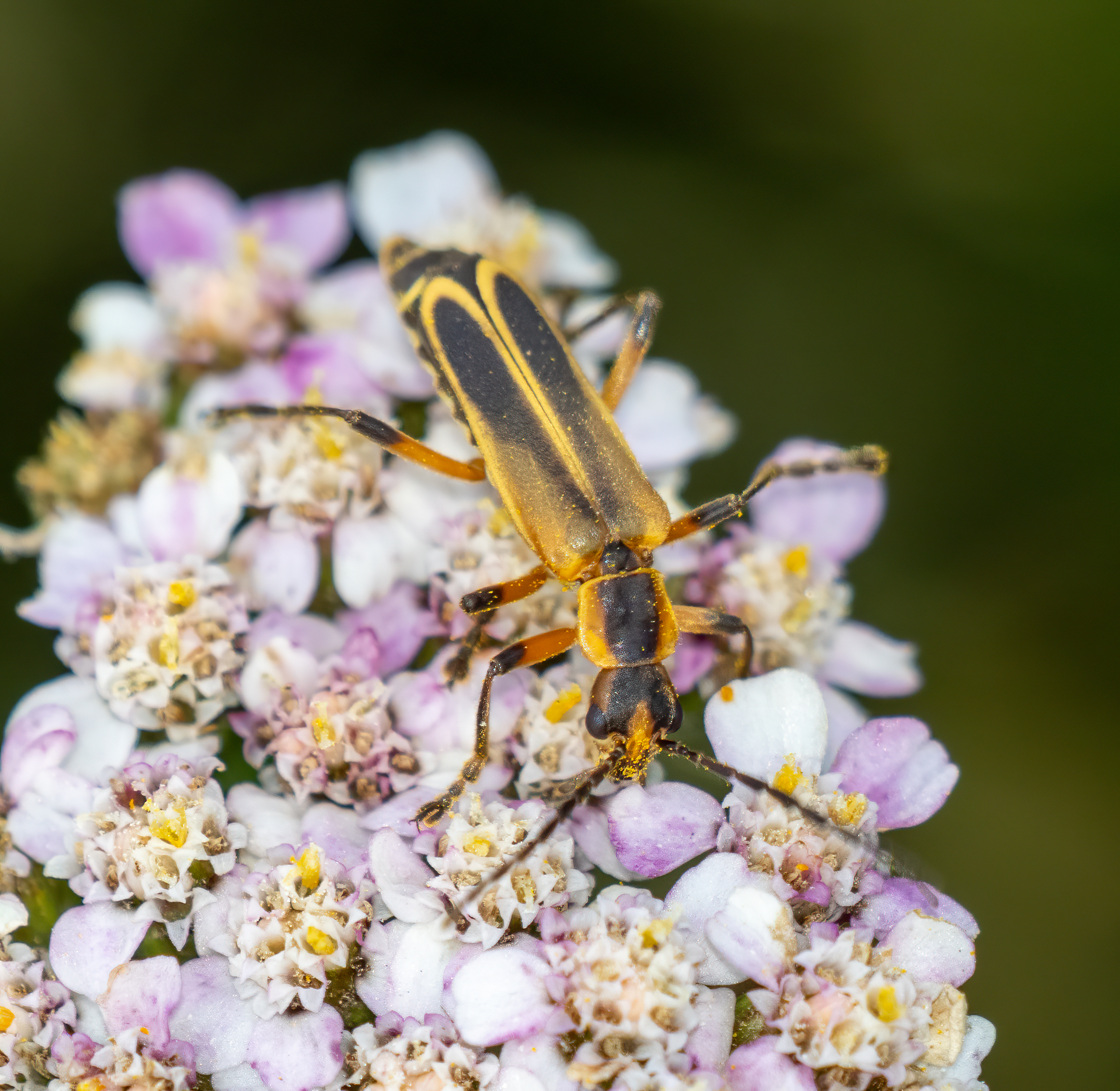

Scientific classification
- Domain: Eukaryota
- Kingdom: Animalia
- Phylum: Arthropoda
- Class: Insecta
- Order: Coleoptera
- Suborder: Polyphaga
- Infraorder: Elateriformia
- Family: Cantharidae
- Genus: Chauliognathus
- Species: C. marginatus

Binomial name
- Chauliognathus marginatus (Fabricius, 1775)

= Chauliognathus marginatus =

Species of beetle

Chauliognathus marginatus, known generally as the margined leatherwing or margined soldier beetle, is a species of soldier beetle in the family Cantharidae. It is found in Central America and North America. It is most commonly found on white flowers in spring and early summer.
