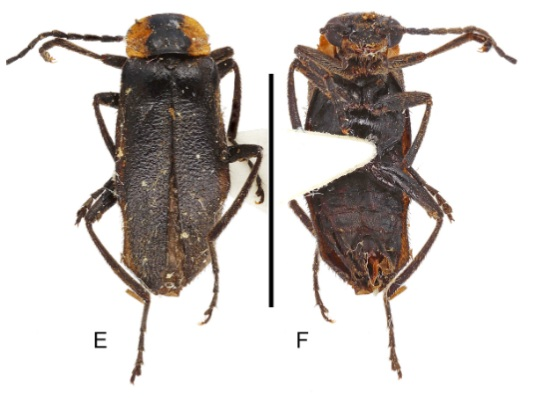

Scientific classification
- Kingdom: Animalia
- Phylum: Arthropoda
- Class: Insecta
- Order: Coleoptera
- Suborder: Polyphaga
- Infraorder: Elateriformia
- Family: Cantharidae
- Genus: Discodon
- Species: D. nigrocephalum

Binomial name
- Discodon nigrocephalum Pic, 1949

= Discodon nigrocephalum =

Species of beetle

Discodon nigrocephalum is a species of beetle of the family Cantharidae. This species is found in Brazil (São Paulo).

== Description ==
Adults are similar to Discodon obscurior and Discodon tenuecostatum by the general coloration. D. nigrocephalum differs from these species by the wider head, apparently nearly as wide as the pronotum, the black antennae, and the coriaceous, rough elytra, without costulae.
