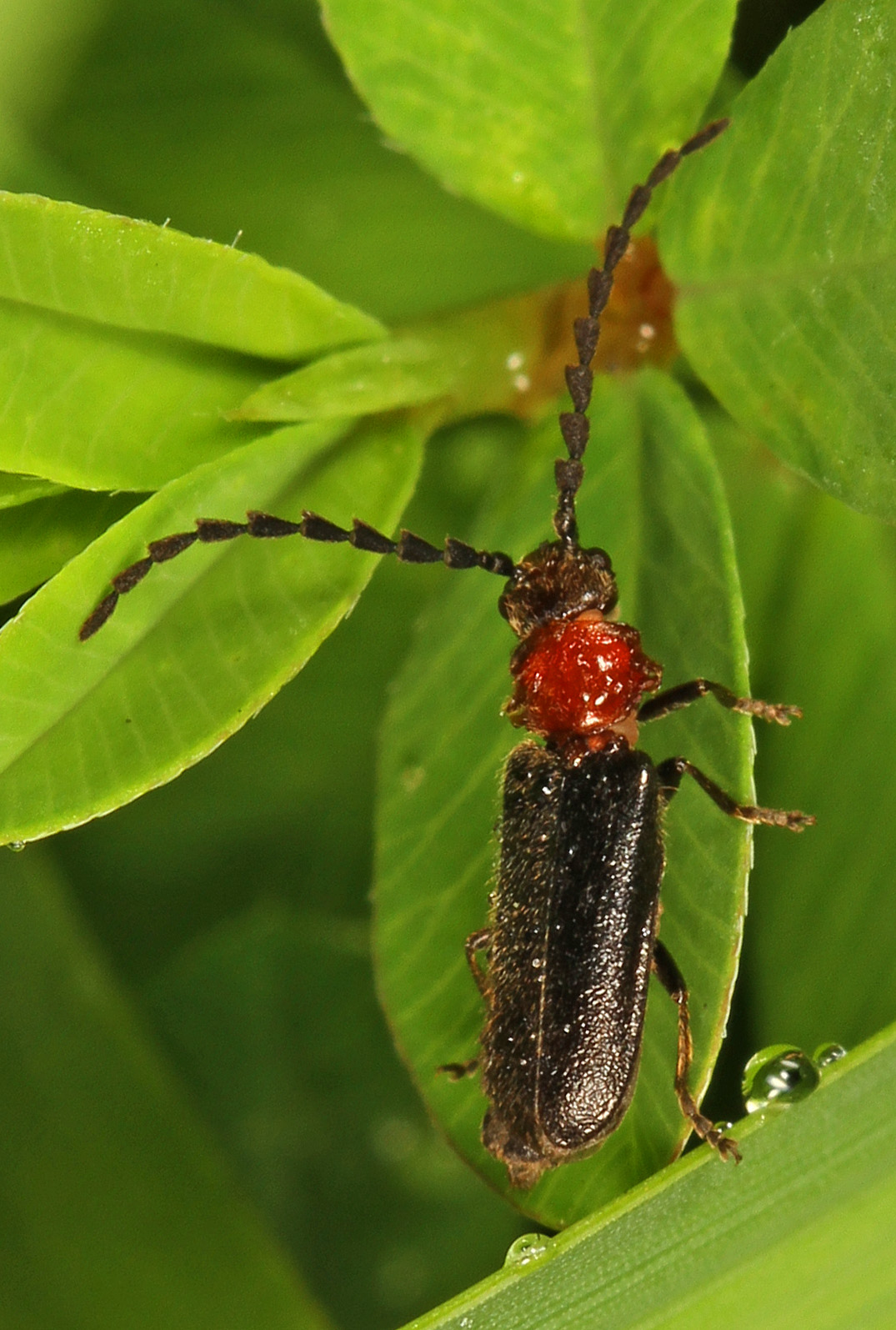
- Ditemnus bidentatus

Scientific classification
- Domain: Eukaryota
- Kingdom: Animalia
- Phylum: Arthropoda
- Class: Insecta
- Order: Coleoptera
- Suborder: Polyphaga
- Infraorder: Elateriformia
- Family: Cantharidae
- Subfamily: Silinae; Mulsant, 1862

= Silinae =

Subfamily of beetles

Silinae is a subfamily of soldier beetles in the family Cantharidae. There are about 6 genera and more than 180 described species in Silinae.

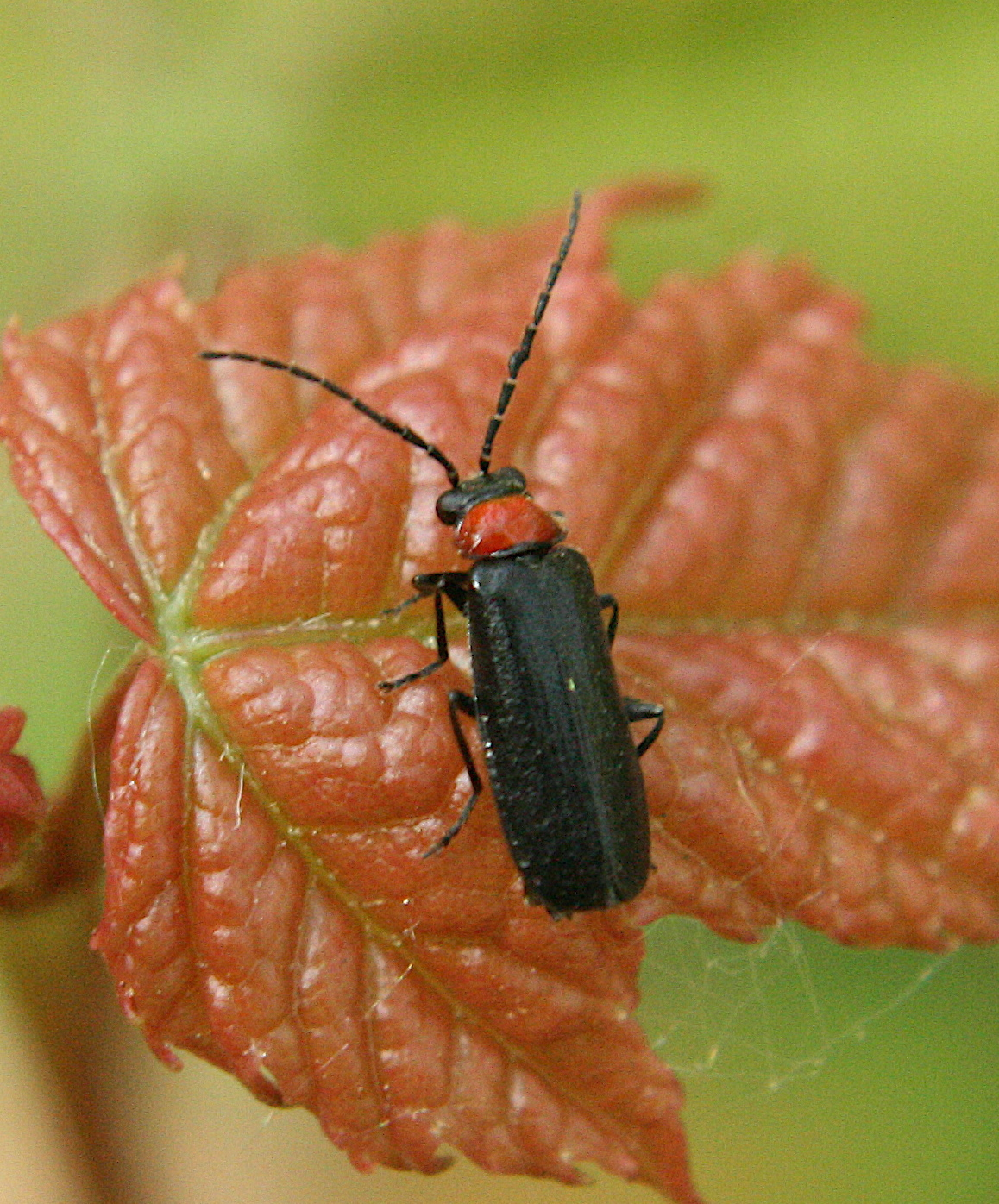
Silis percomis

== Genera ==
These six genera belong to the subfamily Silinae:

- Discodon Gorham, 1881
- Ditemnus LeConte, 1861
- Plectonotum Gorham, 1891
- Polemius LeConte, 1851
- Silis Charpentier, 1825
- Tytthonyx LeConte, 1851
