= Weston Fen =

Weston Fen can refer to

- Weston Fen, Oxfordshire
- Weston Fen, Suffolk
