= Tytthonyx bicolor =

Scientific classification
- Kingdom: Animalia
- Phylum: Arthropoda
- Class: Insecta
- Order: Coleoptera
- Suborder: Polyphaga
- Infraorder: Elateriformia
- Family: Cantharidae
- Genus: Tytthonyx
- Species: T. bicolor

Binomial name
- Tytthonyx bicolor LeConte, 1885

Species of beetle

Tytthonyx bicolor is a species of soldier beetle in the family Cantharidae. It is found in North America.
