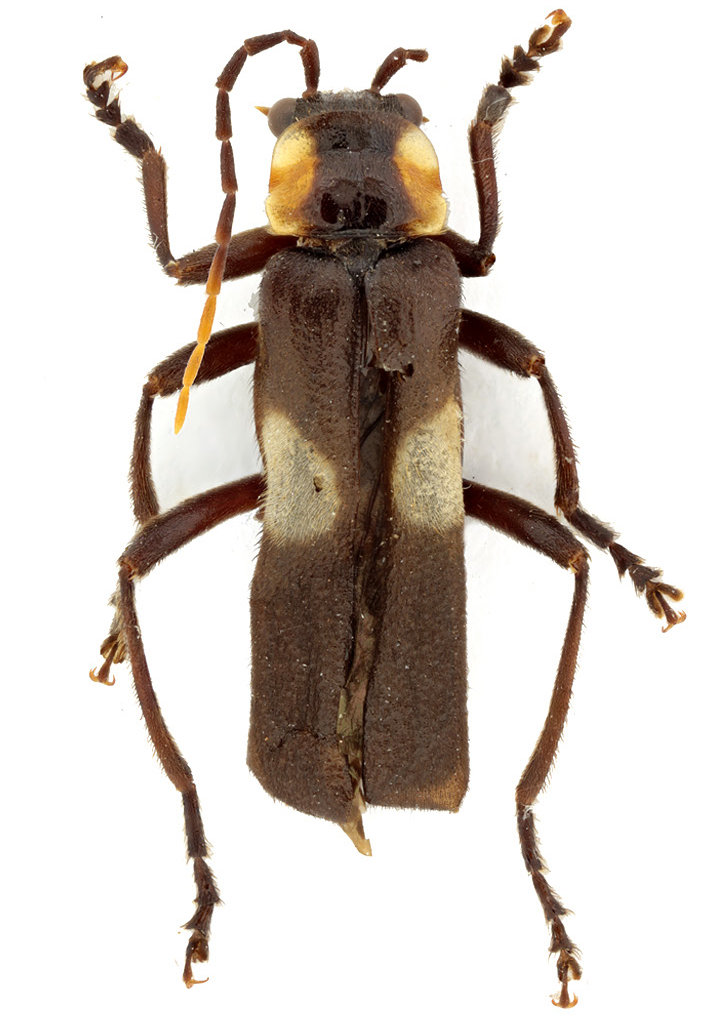

Scientific classification
- Kingdom: Animalia
- Phylum: Arthropoda
- Class: Insecta
- Order: Coleoptera
- Suborder: Polyphaga
- Infraorder: Elateriformia
- Family: Cantharidae
- Genus: Discodon
- Species: D. viridimontanum

Binomial name
- Discodon viridimontanum Biffi & Geiser, 2022

= Discodon viridimontanum =

Species of beetle

Discodon viridimontanum is a species of beetle of the family Cantharidae. This species is found in Brazil (Minas Gerais).

== Description ==
Adults reach a length of about 10.4 mm. They have a pitch black head. The pronotum is lustrous, partly translucent, with a broad irregular black band from the anterior to the posterior margin, wider anteriorly and near the posterior margin, and narrower near the anterior half. The background is pale yellow with barely diffuse orange patches. The scutellum and elytra pitch black, slightly lustrous; at mid-length of each elytron, rounded whitish spot nearly reaching lateral borders but not meeting at suture. Thorax, legs and abdomen dark brown to black.

== Etymology ==
The epithet refers to the type locality of the species, Monte Verde (Minas Gerais state, Brazil), which translates to green hill from Portuguese.
