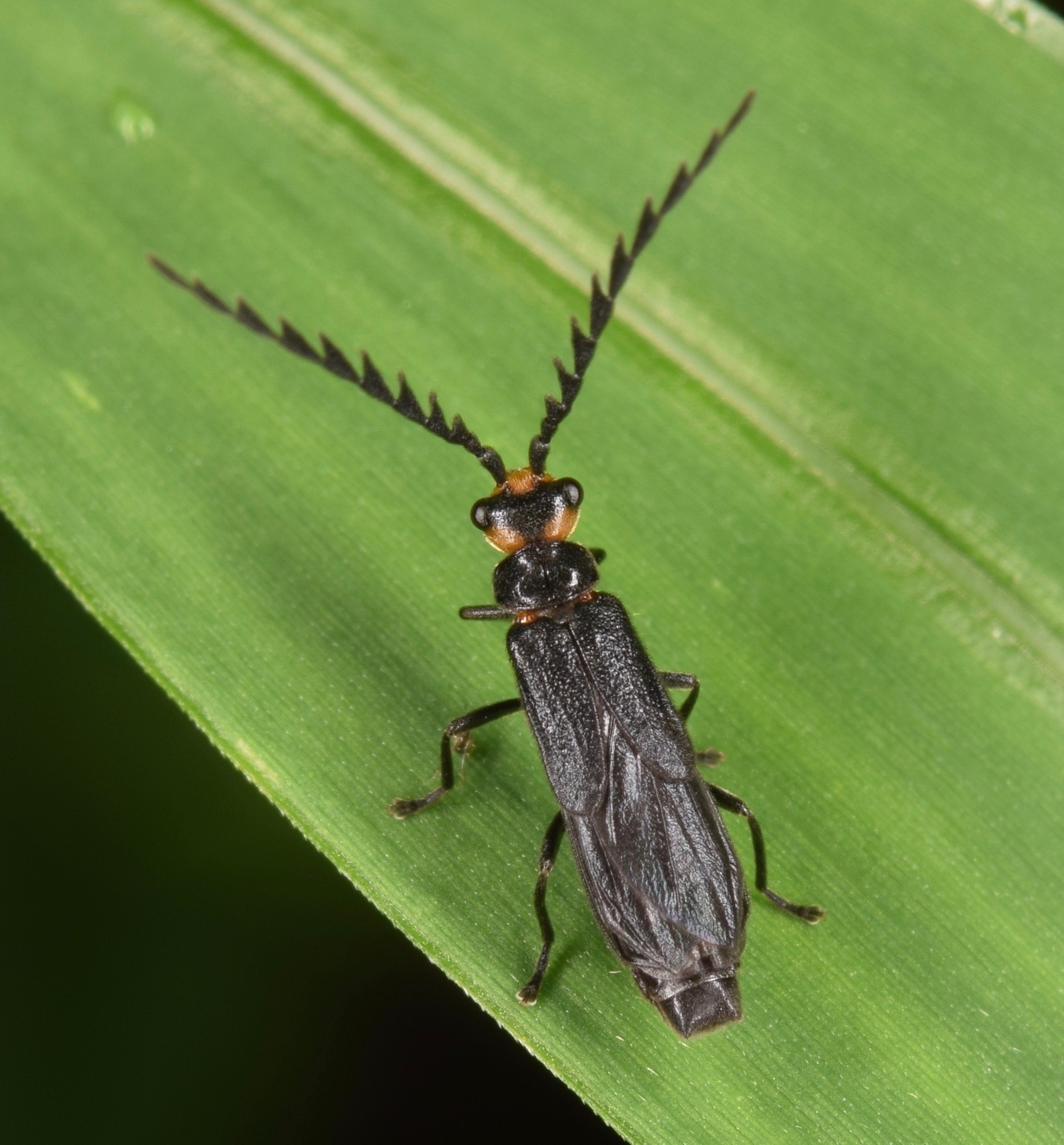
- Tytthonyx erythrocephala

Scientific classification
- Kingdom: Animalia
- Phylum: Arthropoda
- Class: Insecta
- Order: Coleoptera
- Suborder: Polyphaga
- Infraorder: Elateriformia
- Superfamily: Elateroidea
- Family: Cantharidae
- Subfamily: Silinae
- Genus: Tytthonyx; LeConte, 1851

= Tytthonyx =

Genus of beetles

Tytthonyx is a genus of soldier beetles in the family Cantharidae. There are about 19 described species in Tytthonyx.

== Species ==
These 19 species belong to the genus Tytthonyx:

- Tytthonyx bicolor LeConte, 1885
- Tytthonyx cubanus Leng & Mutchler
- Tytthonyx dierkensi Constantin, 2012
- Tytthonyx erythrocephala
- Tytthonyx erythrocephalus (Fabricius, 1801)
- Tytthonyx flavicollis Blatchley, 1920
- Tytthonyx furtivus Blatchley, 1924
- Tytthonyx geiseri (Poinar & Fanti, 2016)
- Tytthonyx guadeloupensis (Fleutiaux & Sallé, 1889)
- Tytthonyx guanaensis Wittmer
- Tytthonyx hintoni Delkeskamp, 1977-01
- Tytthonyx insularis Wittmer
- Tytthonyx martiniquensis Constantin, 2012
- Tytthonyx oaxacaensis Zaragoza-Caballero, 2001
- Tytthonyx perezi Zaragoza-Caballero, 2001
- Tytthonyx puertoricanus Wittmer
- Tytthonyx ruficollis Schaeffer, 1904
- Tytthonyx rufiventris
- Tytthonyx virginensis Wittmer
