= Silis pallida =

Scientific classification
- Kingdom: Animalia
- Phylum: Arthropoda
- Class: Insecta
- Order: Coleoptera
- Suborder: Polyphaga
- Infraorder: Elateriformia
- Family: Cantharidae
- Genus: Silis
- Species: S. pallida

Binomial name
- Silis pallida Mannerheim, 1843

Species of beetle

Silis pallida is a species of soldier beetle in the family Cantharidae. It is found in North America.
