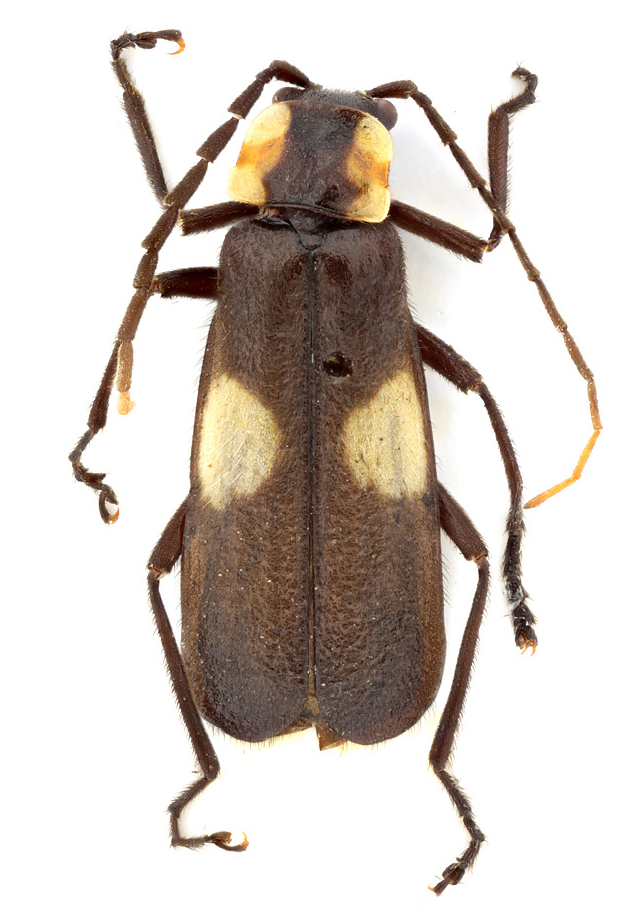

Scientific classification
- Kingdom: Animalia
- Phylum: Arthropoda
- Class: Insecta
- Order: Coleoptera
- Suborder: Polyphaga
- Infraorder: Elateriformia
- Family: Cantharidae
- Genus: Discodon
- Species: D. vanini

Binomial name
- Discodon vanini Biffi & Geiser, 2022

= Discodon vanini =

Species of beetle

Discodon vanini is a species of beetle of the family Cantharidae. This species is found in Brazil (Minas Gerais, São Paulo, Paraná).

== Description ==
Adults reach a length of about 9.7–13 mm. They have a pitch black head. The pronotum is lustrous, translucent, with a broad irregular black band from the anterior to the posterior margin, wider posteriorly and narrower near middle. The background is bright yellow to light orange with well-defined diagonal orange and brown patches laterally. The scutellum and elytra are pitch black, slightly lustrous. There is a large whitish to pale yellow round spot at mid-length of each elytron, nearly reaching the lateral borders but not meeting at the suture. The thorax, legs and abdomen are pitch black.

== Etymology ==
The species is named in honour of the late Professor Sergio A. Vanin (1948–2020) in appreciation of his enormous and enduring contribution in the study and teaching of zoology, especially Coleoptera systematics.
