= Discodon abdominale =

Scientific classification
- Domain: Eukaryota
- Kingdom: Animalia
- Phylum: Arthropoda
- Class: Insecta
- Order: Coleoptera
- Suborder: Polyphaga
- Infraorder: Elateriformia
- Family: Cantharidae
- Genus: Discodon
- Species: D. abdominale

Binomial name
- Discodon abdominale Schaeffer, 1909

Species of beetle

Discodon abdominale is a species of soldier beetle in the family Cantharidae. It is found in North America.
