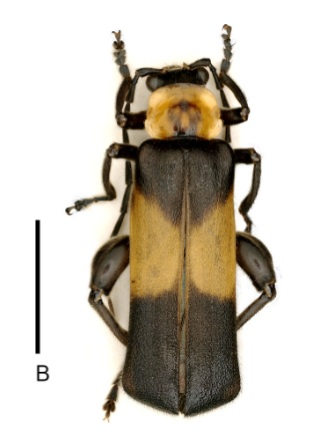

Scientific classification
- Kingdom: Animalia
- Phylum: Arthropoda
- Class: Insecta
- Order: Coleoptera
- Suborder: Polyphaga
- Infraorder: Elateriformia
- Family: Cantharidae
- Genus: Discodon
- Species: D. crassipes

Binomial name
- Discodon crassipes Wittmer, 1952

= Discodon crassipes =

Species of beetle

Discodon crassipes is a species of beetle of the family Cantharidae. This species is found in Brazil (Rio de Janeiro).

== Description ==
Adults reach a length of about 13 mm. They have a black head. The pronotum is lustrous, partly translucent, with a broad irregular dark brown to black band from the anterior to the posterior margin, wider anteriorly and near the posterior margin, and narrower near the anterior half. The background is pale yellow with diffuse orange patches. The scutellum and elytra are dark brown to black, slightly lustrous. There is a long irregular yellow to orangish spot at mid-length of each elytron, extending from the lateral borders to the suture. The thorax, legs and abdomen are dark brown to black.
