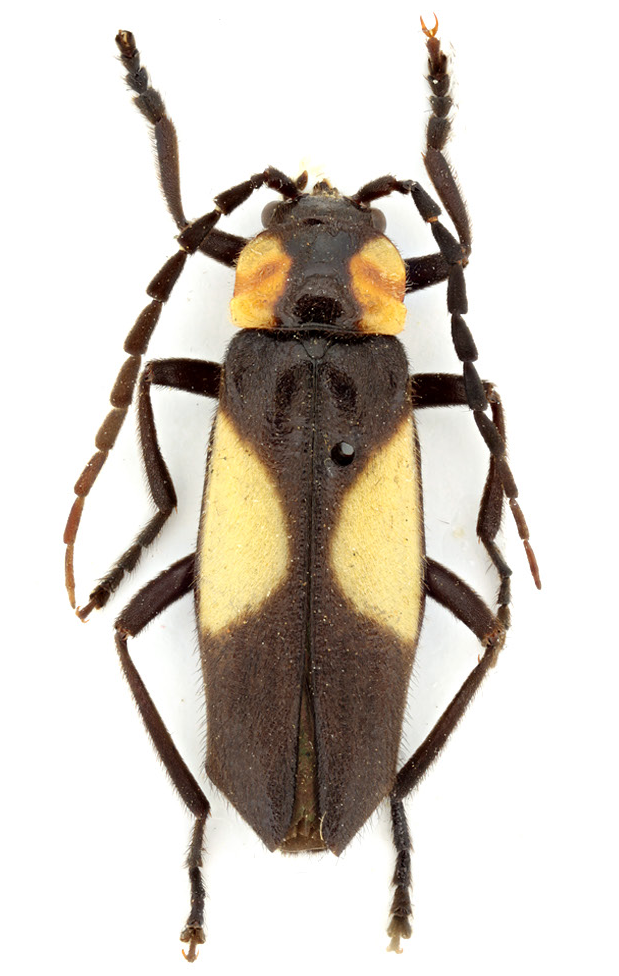

Scientific classification
- Kingdom: Animalia
- Phylum: Arthropoda
- Class: Insecta
- Order: Coleoptera
- Suborder: Polyphaga
- Infraorder: Elateriformia
- Family: Cantharidae
- Genus: Discodon
- Species: D. neoteutonum

Binomial name
- Discodon neoteutonum Biffi & Geiser, 2022

= Discodon neoteutonum =

Species of beetle

Discodon neoteutonum is a species of beetle of the family Cantharidae. This species is found in Brazil (Santa Catarina, Rio Grande do Sul).

== Description ==
Adults reach a length of about 10.4–13 mm. They have a pitch black head. The pronotum is lustrous, translucent, with a broad irregular black band from the anterior to the posterior margin, wider anteriorly and narrower near the middle. The background is bright yellow to light orange with barely defined orange to brownish lateral patches. The scutellum and elytra are pitch black, slightly lustrous. There is a large sulphur to pale yellow hemispheric to triangular spot at mid-length of each elytron, nearly reaching the lateral borders but not meeting at the suture. The thorax, legs and abdomen are pitch black.

== Etymology ==
The epithet neoteutonum refers to the type locality of the species, Nova Teutônia, a district in the Seara municipality in Santa Catarina state, Brazil.
