= Silis crucialis =

Scientific classification
- Domain: Eukaryota
- Kingdom: Animalia
- Phylum: Arthropoda
- Class: Insecta
- Order: Coleoptera
- Suborder: Polyphaga
- Infraorder: Elateriformia
- Family: Cantharidae
- Genus: Silis
- Species: S. crucialis

Binomial name
- Silis crucialis Green, 1966

Species of beetle

Silis crucialis is a species of soldier beetle in the family Cantharidae. It is found in North America.
