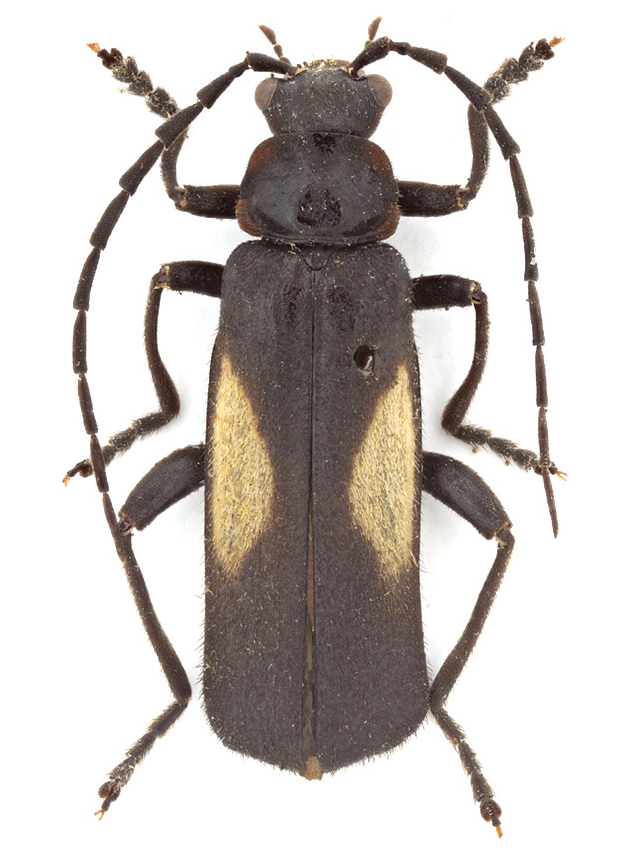

Scientific classification
- Kingdom: Animalia
- Phylum: Arthropoda
- Class: Insecta
- Order: Coleoptera
- Suborder: Polyphaga
- Infraorder: Elateriformia
- Family: Cantharidae
- Genus: Discodon
- Species: D. marginicolle

Binomial name
- Discodon marginicolle Biffi & Geiser, 2022

= Discodon marginicolle =

Species of beetle

Discodon marginicolle is a species of beetle of the family Cantharidae. This species is found in Brazil (Rio de Janeiro).

== Description ==
Adults reach a length of about 11–13 mm. They have a pitch black head. The pronotum is lustrous, mostly black, except for the orangish to dark brown irregular patches near the anterior and posterior angles. The scutellum and elytra are pitch black. There is a large sulphur to greyish hemispheric to triangular spot at mid-length of each elytron, nearly reaching the lateral borders but not meeting at the suture. The thorax, legs and abdomen are pitch black.

== Etymology ==
The epithet refers to the barely defined dark-orangish spot in the margin of the pronotum.
