= Tytthonyx rufiventris =

Scientific classification
- Kingdom: Animalia
- Phylum: Arthropoda
- Class: Insecta
- Order: Coleoptera
- Suborder: Polyphaga
- Infraorder: Elateriformia
- Family: Cantharidae
- Genus: Tytthonyx
- Species: T. rufiventris

Binomial name
- Tytthonyx rufiventris Zaragoza Caballero, 2001

Species of beetle

Tytthonyx rufiventris is a species of soldier beetle in the family Cantharidae.

== Distribution ==
It is found in Mexico.
