= Tytthonyx ruficollis =

Scientific classification
- Domain: Eukaryota
- Kingdom: Animalia
- Phylum: Arthropoda
- Class: Insecta
- Order: Coleoptera
- Suborder: Polyphaga
- Infraorder: Elateriformia
- Family: Cantharidae
- Genus: Tytthonyx
- Species: T. ruficollis

Binomial name
- Tytthonyx ruficollis Schaeffer, 1904

Species of beetle

Tytthonyx ruficollis is a species of soldier beetle in the family Cantharidae. It is found in North America.
