= Silis difficilis =

Scientific classification
- Kingdom: Animalia
- Phylum: Arthropoda
- Clade: Pancrustacea
- Class: Insecta
- Order: Coleoptera
- Suborder: Polyphaga
- Infraorder: Elateriformia
- Family: Cantharidae
- Genus: Silis
- Species: S. difficilis

Binomial name
- Silis difficilis LeConte in Agassiz, 1850

Species of beetle

Silis difficilis is a species of soldier beetle in the family Cantharidae. It is found in North America.

== Subspecies ==
These two subspecies belong to the species Silis difficilis:

- Silis difficilis difficilis^{b}
- Silis difficilis flavida^{b}

Data sources: i = ITIS, c = Catalogue of Life, g = GBIF, b = Bugguide.net
