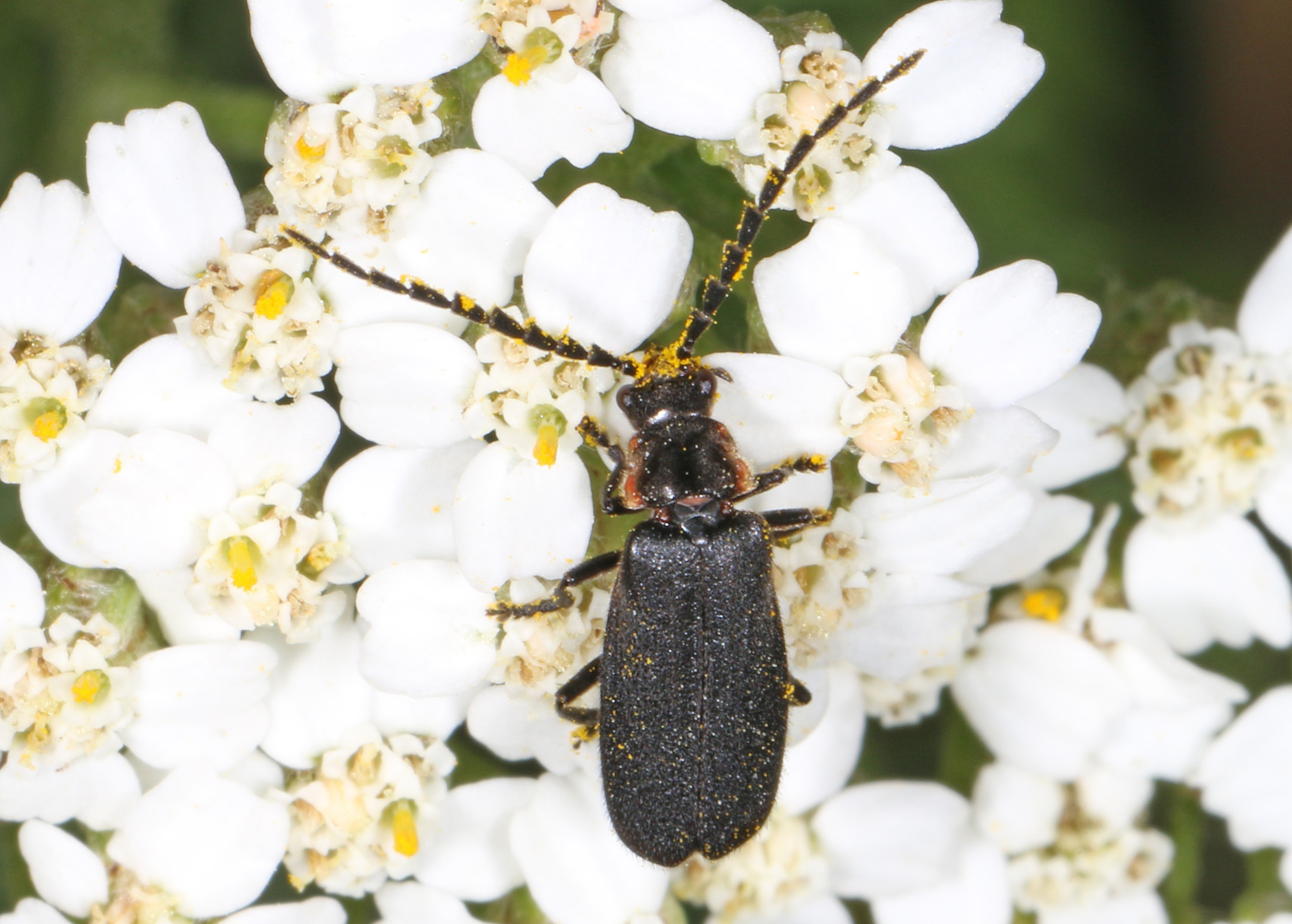

Scientific classification
- Domain: Eukaryota
- Kingdom: Animalia
- Phylum: Arthropoda
- Class: Insecta
- Order: Coleoptera
- Suborder: Polyphaga
- Infraorder: Elateriformia
- Family: Cantharidae
- Genus: Polemius
- Species: P. laticornis

Binomial name
- Polemius laticornis (Say, 1825)

= Polemius laticornis =

Species of beetle

Polemius laticornis is a species of soldier beetle in the family Cantharidae. It is found in North America.
