= Silis spathulata =

Scientific classification
- Kingdom: Animalia
- Phylum: Arthropoda
- Class: Insecta
- Order: Coleoptera
- Suborder: Polyphaga
- Infraorder: Elateriformia
- Family: Cantharidae
- Genus: Silis
- Species: S. spathulata

Binomial name
- Silis spathulata LeConte, 1881

Species of beetle

Silis spathulata is a species of soldier beetle in the family Cantharidae. It is found in North America.
