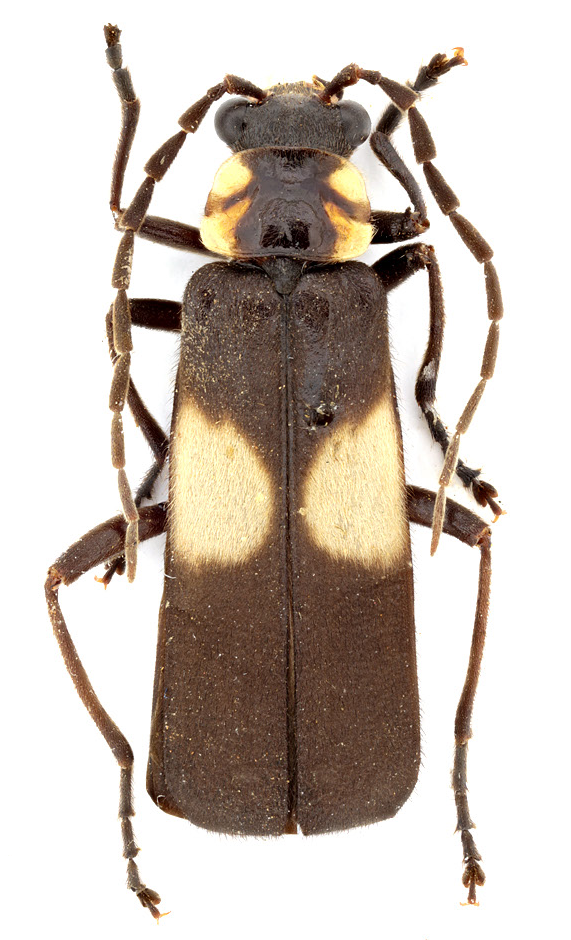

Scientific classification
- Kingdom: Animalia
- Phylum: Arthropoda
- Class: Insecta
- Order: Coleoptera
- Suborder: Polyphaga
- Infraorder: Elateriformia
- Family: Cantharidae
- Genus: Discodon
- Species: D. lineaticorne

Binomial name
- Discodon lineaticorne Biffi & Geiser, 2022

= Discodon lineaticorne =

Species of beetle

Discodon lineaticorne is a species of beetle of the family Cantharidae. This species is found in Brazil (Minas Gerais, São Paulo).

== Description ==
Adults reach a length of about 13–14.3 mm. They have a pitch black head. The pronotum is lustrous, partly translucent, with a broad irregular black band from the anterior to the posterior margin, wider anteriorly and near the posterior margin, and narrower near the anterior half. A pair of diagonal black bands arise from the median band. The background is pale yellow to light orange with barely defined orange patches. The scutellum and elytra are pitch black, slightly lustrous. There is a large whitish to pale yellow round spot at mid-length of each elytron, nearly reaching the lateral borders but not meeting at the suture. The thorax, legs and abdomen are dark brown to black.

== Etymology ==
The epithet refers to the longitudinal antennal lines on antennomeres IX–XI of the males.
