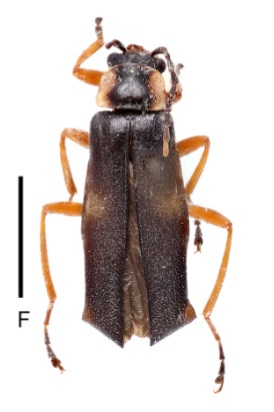

Scientific classification
- Kingdom: Animalia
- Phylum: Arthropoda
- Class: Insecta
- Order: Coleoptera
- Suborder: Polyphaga
- Infraorder: Elateriformia
- Family: Cantharidae
- Genus: Discodon
- Species: D. testaceipes

Binomial name
- Discodon testaceipes Pic, 1930

Synonyms
- Discodon albonotatum var. testaceipes Pic, 1930

= Discodon testaceipes =

Species of beetle

Discodon testaceipes is a species of beetle of the family Cantharidae. This species is found in Brazil (Minas Gerais, Rio Grande do Sul).

== Description ==
Adults reach a length of about 12 mm. They have a black head. The pronotum is lustrous, with a broad irregular black band from the anterior to the posterior margin, wider anteriorly and near the posterior margin, and narrower near the anterior half. The background is testaceous with diffuse orange patches. The scutellum and elytra are black, slightly lustrous. There is a small and weakly defined round yellowish spot at mid-length of each elytron, near the lateral margins. The legs are reddish brown.
