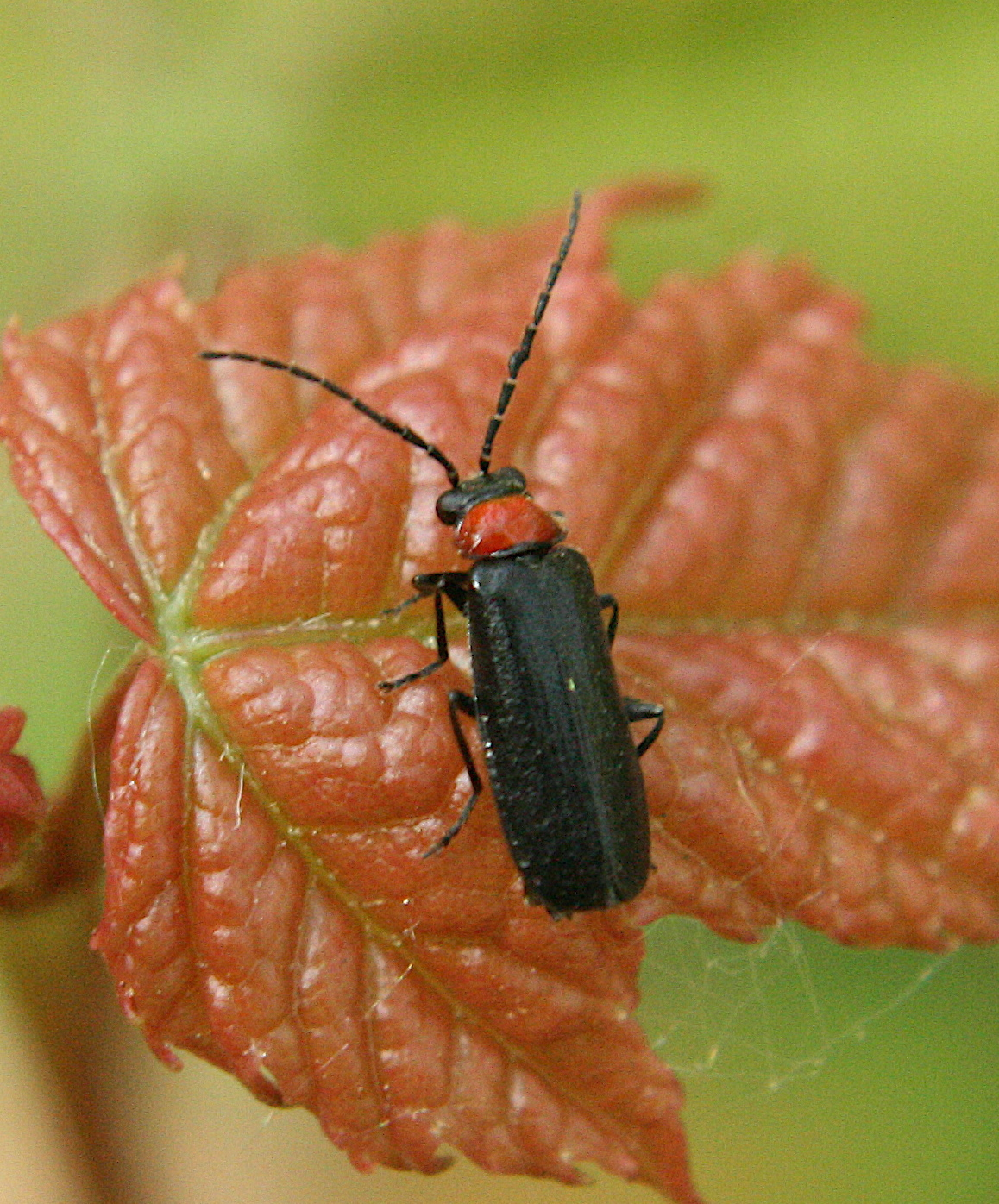
- Silis percomis

Scientific classification
- Kingdom: Animalia
- Phylum: Arthropoda
- Clade: Pancrustacea
- Class: Insecta
- Order: Coleoptera
- Suborder: Polyphaga
- Infraorder: Elateriformia
- Family: Cantharidae
- Subfamily: Silinae
- Tribe: Silini
- Genus: Silis; Charpentier, 1825

Synonyms
- Hapalocrosilis Pic, 1916; Silis Dejean, 1821

= Silis (beetle) =

Genus of beetles

Silis is a genus of soldier beetles in the family Cantharidae, found mostly in Europe and the Americas. There are at least 80 described species in Silis.

== Species ==
These 88 species belong to the genus Silis:

- Silis abdominalis Schaeffer, 1908^{i g}
- Silis abrupta Green, 1966^{i g}
- Silis abstrusa Green, 1966^{i g}
- Silis acuta Green, 1966^{i g}
- Silis alexanderi Fender, 1972^{i g}
- Silis angelica Green, 1966^{i g}
- Silis angulata Green, 1966^{i g}
- Silis arida Green, 1966^{i g}
- Silis arizonica van Dyke, 1918^{i g}
- Silis atra LeConte, 1884^{i g}
- Silis barri Green, 1966^{i g}
- Silis barticana Pic, 1908^{g}
- Silis bidentata (Say, 1825)^{i}
- Silis californica Fender, 1948^{i g}
- Silis carbo van Dyke, 1918^{i g}
- Silis carmelita Green, 1966^{i g b}
- Silis cava LeConte, 1874^{i g}
- Silis constricta Green, 1966^{i g}
- Silis crucialis Green, 1966^{i g b}
- Silis dentigera Green, 1966^{i g}
- Silis deserticola van Dyke, 1918^{i g}
- Silis difficilis LeConte in Agassiz, 1850^{i b}
- Silis disjuncta Green, 1966^{i g}
- Silis divaricata Green, 1966^{i g}
- Silis egregia Green, 1966^{i g}
- Silis emarginata Green, 1966^{i g}
- Silis eximia Green, 1966^{i g}
- Silis fabulosa Green, 1966^{i g}
- Silis fenderi Green, 1966^{i g}
- Silis fenestrata van Dyke, 1918^{i g}
- Silis filicornis van Dyke, 1918^{i g}
- Silis filigera LeConte, 1874^{i g}
- Silis flavida LeConte, 1874^{i g}
- Silis fossiger LeConte, 1881^{i g}
- Silis freemani Brown, 1940^{i g}
- Silis greeni Fender, 1971^{i g}
- Silis howdeni Green, 1966^{i g}
- Silis humeralis Pic, 1909^{g}
- Silis incongrua Green, 1966^{i g}
- Silis insolita Green, 1966^{i g}
- Silis insperata Green, 1966^{i g}
- Silis introversa Green, 1966^{i g}
- Silis knulli Green, 1966^{i g}
- Silis lasseni Green, 1966^{i g}
- Silis latilobus Blatchley, 1910^{i g}
- Silis latistylus Green, 1966^{i g}
- Silis lecontei Green, 1966^{i g}
- Silis lemoulti Pic, 1909^{g}
- Silis lobata Green, 1966^{i g}
- Silis lutea LeConte in Melsheimer, 1853^{i g b}
- Silis macclayi Green, 1966^{i g}
- Silis maritima van Dyke, 1918^{i g}
- Silis montanica Green, 1966^{i g}
- Silis nevadica Green, 1966^{i g}
- Silis nigerrima Schaeffer, 1908^{i g}
- Silis nitidula (Fabricius, 1792)^{g}
- Silis obtusa LeConte, 1874^{i g}
- Silis oregonensis Green, 1966^{i g}
- Silis pallida Mannerheim, 1843^{i g b}
- Silis parallela Green, 1966^{i g}
- Silis percomis (Say, 1835)^{i g b}
- Silis perfoliata Green, 1966^{i g}
- Silis perforata LeConte, 1881^{i g}
- Silis peruviana Pic, 1906^{g}
- Silis protracta Green, 1966^{i g}
- Silis proxima Green, 1966^{i g}
- Silis recta Green, 1966^{i g}
- Silis reversa Green, 1966^{i g}
- Silis rogueti Constantin, 2012^{g}
- Silis ruficollis (Fabricius, 1775)^{g}
- Silis rugosa van Dyke, 1918^{i g}
- Silis simulata Green, 1966^{i g}
- Silis singularis Green, 1966^{i g}
- Silis solitaria Green, 1966^{i g}
- Silis spathulata LeConte, 1881^{i g b}
- Silis spinigera LeConte, 1874^{i g b}
- Silis spinigerula Fender, 1972^{i g}
- Silis striatella Green, 1966^{i g}
- Silis subimpressa Pic, 1909^{g}
- Silis subtruncata Green, 1966^{i g}
- Silis tardella Green, 1966^{i g}
- Silis tenuata Green, 1966^{i g}
- Silis thermalis Green, 1966^{i g}
- Silis tricornis van Dyke, 1918^{i g}
- Silis triplicata Green, 1966^{i g}
- Silis ursina Green, 1966^{i g}
- Silis vandykei Green, 1966^{i g}
- Silis vulnerata LeConte, 1874^{i g}

Data sources: i = ITIS, c = Catalogue of Life, g = GBIF, b = Bugguide.net
