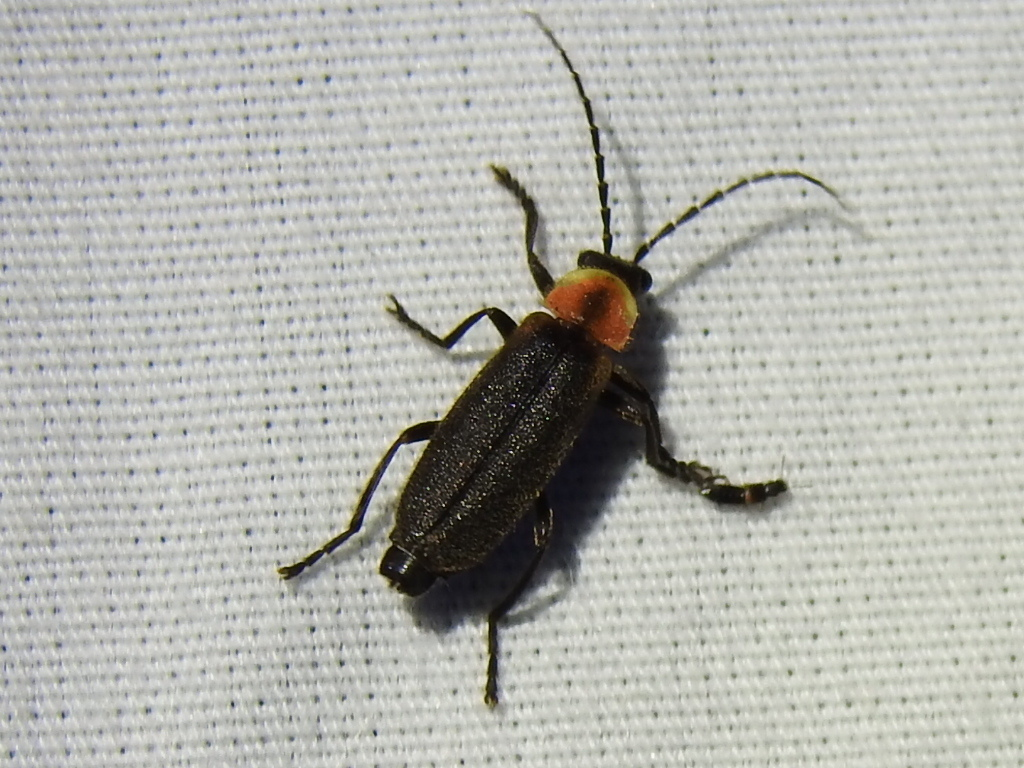

Scientific classification
- Domain: Eukaryota
- Kingdom: Animalia
- Phylum: Arthropoda
- Class: Insecta
- Order: Coleoptera
- Suborder: Polyphaga
- Infraorder: Elateriformia
- Family: Cantharidae
- Genus: Discodon
- Species: D. planicolle

Binomial name
- Discodon planicolle (LeConte, 1858)

= Discodon planicolle =

Species of beetle

Discodon planicolle is a species of soldier beetle in the family Cantharidae. It is found in North America.
