= Silis spinigera =

Scientific classification
- Kingdom: Animalia
- Phylum: Arthropoda
- Class: Insecta
- Order: Coleoptera
- Suborder: Polyphaga
- Infraorder: Elateriformia
- Family: Cantharidae
- Genus: Silis
- Species: S. spinigera

Binomial name
- Silis spinigera LeConte, 1874

Species of beetle

Silis spinigera is a species of soldier beetle in the family Cantharidae. It is found in North America.
