= Weston Fen, Oxfordshire =

Biological site of specific scientific interest in Oxfordshire

Coordinates: 51.872°N 1.239°W

- Site of Special Scientific Interest
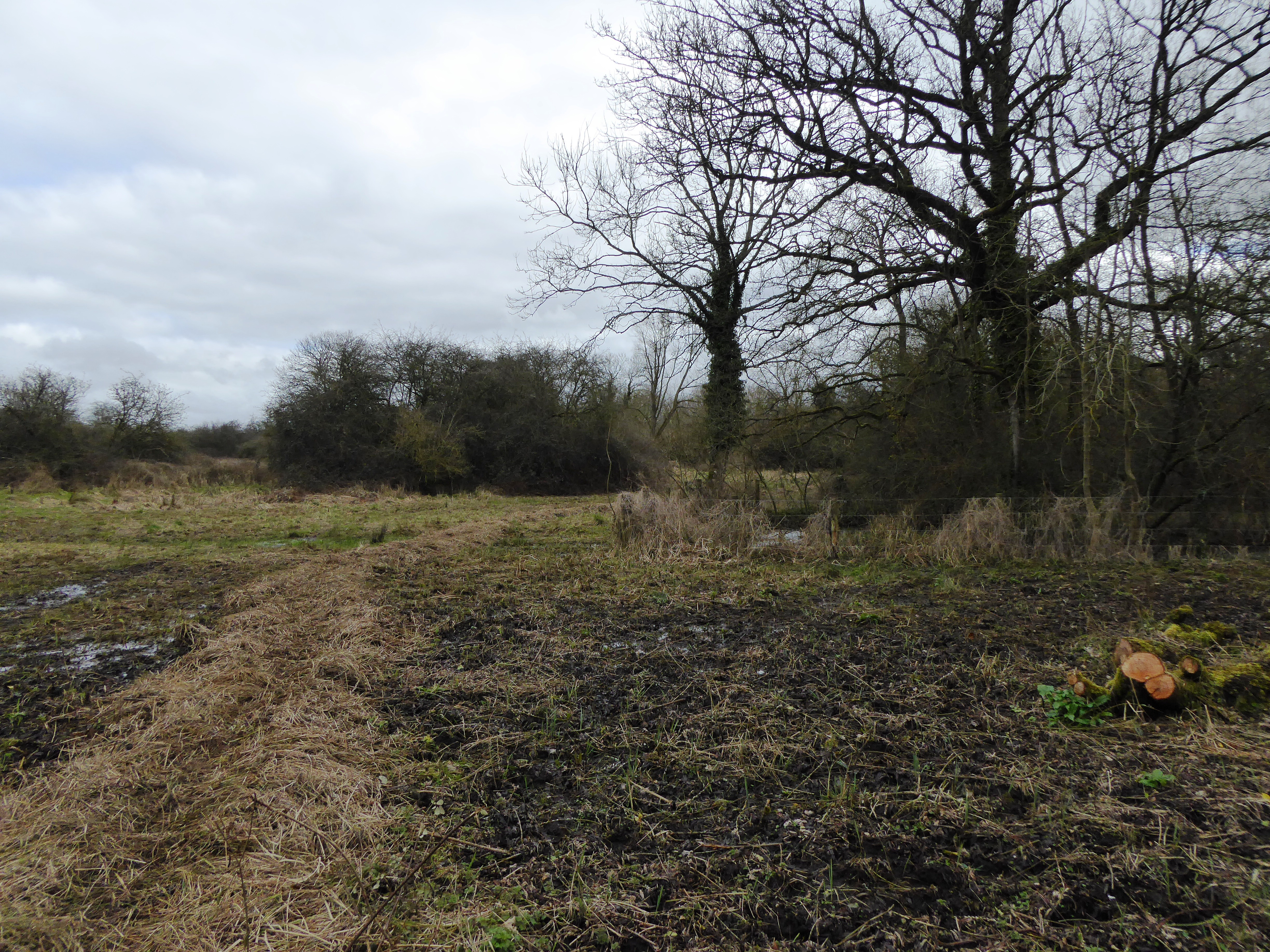
- Location of Weston Fen, Oxfordshire.
- Area of search: Oxfordshire
- Grid reference: SP 525 195
- Interest: Biological
- Area: 14.0 hectares (35 acres)
- Notification date: 1986
- Location map: Magic Map

Weston Fen is a 14-hectare (35-acre) biological Site of Special Scientific Interest north of Weston-on-the-Green in Oxfordshire.

This site has diverse habitats, including a fast-flowing stream, species-rich, calcareous fen, willow carr, hazel woodland, limestone grassland and marshy grassland. There are several rare species of beetle, such as Sphaerius acaroides, Eubria palustris, Silis ruficollis and Agabus biguttatus.

The site is private land, but a public footpath runs through it.
