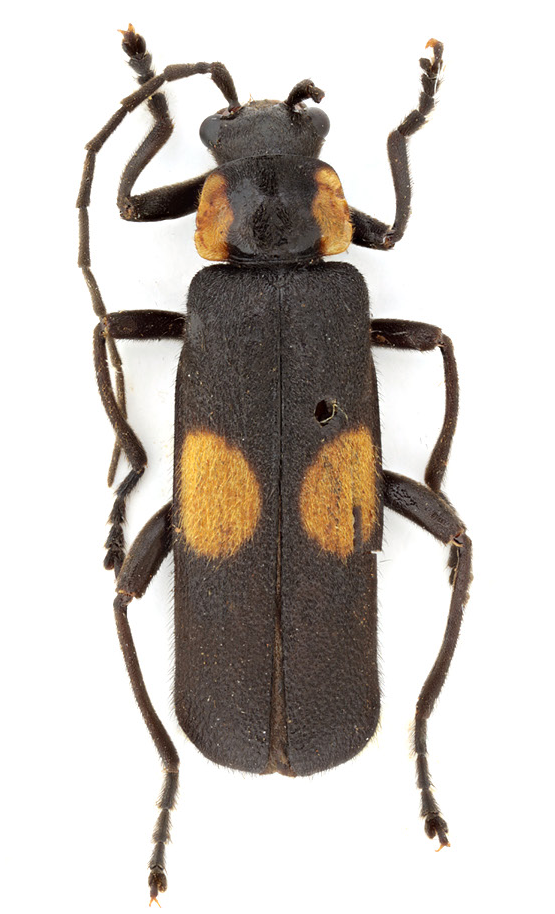

Scientific classification
- Kingdom: Animalia
- Phylum: Arthropoda
- Class: Insecta
- Order: Coleoptera
- Suborder: Polyphaga
- Infraorder: Elateriformia
- Family: Cantharidae
- Genus: Discodon
- Species: D. aurimaculatum

Binomial name
- Discodon aurimaculatum Biffi & Geiser, 2022

= Discodon aurimaculatum =

Species of beetle

Discodon aurimaculatum is a species of beetle of the family Cantharidae. This species is found in Brazil (Rio de Janeiro, São Paulo).

== Description ==
Adults reach a length of about 11.7–13 mm. They have a pitch black head. The pronotum is lustrous, partly translucent, with a broad irregular black band from the anterior to the posterior margin, wider anteriorly and near the posterior margin, and narrower near the anterior half. There are no lateral dark bands or patches. The background is pale yellow to light orange with barely defined orange regions. The scutellum and elytra are pitch black. There is a pale-yellow round spot at mid-length of each elytron, meeting the lateral borders but not meeting at the suture. The thorax, legs and abdomen are dark brown to black.

== Etymology ==
The epithet refers to the dark yellowish to golden rounded elytral spots.
