= Discodon flavomarginatum =

Scientific classification
- Domain: Eukaryota
- Kingdom: Animalia
- Phylum: Arthropoda
- Class: Insecta
- Order: Coleoptera
- Suborder: Polyphaga
- Infraorder: Elateriformia
- Family: Cantharidae
- Genus: Discodon
- Species: D. flavomarginatum

Binomial name
- Discodon flavomarginatum Schaeffer, 1908

Species of beetle

Discodon flavomarginatum is a species of beetle native to Arizona in the United States. Its color varies throughout the body, which is 14 millimetres (0.55 in) long. It has a rounded thorax and roughly textured elytra.

== Taxonomy ==
Discodon flavomarginatum was described by Charles Schaeffer in 1908. The type locality was given as the Huachuca Mountains, Arizona in the United States.

== Description ==
The head is mostly black, with the front yellow. The black part is punctate, dotted with small holes. The antennae are black and slender, extending past the middle of the elytra. Its joints are elongate. The thorax is largely rounded, completely free of angles, and the hind angles are rounded as well. In color, it is reddish, with a black band across the body. The elytra are weakly dilated just before the shoulders, rough in texture and dark brown in color (although pale along the edges). The underside — except the thorax — is black. It is 14 mm (0.55 in) long.
