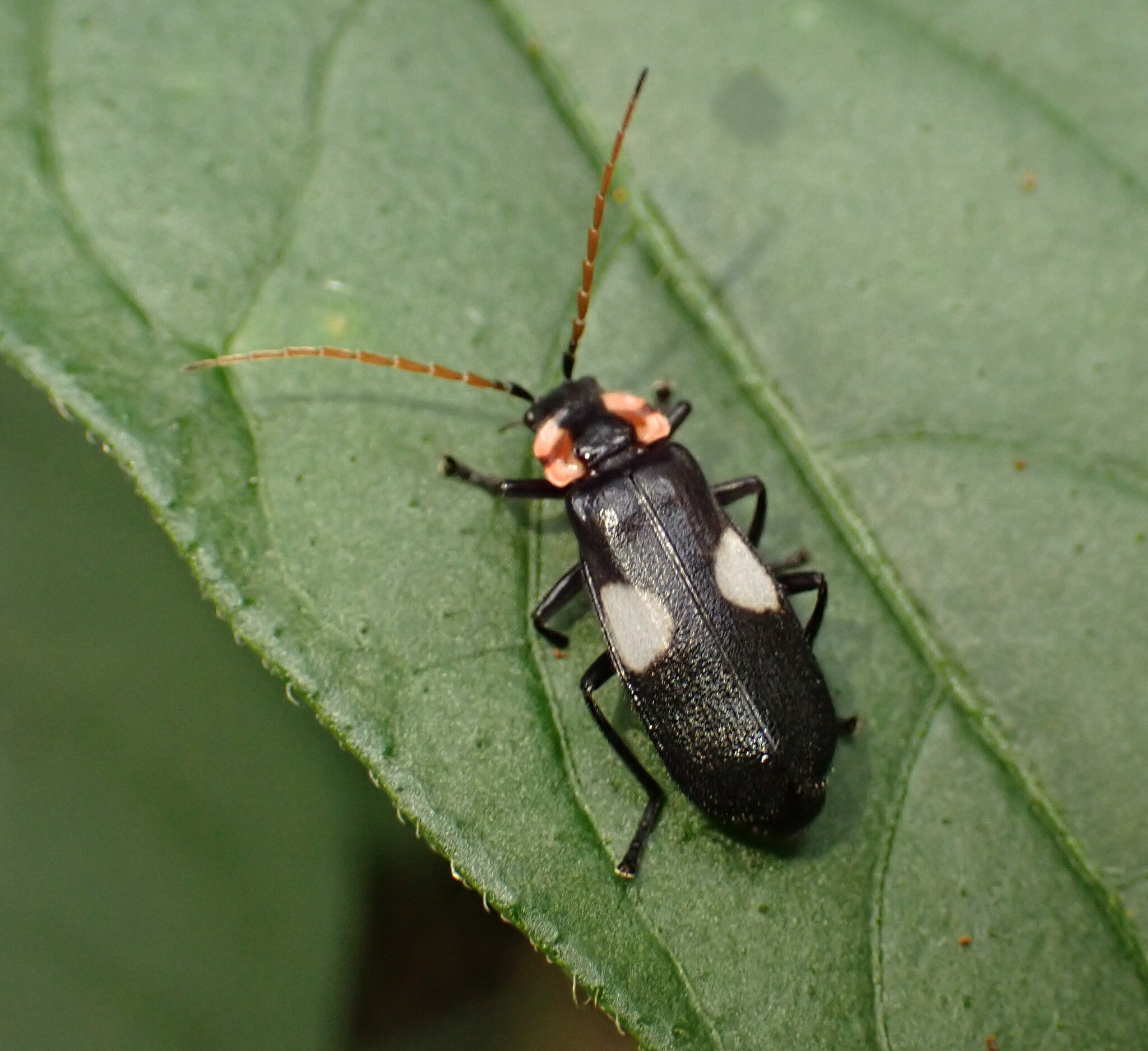

Scientific classification
- Kingdom: Animalia
- Phylum: Arthropoda
- Clade: Pancrustacea
- Class: Insecta
- Order: Coleoptera
- Suborder: Polyphaga
- Infraorder: Elateriformia
- Family: Cantharidae
- Genus: Discodon
- Species: D. tricolor

Binomial name
- Discodon tricolor (Guérin-Méneville, 1832)

Synonyms
- Silis tricolor Guérin-Méneville, 1832; Discodon albonotatum Pic, 1906

= Discodon tricolor =

Species of beetle

Discodon tricolor is a species of beetle of the family Cantharidae. This species is found in Brazil (Minas Gerais, Rio de Janeiro, São Paulo).

== Description ==
Adults reach a length of about 10.4–14 mm. They have a pitch black head. The pronotum is lustrous and translucent, with a broad irregular black band from the anterior to the posterior margin, wider posteriorly and narrower near the anterior margin. The background is bright yellow to light orange with barely defined orange and brown lateral patches. The scutellum and elytra are pitch black, slightly lustrous. At mid-length of each elytron, there is a large whitish to pale yellow round spot nearly reaching the lateral borders but not meeting at the suture. The thorax, legs and abdomen are pitch black.
