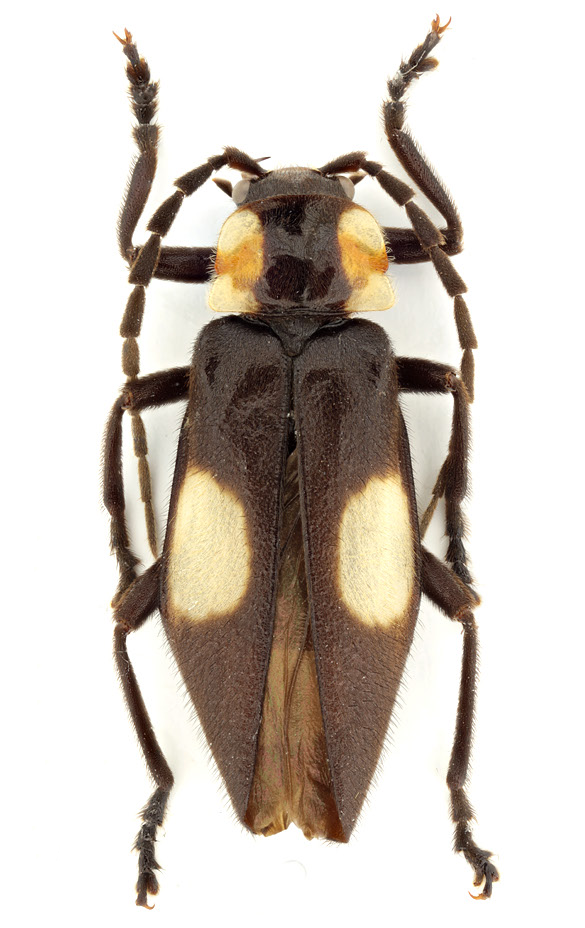

Scientific classification
- Kingdom: Animalia
- Phylum: Arthropoda
- Class: Insecta
- Order: Coleoptera
- Suborder: Polyphaga
- Infraorder: Elateriformia
- Family: Cantharidae
- Genus: Discodon
- Species: D. tamoio

Binomial name
- Discodon tamoio Biffi & Geiser, 2022

= Discodon tamoio =

Species of beetle

Discodon tamoio is a species of beetle of the family Cantharidae. This species is found in Brazil (São Paulo, Rio de Janeiro).

== Description ==
Adults reach a length of about 10.4–13.6 mm. They have a pitch black head. The pronotum is lustrous, translucent, with a broad irregular black band from the anterior to the posterior margin, wider anteriorly and near the posterior margin, and narrower near the anterior half. The background is pale yellow to light orange with barely defined orange and brown lateral patches. The scutellum and elytra are pitch black, slightly lustrous. There is a large whitish to pale yellow round spot at mid-length of each elytron, nearly reaching the lateral borders but not meeting at the suture. The thorax, legs and abdomen are pitch black.

== Etymology ==
The epithet refers to the Tamoio indigenous people, that inhabited the same region as D. tamoio, currently comprising part of the coast of São Paulo and Rio de Janeiro states, Brazil.
