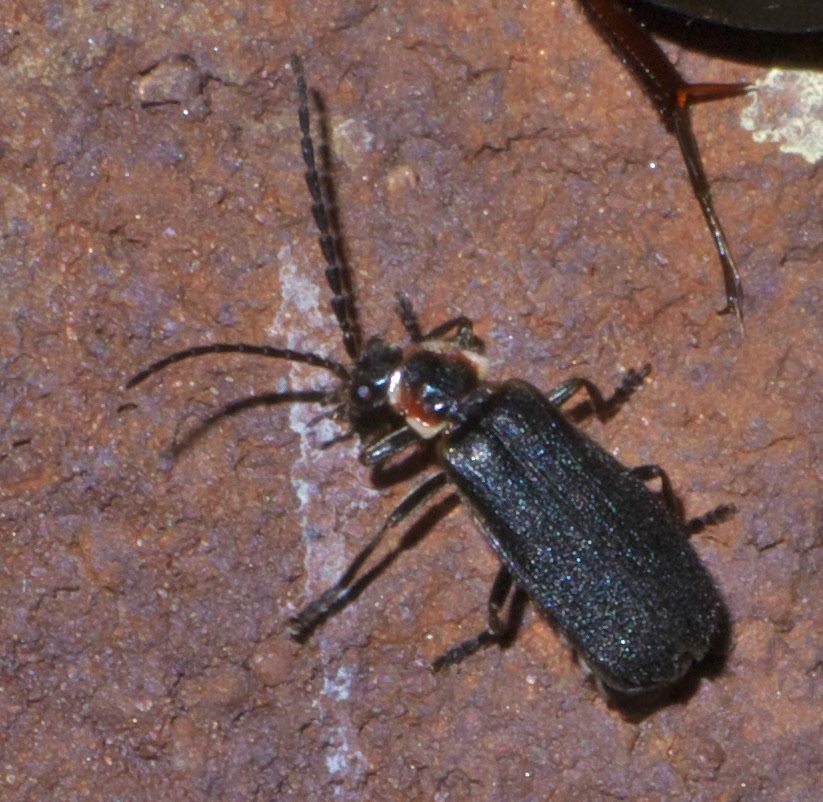
- Polemius repandus

Scientific classification
- Kingdom: Animalia
- Phylum: Arthropoda
- Class: Insecta
- Order: Coleoptera
- Suborder: Polyphaga
- Infraorder: Elateriformia
- Family: Cantharidae
- Tribe: Silini
- Genus: Polemius; LeConte, 1851

= Polemius =

Genus of beetles

Polemius is a genus of soldier beetles in the family Cantharidae. There are about 16 described species in Polemius.

== Species ==
These 16 species belong to the genus Polemius:

- Polemius arizonensis Schaeffer, 1908
- Polemius binotatus Fall, 1907
- Polemius canadensis Brown, 1940
- Polemius crassicornis Wickham, 1914
- Polemius hispaniolae Leng & Mutchler
- Polemius languidus Horn, 1894
- Polemius laticornis (Say, 1825)
- Polemius limbatus LeConte, 1851
- Polemius niger Schaeffer, 1908
- Polemius princeps LeConte, 1885
- Polemius regularis Fall, 1907
- Polemius repandus LeConte, 1866
- Polemius strenuus LeConte, 1885
- Polemius suturalis Blatchley, 1928
- Polemius telephoroides (Schaeffer, 1909)
- Polemius unisulcatus Wittmer
