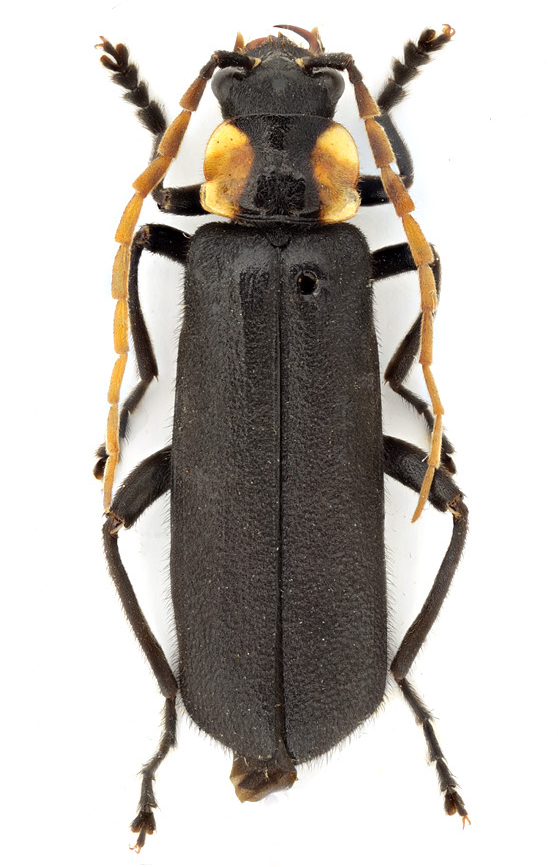

Scientific classification
- Kingdom: Animalia
- Phylum: Arthropoda
- Class: Insecta
- Order: Coleoptera
- Suborder: Polyphaga
- Infraorder: Elateriformia
- Family: Cantharidae
- Genus: Discodon
- Species: D. tenuecostatum

Binomial name
- Discodon tenuecostatum Biffi & Geiser, 2022

= Discodon tenuecostatum =

Species of beetle

Discodon tenuecostatum is a species of beetle of the family Cantharidae. This species is found in Brazil (Rio de Janeiro).

== Description ==
Adults reach a length of about 11.7–16.2 mm. They have a pitch black head. The pronotum is lustrous, partly translucent, with a broad irregular black band from the anterior to the posterior margin, wider anteriorly and near the posterior margin, and narrower near the anterior half. The background is pale yellow with diffuse orange regions. The scutellum and elytra are entirely pitch black, slightly lustrous. The thorax, legs and abdomen are black.

== Etymology ==
The epithet refers to the weakly defined longitudinal elytral costulae in both males and females.
