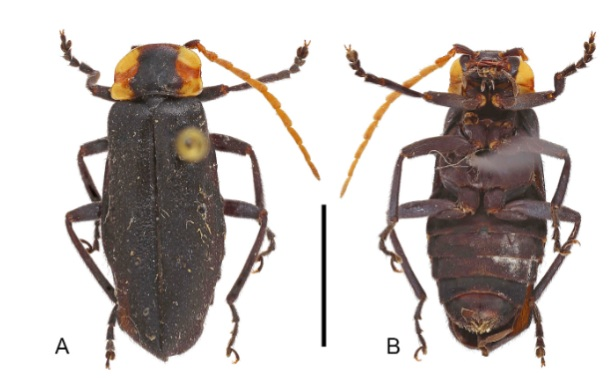

Scientific classification
- Kingdom: Animalia
- Phylum: Arthropoda
- Class: Insecta
- Order: Coleoptera
- Suborder: Polyphaga
- Infraorder: Elateriformia
- Family: Cantharidae
- Genus: Discodon
- Species: D. obscurior

Binomial name
- Discodon obscurior Pic, 1906

Synonyms
- Discodon albonotatum var. obscurior Pic, 1906

= Discodon obscurior =

Species of beetle

Discodon obscurior is a species of beetle of the family Cantharidae. This species is found in Brazil (Rio de Janeiro).

== Description ==
Adults reach a length of about 11–13 mm. They have a pitch black head. The pronotum is lustrous, partly translucent, with a broad irregular black band from the anterior to the posterior margin, and a black band (usually with lateral projections) in the posterior third. The background is pale yellow with diffuse orange regions. The scutellum and elytra are entirely pitch black, slightly lustrous. The thorax, legs and abdomen are black.
