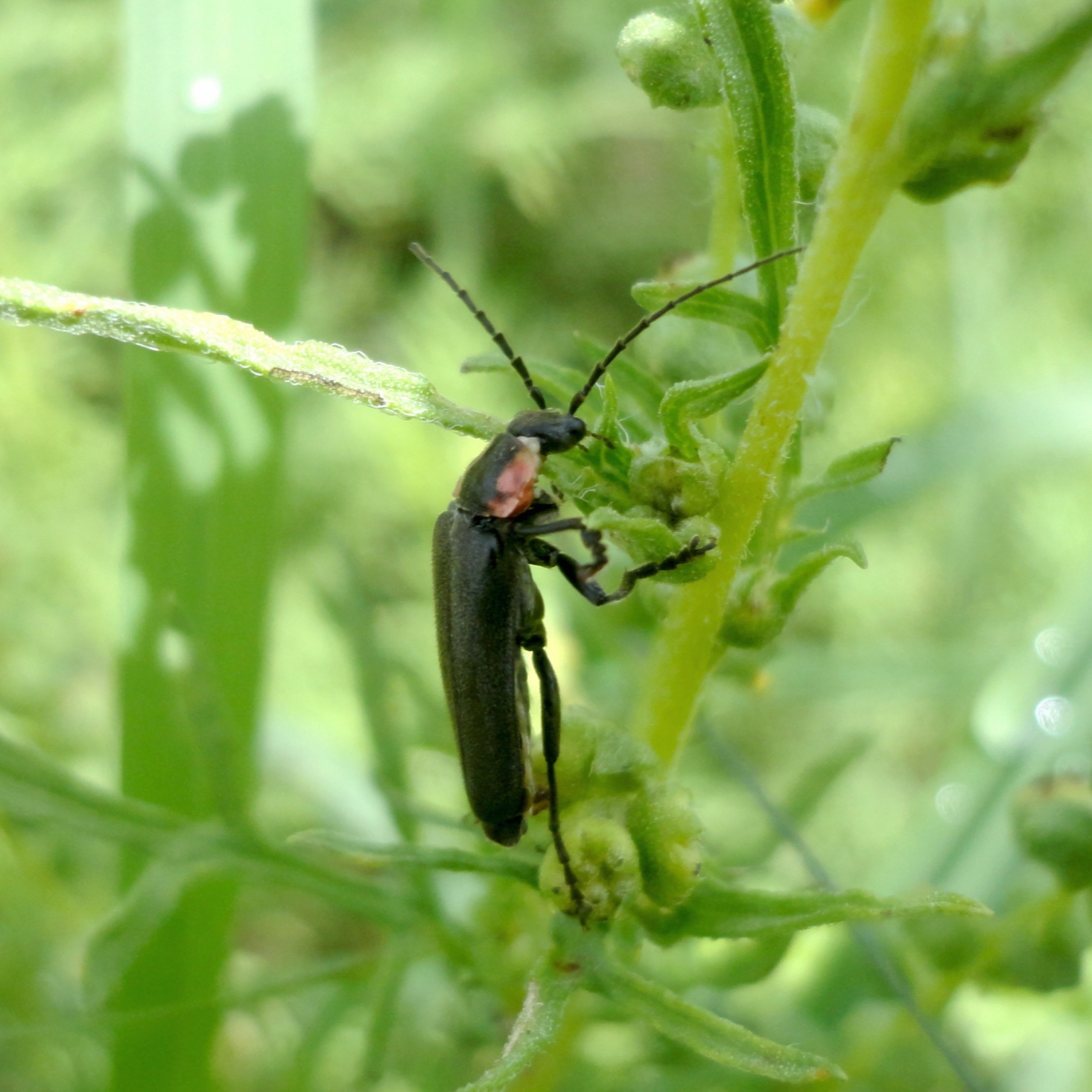
- Discodon normale

Scientific classification
- Kingdom: Animalia
- Phylum: Arthropoda
- Clade: Pancrustacea
- Class: Insecta
- Order: Coleoptera
- Suborder: Polyphaga
- Infraorder: Elateriformia
- Family: Cantharidae
- Tribe: Silini
- Genus: Discodon; Gorham, 1881

= Discodon =

Genus of beetles

Discodon is a genus of soldier beetles in the family Cantharidae. There are more than 40 described species in Discodon. The term is said to encompass around 400 species, which is mostly found in South America, from sea-level up to 3000 meters.

== Selected species ==
These species belong to the genus Discodon:

- Discodon abdominale Schaeffer, 1909
- Discodon abdominalis Schaeffer
- Discodon amazonum Pic, 1950
- Discodon arcuatum Constantin, 2015
- Discodon arnetti Wittmer
- Discodon aurimaculatum Biffi & Geiser, 2022
- Discodon bicoloricolle Pic, 1927
- Discodon bipunctatum Schaeffer, 1908
- Discodon brulei Constantin, 2015
- Discodon chapini Wittmer
- Discodon crassipes Wittmer, 1952
- Discodon dalensi Constantin, 2015
- Discodon dewynteri Constantin, 2015
- Discodon dichromum (Fauvel, 1861)
- Discodon fernandezorum Constantin, 2015
- Discodon flavimarginatus Schaeffer
- Discodon flavomarginatum Schaeffer, 1908
- Discodon francillonnei Constantin, 2015
- Discodon fuscomaculatum Constantin, 2015
- Discodon gracilicorne Pic, 1910
- Discodon hirticorne Constantin, 2015
- Discodon huadquinaense Wittmer
- Discodon humeropictum Wittmer
- Discodon itoupense Constantin, 2015
- Discodon lamarrei Constantin, 2015
- Discodon lemoulti Pic, 1910
- Discodon lineaticorne Biffi & Geiser, 2022
- Discodon luteicorne Constantin, 2015
- Discodon mantillerii Constantin, 2015
- Discodon marginicolle Biffi & Geiser, 2022
- Discodon maroninum Pic, 1930
- Discodon melanocerum Constantin, 2015
- Discodon montis Constantin, 2015
- Discodon nazareti Constantin, 2015
- Discodon neoteutonum Biffi & Geiser, 2022
- Discodon nigripes Gorham, 1881
- Discodon nigrocephalum Pic, 1949
- Discodon nouraguense Constantin, 2015
- Discodon obscurior Pic, 1906
- Discodon pascali Constantin, 2015
- Discodon peruvianum Wittmer
- Discodon planicolle (LeConte, 1858)
- Discodon platycorne Constantin, 2015
- Discodon poirieri Constantin, 2015
- Discodon quadrinotatum Constantin, 2015
- Discodon rufohumerale Pic, 1910
- Discodon saulense Constantin, 2015
- Discodon surinamense Pic, 1906
- Discodon taghavianae Constantin, 2015
- Discodon tamoio Biffi & Geiser, 2022
- Discodon tenuecostatum Biffi & Geiser, 2022
- Discodon testaceipes Pic, 1930
- Discodon touroulti Constantin, 2015
- Discodon tricolor (Guérin-Méneville, 1832)
- Discodon vanini Biffi & Geiser, 2022
- Discodon viridimontanum Biffi & Geiser, 2022
- Discodon yvineci Constantin, 2015
