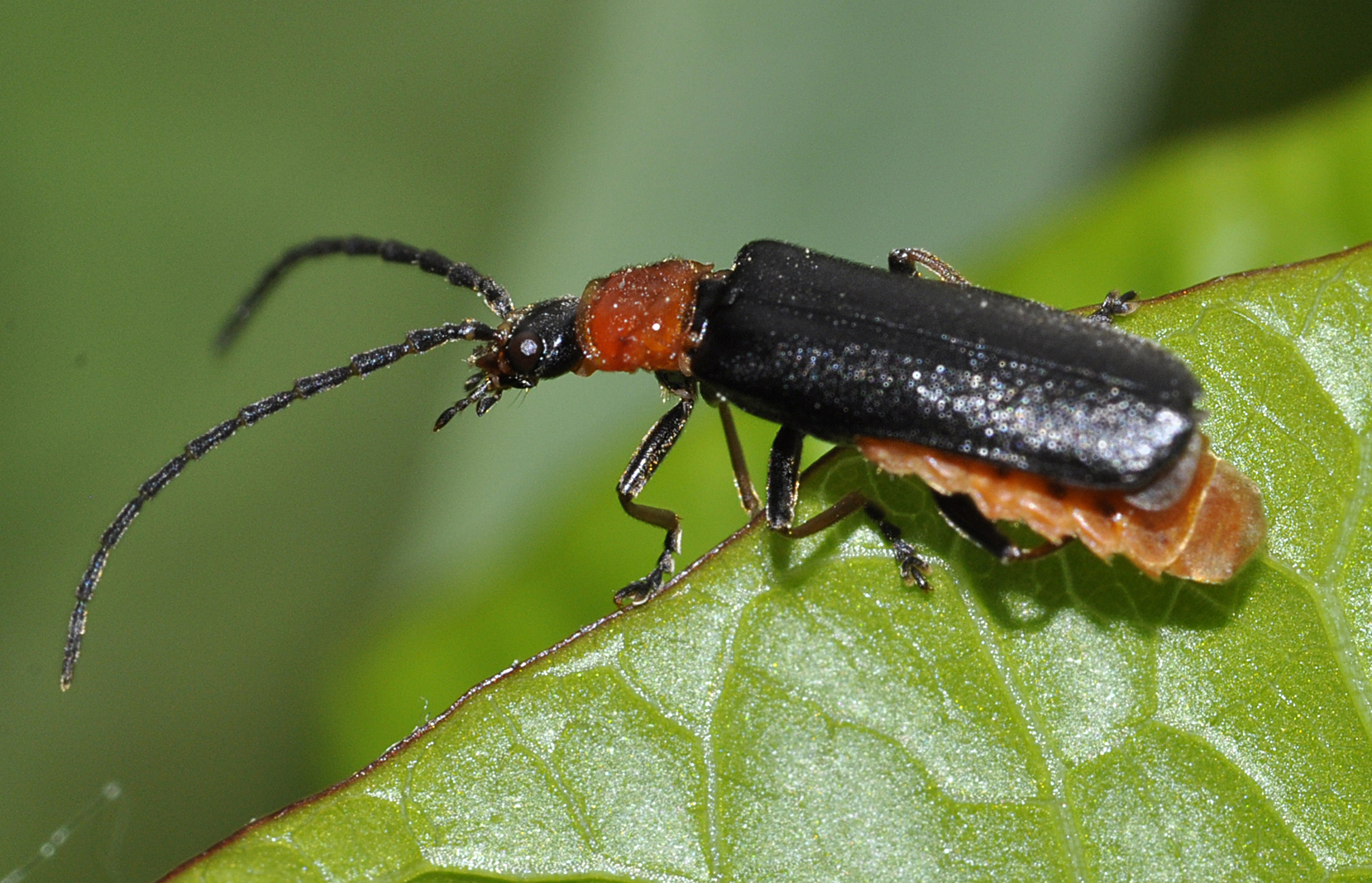
- Crudosilis ruficollis Germany

Scientific classification
- Domain: Eukaryota
- Kingdom: Animalia
- Phylum: Arthropoda
- Class: Insecta
- Order: Coleoptera
- Suborder: Polyphaga
- Infraorder: Elateriformia
- Family: Cantharidae
- Genus: Crudosilis
- Species: C. ruficollis

Binomial name
- Crudosilis ruficollis (Fabricius, 1775)

Synonyms
- Silis ruficollis (Fabricius, 1775); Cantharis ruficollis Fabricius, 1775

= Crudosilis ruficollis =

Species of beetle

Crudosilis ruficollis is a species of soldier beetles native to Europe.
