= List of Rhagonycha species =

This is a list of 145 species in Rhagonycha, a genus of soldier beetles in the family Cantharidae.

== Rhagonycha species ==
- Rhagonycha addenda Dahlgren, 1972
- Rhagonycha aetolica (Kiesenwetter, 1852)^{g}
- Rhagonycha alaskensis Fender, 1972^{i g}
- Rhagonycha aliena Dahlgren, 1972^{g}
- Rhagonycha andalusica Dahlgren, 1975^{g}
- Rhagonycha angulata (Say, 1823)^{i g b}
- Rhagonycha angulatocollis Costa, 1858^{g}
- Rhagonycha antennata (Green, 1941)^{i g}
- Rhagonycha anthracina Mannerheim, 1853^{i g}
- Rhagonycha approximana (Fairmaire, 1884)^{g}
- Rhagonycha atra (Linnaeus, 1767)^{g}
- Rhagonycha balcanica Pic, 1901^{g}
- Rhagonycha bohaci Svihla, 1990^{g}
- Rhagonycha campestris (Green, 1941)^{i g b}
- Rhagonycha carpathica Ganglbauer, 1896^{g}
- Rhagonycha cartwrighti (Green, 1941)^{i g b}
- Rhagonycha caspica Wittmer, 1972^{g}
- Rhagonycha chevrolati Marseul, 1864^{g}
- Rhagonycha chlorotica (Gené, 1839)^{g}
- Rhagonycha cloughi (Miskimen, 1956)^{i g}
- Rhagonycha coloradensis (Green, 1941)^{i g b}
- Rhagonycha complicans Dahlgren, 1979^{g}
- Rhagonycha confusa Dahlgren, 1975^{g}
- Rhagonycha corcyrea Pic, 1901^{g}
- Rhagonycha costipennis (LeConte, 1884)^{i g}
- Rhagonycha cruentata (Reiche, 1862)^{g}
- Rhagonycha cruralis (LeConte, 1851)^{i g b}
- Rhagonycha decorata Pic, 1912^{g}
- Rhagonycha degener (Blatchley, 1928)^{i g}
- Rhagonycha delagrangei Pic, 1898^{g}
- Rhagonycha dichroa LeConte, 1851^{g b}
- Rhagonycha diversipes Pic, 1905
- Rhagonycha divisa Dahlgren, 1972^{g}
- Rhagonycha drienensis Dahlgren, 1978^{g}
- Rhagonycha elbursiaca Wittmer, 1972^{g}
- Rhagonycha elongata (Fallén, 1807)^{g}
- Rhagonycha esfandiarii Wittmer, 1972^{g}
- Rhagonycha excavata (LeConte, 1851)^{i g b}
- Rhagonycha falcifera Dahlgren, 1972^{g}
- Rhagonycha femoralis (Brulle, 1832)^{g}
- Rhagonycha fenderi (Miskimen, 1956)^{i g}
- Rhagonycha fraxini (Say, 1823)^{i g b}
- Rhagonycha fugax Mannerheim, 1843^{g}
- Rhagonycha fulva (Scopoli, 1763)^{i g b} (common red soldier beetle)
- Rhagonycha fulvaliena Svihla, 1995^{g}
- Rhagonycha fuscitibia Rey, 1891^{g}
- Rhagonycha galiciana Gougelet, 1859
- Rhagonycha gallica Pic, 1923^{g}
- Rhagonycha genistae Kiesenwetter, 1865^{g}
- Rhagonycha ghilanensis Dahlgren, 1985^{g}
- Rhagonycha gilvipennis (Rosenhauer, 1856)^{g}
- Rhagonycha gilvipes (Gemminger, 1870)^{i g}
- Rhagonycha greeni (Fall, 1936)^{i g b}
- Rhagonycha helleni Dahlgren, 1968^{g}
- Rhagonycha herbea Marseul, 1864^{g}
- Rhagonycha hesperica Baudi, 1859^{g}
- Rhagonycha heterodoxa (Green, 1941)^{i g b}
- Rhagonycha hirticula (Green, 1941)^{i g b}
- Rhagonycha hispanica Pic, 1932^{g}
- Rhagonycha hyrcana Svihla, 2002^{g}
- Rhagonycha iberica Dahlgren, 1975^{g}
- Rhagonycha imbecillis (LeConte, 1851)^{i g b}
- Rhagonycha impar (LeConte, 1881)^{i g}
- Rhagonycha interposita Dahlgren, 1978^{g}
- Rhagonycha iranica Wittmer, 1972^{g}
- Rhagonycha karsensis Svihla, 1995^{g}
- Rhagonycha kefallinica Dahlgren, 1975^{g}
- Rhagonycha kiesenwetteri (Marseul, 1864)^{g}
- Rhagonycha kubanensis Pic, 1900^{g}
- Rhagonycha kuleghana (Marseul, 1868)^{g}
- Rhagonycha kurdistana Svihla, 1983^{g}
- Rhagonycha lencoranica Kazantsev, 1992^{g}
- Rhagonycha lignosa (Müller, 1764)^{g}
- Rhagonycha limbata Thomson, 1864^{g}
- Rhagonycha lineola (Fabricius, 1792)^{i g b}
- Rhagonycha longula (LeConte, 1851)^{i g b}
- Rhagonycha luristana Svihla, 1995^{g}
- Rhagonycha lutea (Müller, 1764)^{g}
- Rhagonycha luteicollis (Germar, 1824)^{i g b}
- Rhagonycha macedonica Dahlgren, 1985^{g}
- Rhagonycha machulkai Svihla, 1993^{g}
- Rhagonycha maculicollis Märkel, 1852^{g}
- Rhagonycha mandibularis (Kirby in Richards, 1837)^{i g b}
- Rhagonycha martini Pic, 1908^{g}
- Rhagonycha meridionalis Dahlgren, 1975^{g}
- Rhagonycha micheli Okushima & Yang, 2013^{g}
- Rhagonycha milleri Kiesenwetter, 1860^{g}
- Rhagonycha mimetica (Green, 1941)^{i g}
- Rhagonycha mollis (Fall, 1936)^{i b}
- Rhagonycha morio Kiesenwetter, 1852^{g}
- Rhagonycha morvani Wittmer, 1974^{g}
- Rhagonycha nanula (LeConte, 1881)^{i g b}
- Rhagonycha neglecta Dahlgren, 1975^{g}
- Rhagonycha nevadensis Svihla, 1995^{g}
- Rhagonycha nigriceps (Waltl, 1838)^{g}
- Rhagonycha nigricollis Motschulsky, 1849^{g}
- Rhagonycha nigripes Redtenbacher, 1842^{g}
- Rhagonycha nigritarsis Brulle, 1832^{g}
- Rhagonycha nigriventris Motschulsky, 1860^{g}
- Rhagonycha nigrohumeralis (Green, 1941)^{i g b}
- Rhagonycha nigrosuta Fiori, 1899^{g}
- Rhagonycha nitida Baudi, 1859^{g}
- Rhagonycha notaticollis Rosenhauer, 1856^{g}
- Rhagonycha opaca Mulsant, 1862^{g}
- Rhagonycha oriflava (LeConte, 1874)^{i g b}
- Rhagonycha ornaticollis Marseul, 1864^{g}
- Rhagonycha parvicollis (Green, 1941)^{i g b}
- Rhagonycha patricia Kiesenwetter, 1865^{g}
- Rhagonycha pedemontana Baudi di Selve, 1872^{g}
- Rhagonycha persica Pic, 1933^{g}
- Rhagonycha picticornis (Green, 1941)^{i g}
- Rhagonycha plagiella Marseul, 1864^{g}
- Rhagonycha proxima (Green, 1941)^{i g b}
- Rhagonycha quadricollis Kiesenwetter, 1852^{g}
- Rhagonycha querceti Kiesenwetter, 1865^{g}
- Rhagonycha rambouseki Svihla, 1993^{g}
- Rhagonycha recta (Melsheimer, 1846)^{i g b}
- Rhagonycha richteri Wittmer, 1972^{g}
- Rhagonycha rorida Kiesenwetter, 1867^{g}
- Rhagonycha rufithorax (Pic, 1906)^{i g}
- Rhagonycha sareptana Marseul, 1868^{g}
- Rhagonycha scitula (Say, 1825)^{i g b}
- Rhagonycha seiberti (Miskimen, 1956)^{i g}
- Rhagonycha septentrionis (Green, 1941)^{i g}
- Rhagonycha similata Dahlgren, 1976^{g}
- Rhagonycha straminea Kiesenwetter, 1859^{g}
- Rhagonycha striatofrons Dahlgren, 1972^{g}
- Rhagonycha sylvatica (Green, 1941)^{i g b}
- Rhagonycha taiwanonigra Wittmer, 1982^{g}
- Rhagonycha talyschensis Yablokov-Khnzorian, 1959^{g}
- Rhagonycha tantilla (LeConte, 1881)^{i g b}
- Rhagonycha tenuis (Green, 1941)^{i g b}
- Rhagonycha testacea (Linnaeus, 1758)^{g}
- Rhagonycha translucida (Krynicki, 1832)^{g}
- Rhagonycha triangulifera (Green, 1941)^{i g b}
- Rhagonycha tripunctata (Reiche, 1857)^{g}
- Rhagonycha umbrina (Green, 1941)^{i g b}
- Rhagonycha varians (Rosenhauer, 1856)
- Rhagonycha vestigialis (Green, 1941)^{i g b}
- Rhagonycha vicina Baudi, 1871^{g}
- Rhagonycha viduata (Kuester, 1854)^{g}
- Rhagonycha vilis (LeConte, 1851)^{i g b}
- Rhagonycha vitticollis Menetries, 1832^{g}
- Rhagonycha walshi (LeConte, 1881)^{i g b}

Data sources: i = ITIS, c = Catalogue of Life, g = GBIF, b = Bugguide.net
