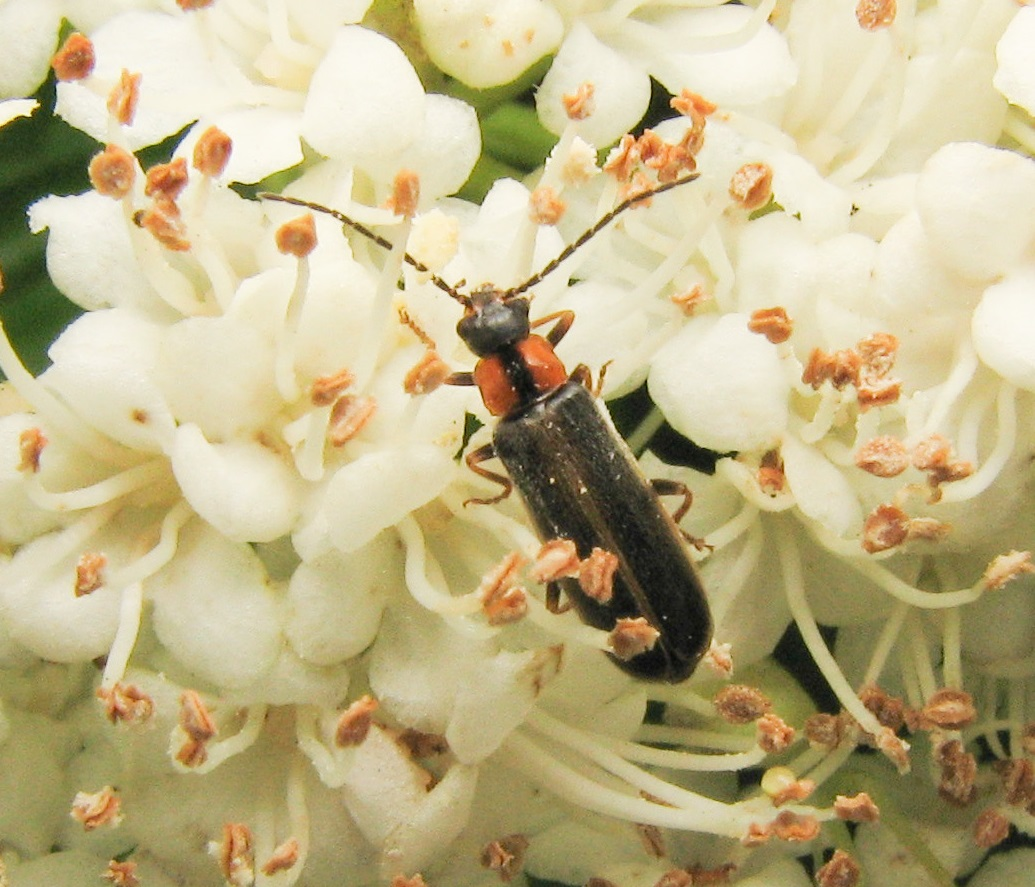

Scientific classification
- Kingdom: Animalia
- Phylum: Arthropoda
- Clade: Pancrustacea
- Class: Insecta
- Order: Coleoptera
- Suborder: Polyphaga
- Infraorder: Elateriformia
- Family: Cantharidae
- Genus: Rhagonycha
- Species: R. recta

Binomial name
- Rhagonycha recta (Melsheimer, 1846)

= Rhagonycha recta =

Species of beetle

Rhagonycha recta is a species of soldier beetle in the family Cantharidae. It is found in North America.

== Description ==
Adults of Rhagnoycha recta are somewhat variable in appearance. Typically, they are dark brown to black with yellow to yellow-brown margins on the pronotum and elytra, though a dark form with mostly or entirely black pronotum and/or elytra occurs, especially among more northern specimens. Legs may be entirely dark barring yellow knees, or may have entirely yellowish tibiae and tarsi. Antennae are 60 (in females) to 70 (in males) percent of body length, which ranges from 5 to 7 mm.

== Distribution and habitat ==
The species is found in Canada and the United States, with a preference for maple forests, forest edges, and shrubby open areas.
