= Rhagonycha mandibularis =

Scientific classification
- Kingdom: Animalia
- Phylum: Arthropoda
- Clade: Pancrustacea
- Class: Insecta
- Order: Coleoptera
- Suborder: Polyphaga
- Infraorder: Elateriformia
- Family: Cantharidae
- Genus: Rhagonycha
- Species: R. mandibularis

Binomial name
- Rhagonycha mandibularis (Kirby in Richards, 1837)

Species of beetle

Rhagonycha mandibularis is a species of soldier beetles in the family Cantharidae. It is found in North America.
