= Rhagonycha fraxini =

Scientific classification
- Kingdom: Animalia
- Phylum: Arthropoda
- Clade: Pancrustacea
- Class: Insecta
- Order: Coleoptera
- Suborder: Polyphaga
- Infraorder: Elateriformia
- Family: Cantharidae
- Genus: Rhagonycha
- Species: R. fraxini

Binomial name
- Rhagonycha fraxini (Say, 1823)

Species of beetle

Rhagonycha fraxini is a species of soldier beetle in the family Cantharidae. It is found in North America.
