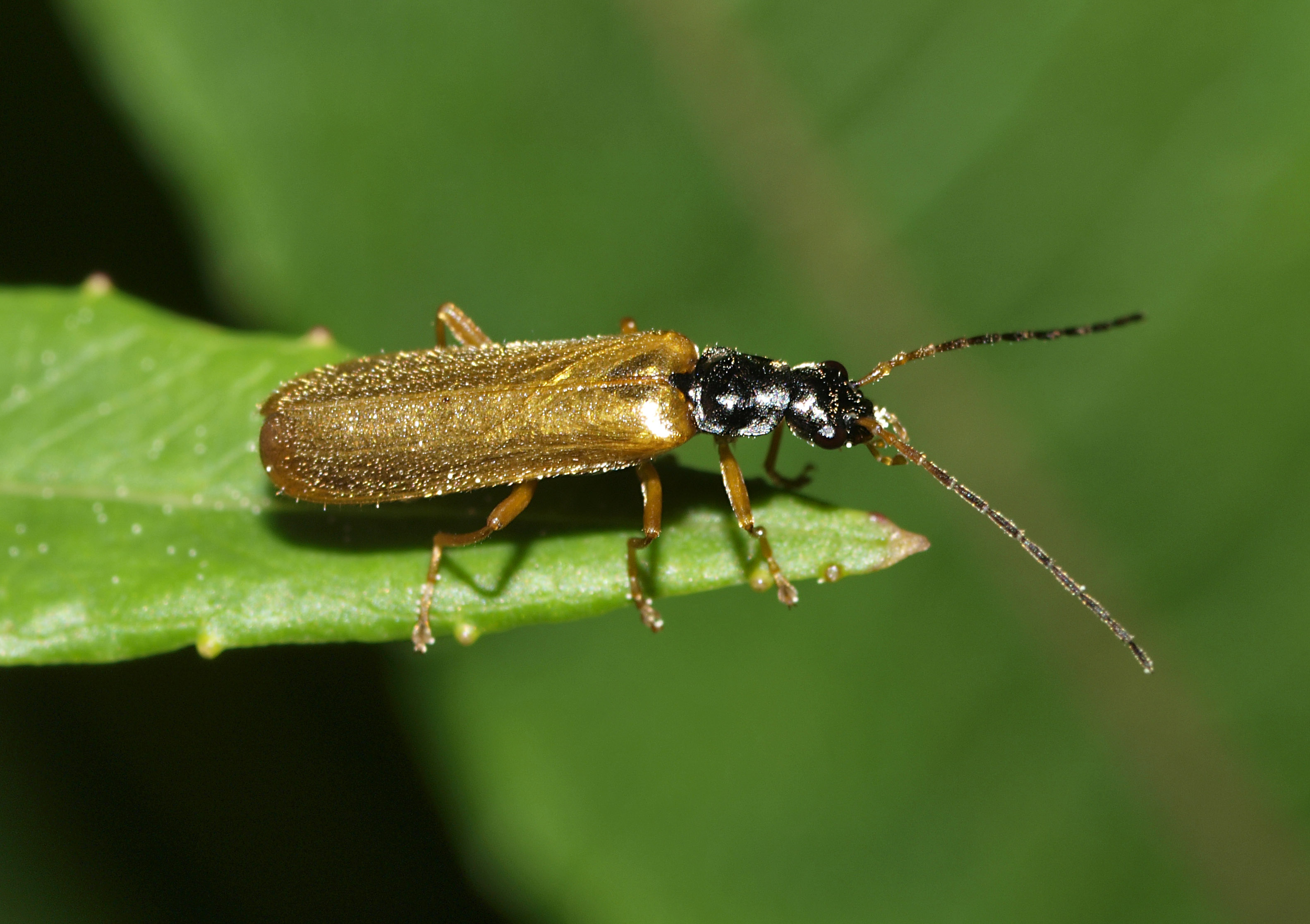
- Rhagonycha lignosa

Scientific classification
- Kingdom: Animalia
- Phylum: Arthropoda
- Clade: Pancrustacea
- Class: Insecta
- Order: Coleoptera
- Suborder: Polyphaga
- Infraorder: Elateriformia
- Family: Cantharidae
- Genus: Rhagonycha
- Species: R. lignosa

Binomial name
- Rhagonycha lignosa (Müller, 1764)

= Rhagonycha lignosa =

Species of beetle

Rhagonycha lignosa is a species of soldier beetles native to Europe.
