= Rhagonycha coloradensis =

Scientific classification
- Kingdom: Animalia
- Phylum: Arthropoda
- Clade: Pancrustacea
- Class: Insecta
- Order: Coleoptera
- Suborder: Polyphaga
- Infraorder: Elateriformia
- Family: Cantharidae
- Genus: Rhagonycha
- Species: R. coloradensis

Binomial name
- Rhagonycha coloradensis (Green, 1941)

Species of beetle

Rhagonycha coloradensis is a species of soldier beetle in the family Cantharidae. It is found in North America.
