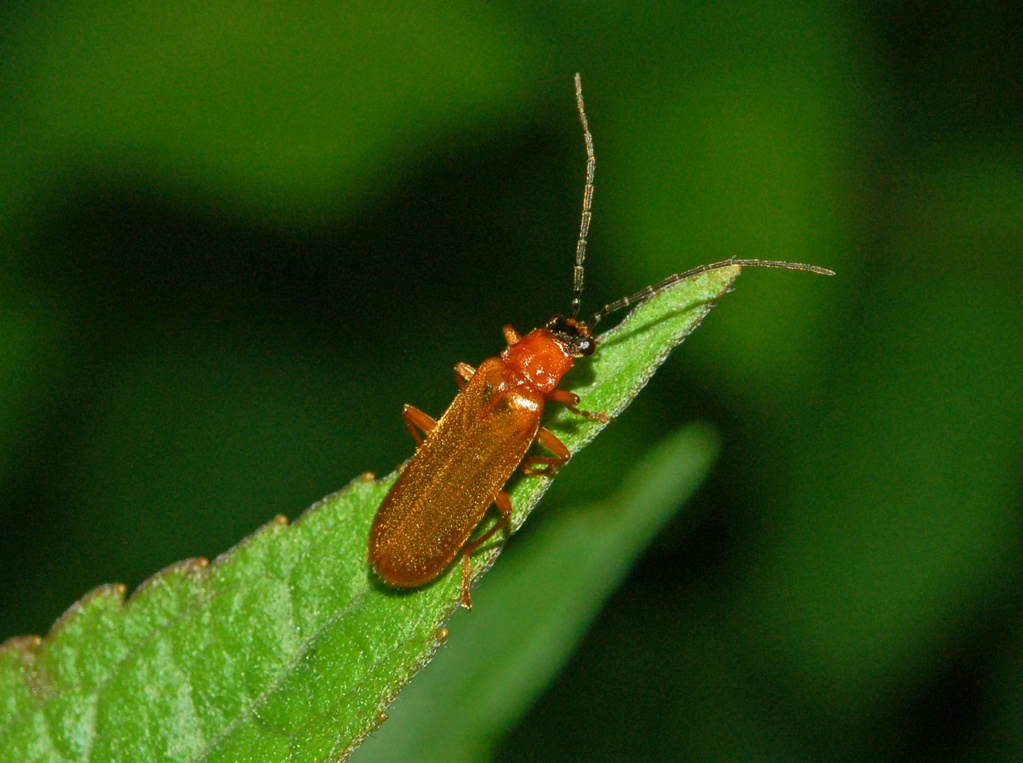

Scientific classification
- Kingdom: Animalia
- Phylum: Arthropoda
- Clade: Pancrustacea
- Class: Insecta
- Order: Coleoptera
- Suborder: Polyphaga
- Infraorder: Elateriformia
- Family: Cantharidae
- Genus: Rhagonycha
- Species: R. nigriceps

Binomial name
- Rhagonycha nigriceps (Waltl, 1838)

Synonyms
- Rhagonycha atricapilla (Kiesenwetter, 1850); Rhagonycha boops (Kiesenwetter, 1851); Rhagonycha cantabrica (Heyden, 1880); Rhagonycha forticornis (Pic, 1905)

= Rhagonycha nigriceps =

Species of beetle

Rhagonycha nigriceps is a species of soldier beetles belonging to the family Cantharidae, subfamily Cantharinae.

This beetle is mainly present in Austria, Czech Republic, France, Germany, Italy, Spain, Switzerland, and in the eastern Palearctic realm

The adults grow up to a centimetre. They are distinguished for the orange-brown colour of elytra, the red pronotum and black head (hence the specific name). This quite common beetle is active during the daylight hours, when it can be easily found on Apiaceae or Asteraceae species.
