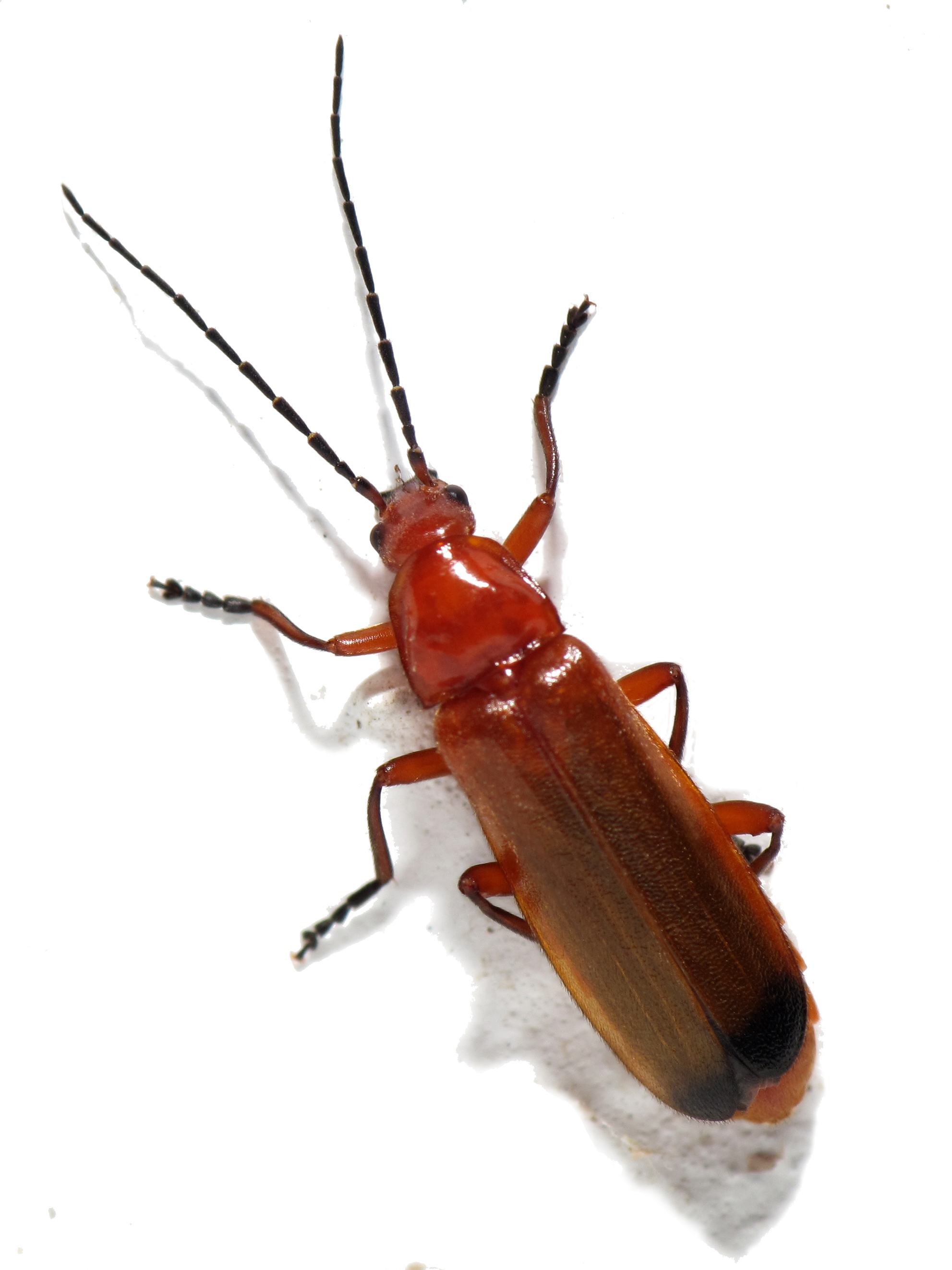

Scientific classification
- Kingdom: Animalia
- Phylum: Arthropoda
- Clade: Pancrustacea
- Class: Insecta
- Order: Coleoptera
- Suborder: Polyphaga
- Infraorder: Elateriformia
- Family: Cantharidae
- Subfamily: Cantharinae
- Tribe: Cantharini
- Genus: Rhagonycha
- Species: R. fulva

Binomial name
- Rhagonycha fulva (Scopoli, 1763)

Synonyms
- List: Telephorus bimaculatus DeGeer, 1774; Rhagonycha cailloli Chobaut, 1914; Rhagonycha curtithorax Pic, 1920; Cicindela maculata Fourcroy, 1785; Telephorus melanurus Olivier, 1790; Rhagonycha terminalis Redtenbacher, 1849

= Rhagonycha fulva =

Species of beetle

Rhagonycha fulva in copula

Rhagonycha fulva, the common red soldier beetle, also misleadingly known as the bloodsucker beetle, and popularly known in England as the hogweed bonking beetle is a species of soldier beetle (Cantharidae).

== Taxonomy ==
Rhagonycha fulva was first described by Giovanni Antonio Scopoli in 1763 in Entomologia Carniolica as Cantharis fulva.

== Description ==
Rhagonycha fulva measures 8–10 millimetres (0.31–0.39 in) in length. Its antennae are black, occasionally the first segment is orange. The head and pronotum are orange and shiny, with fine pubescence visible on the head. The shape of the pronotum is variable, but it narrows towards the head. The elytra cover the wings and most of the abdomen and are a dark shiny red, and terminate in a clearly visible black patch on the apical end – this is one of the key identifying features. The femora and tibiae are orange, but the tarsi are black; the third segment of the tarsi is simple rather than bilobed.

All soldier beetles are soft-bodied, resulting in the German name of this species as Roter Weichkäfer (meaning "red soft beetle").

== Distribution ==
This beetle is very common in Europe and Anatolia. Introduced to North America, it is well established in British Columbia and Quebec and recently recorded in Ontario.

== Life cycle ==
Adults feed on aphids, and eat pollen and nectar. Larvae prey on ground-dwelling invertebrates, such as slugs and snails, and live at the base of long grasses. The adults, which are active between June and August, spend much of their short lives mating and can often be seen in pairs.

== Behaviour ==
Rhagonycha fulva is commonly found on open-structured flowers and can be spotted in grassland, woodland, along hedgerows and in parks and gardens, often on flower species such as Anthriscus sylvestris (Cow Parsley) and others of the genus Heracleum (Hogweed) and the family Asteraceae during the summer. R. fulva is a significant pollinator of two species of Hogweed, Heracleum sphondylium, and H. mantegazzianum.

== Gallery ==
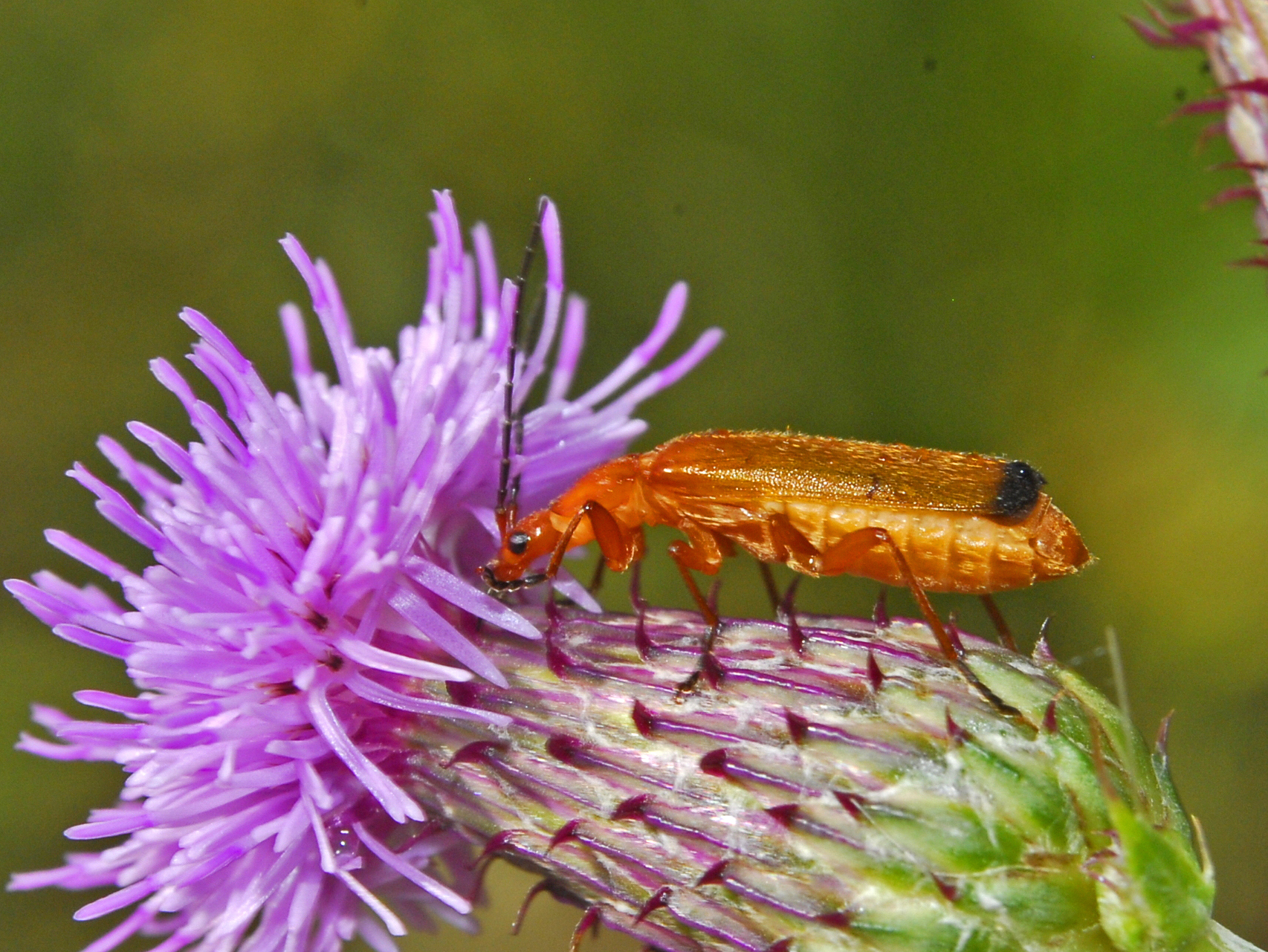
R. fulva. Side view

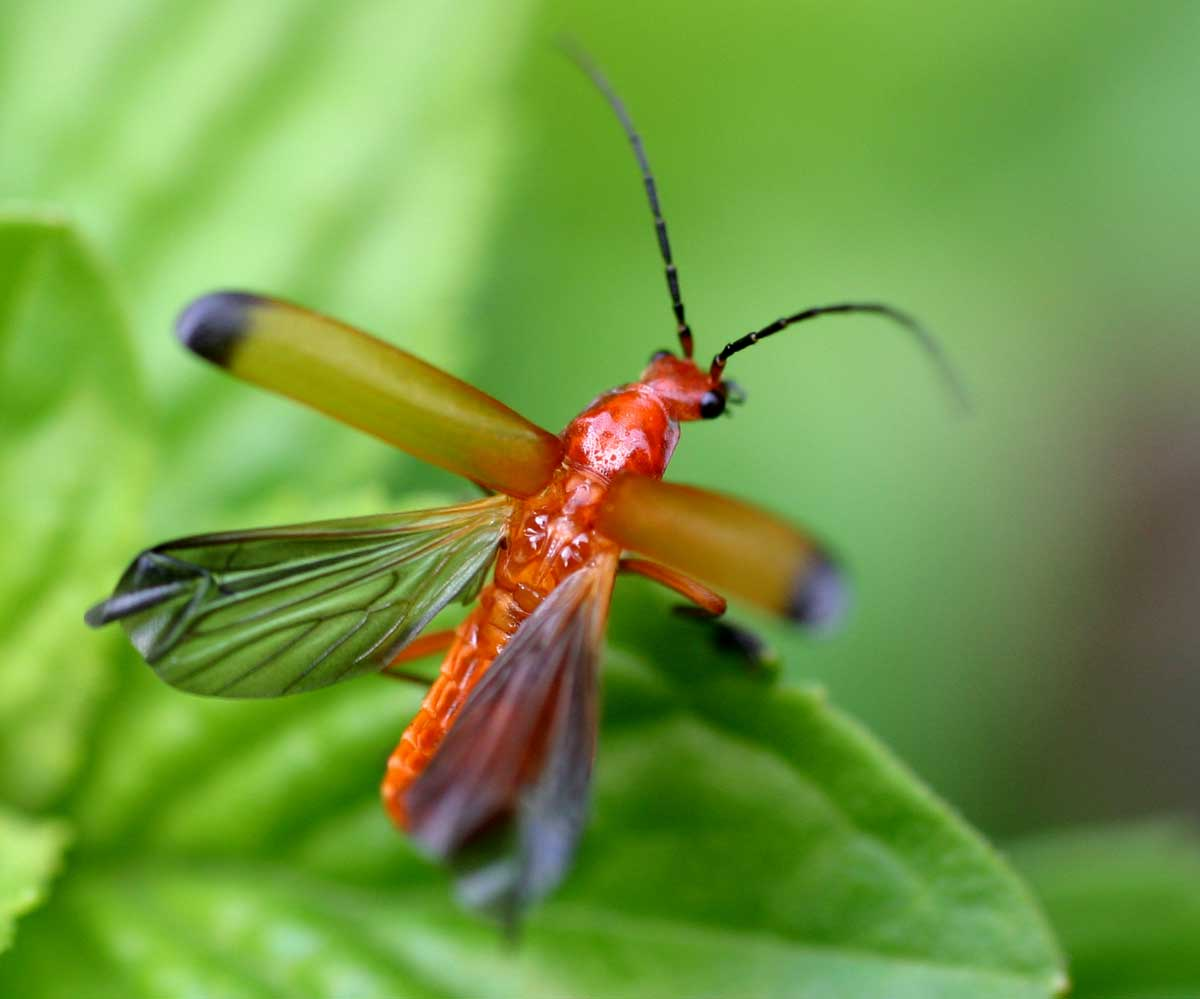
Take off

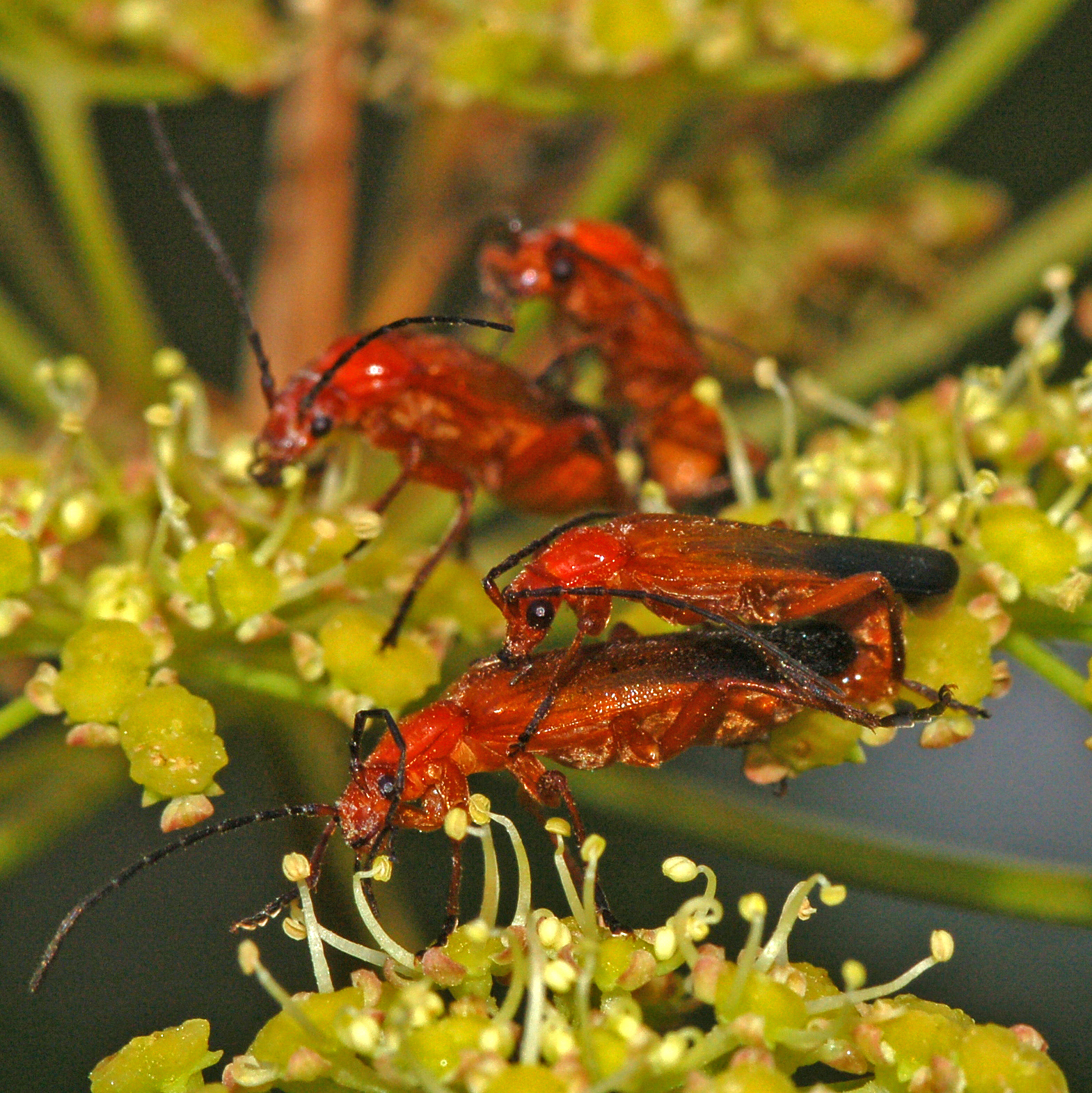
Mating season

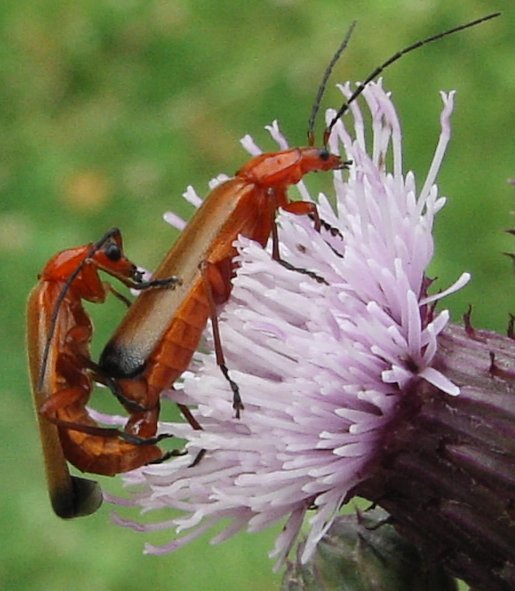
Mating on thistle

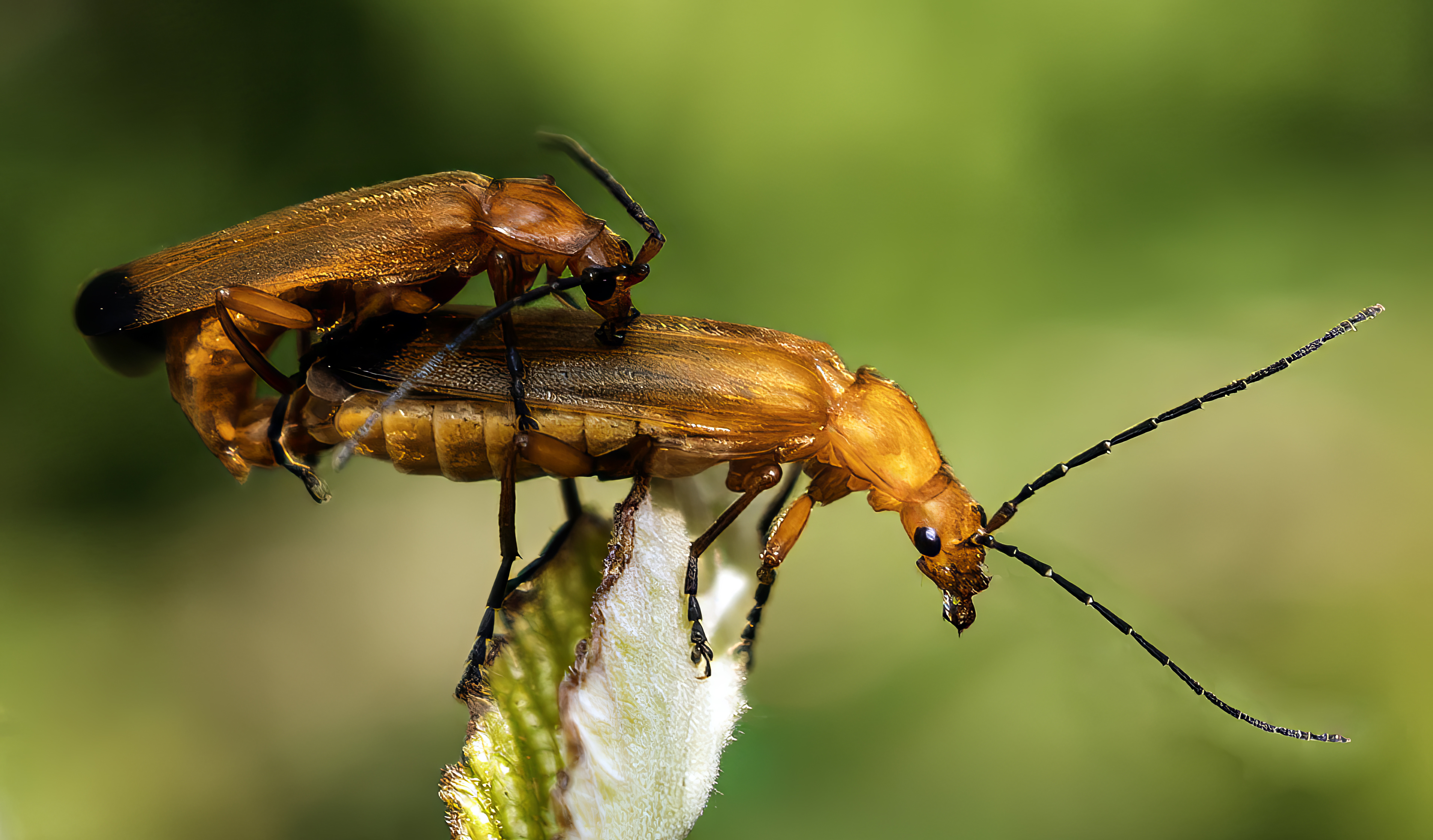
Mating on elmleaf blackberry.

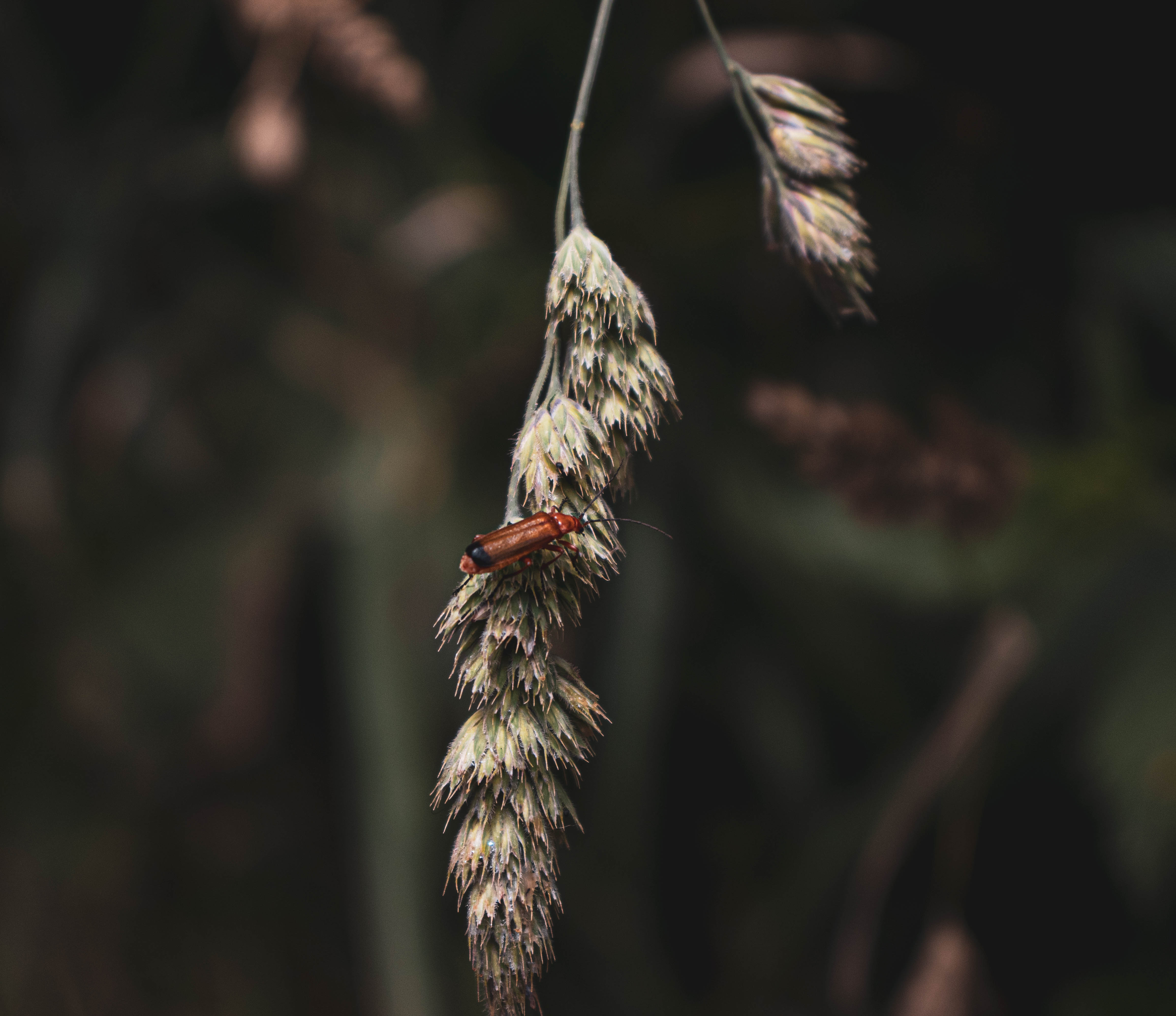
Common red soldier beetle on leaf

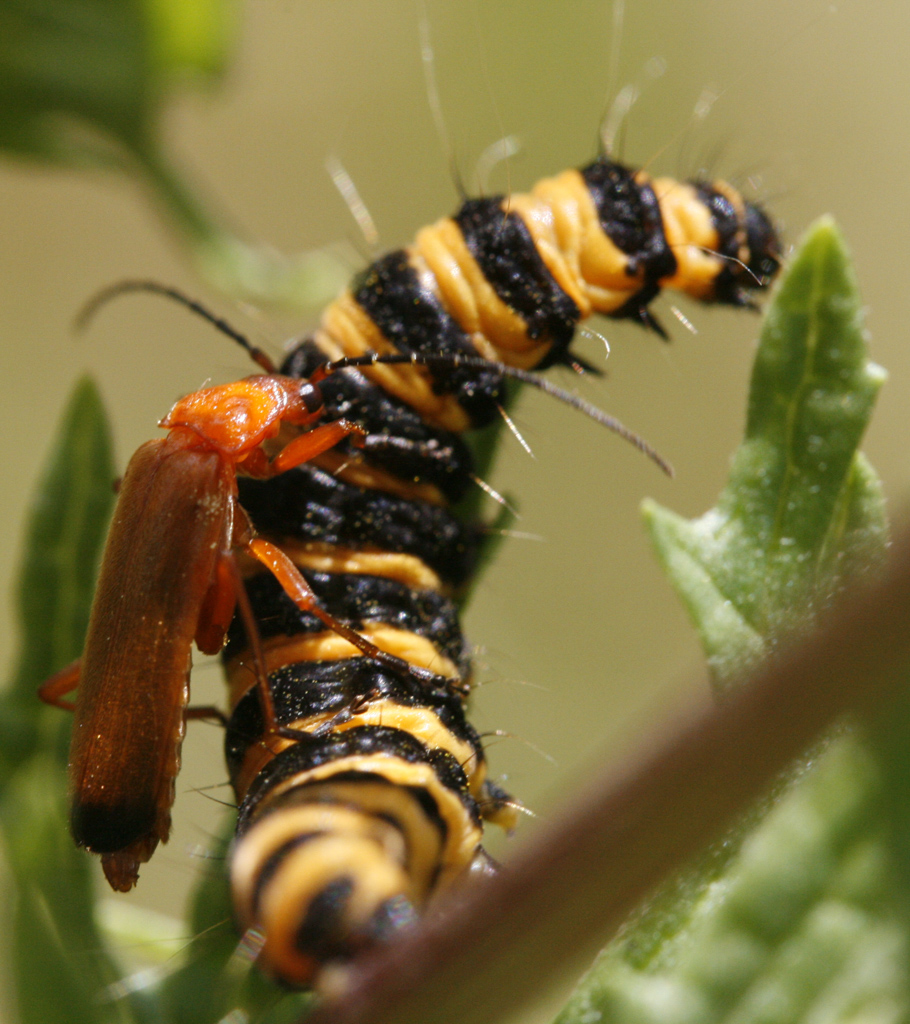
Rhagonycha fulva predating on Tyria jacobeae

R. fulva grooming an antenna
