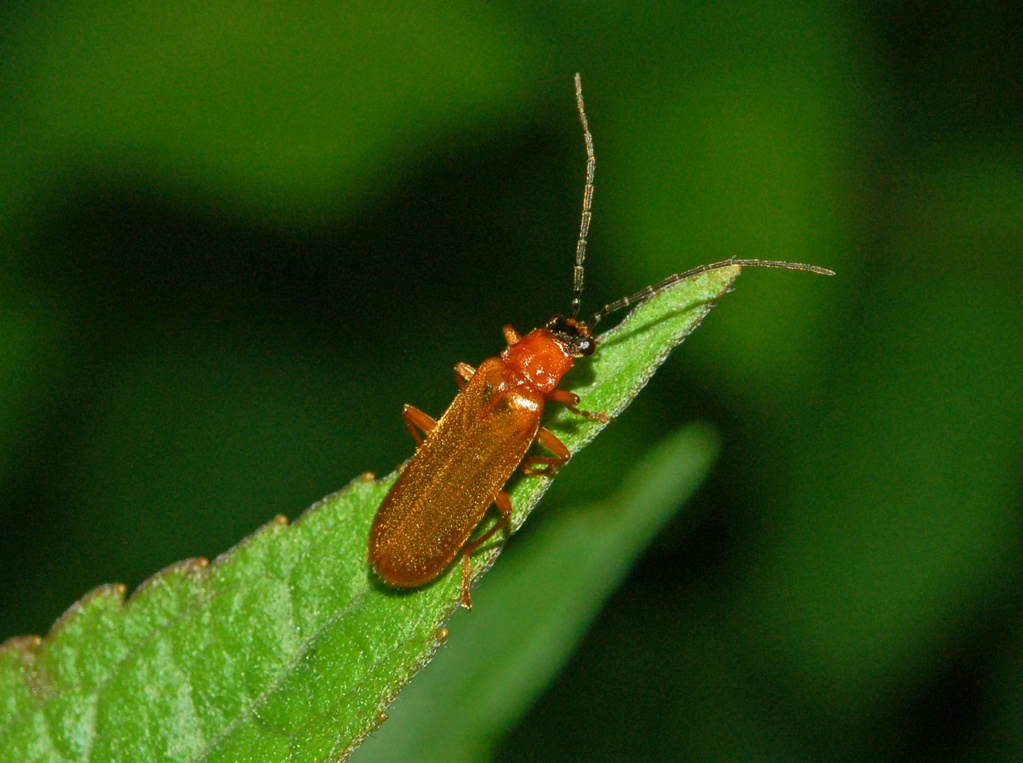
- Rhagonycha nigriceps

Scientific classification
- Kingdom: Animalia
- Phylum: Arthropoda
- Clade: Pancrustacea
- Class: Insecta
- Order: Coleoptera
- Suborder: Polyphaga
- Infraorder: Elateriformia
- Family: Cantharidae
- Subfamily: Cantharinae
- Tribe: Cantharini
- Genus: Rhagonycha; Eschscholtz, 1830

Synonyms
- Ragonycha

= Rhagonycha =

Genus of beetles

Rhagonycha limbata

Rhagonycha is a genus of soldier beetle belonging to the family Cantharidae. There are at least 140 described species recorded from Europe, North America and Japan, and thought to date from the Upper Eocene to recent periods.

== Subgenera and notable species ==
BioLib lists two subgenera:

- subgenus Rhagonycha Eschscholtz, 1830
  - Rhagonycha fulva (Scopoli, 1763) - the common red soldier beetle is the type species (as Cantharis fulva Scopoli, 1763, misidentified as C. melanura L., 1758)
  - Rhagonycha testacea (Linnaeus, 1758)
  - List of other Rhagonycha species
- subgenus Ussurycha Kazantsev, 1995 (monotypic)
  - Rhagonycha kazantsevi Svihla, 1995
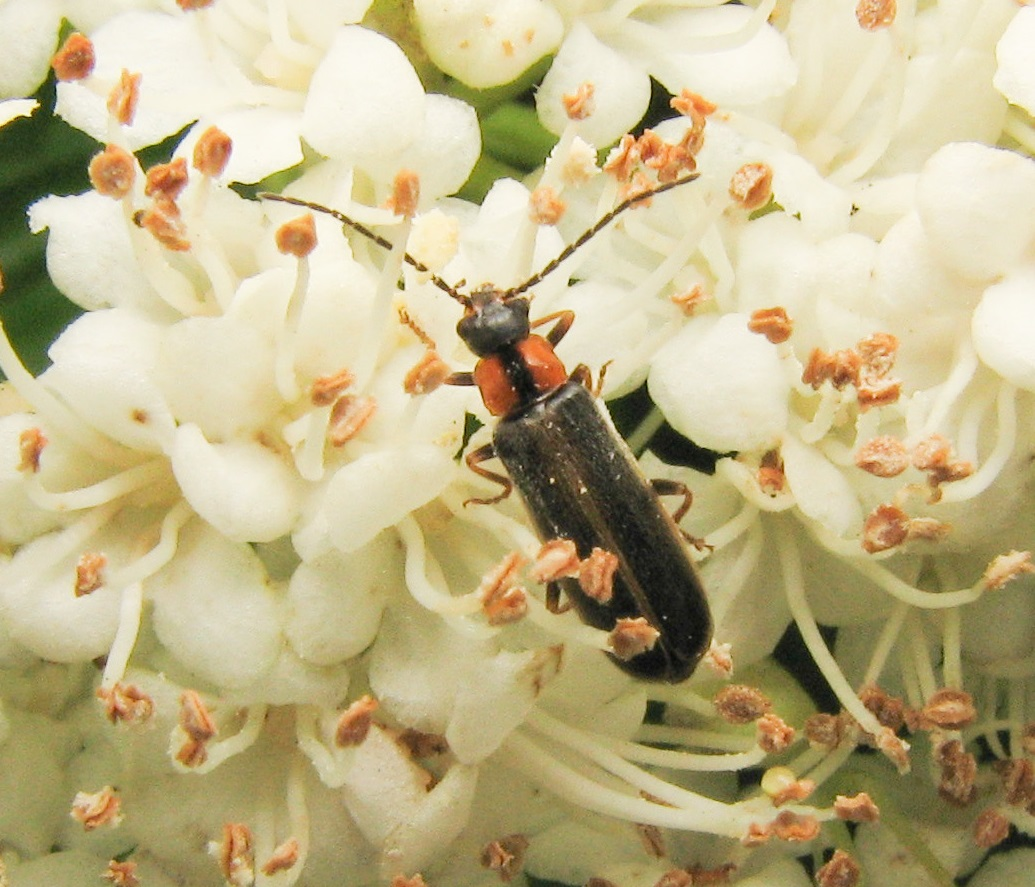
Rhagonycha recta

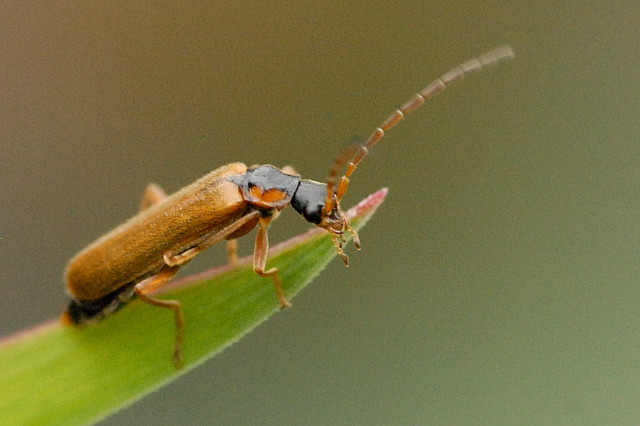
Rhagonycha testacea
