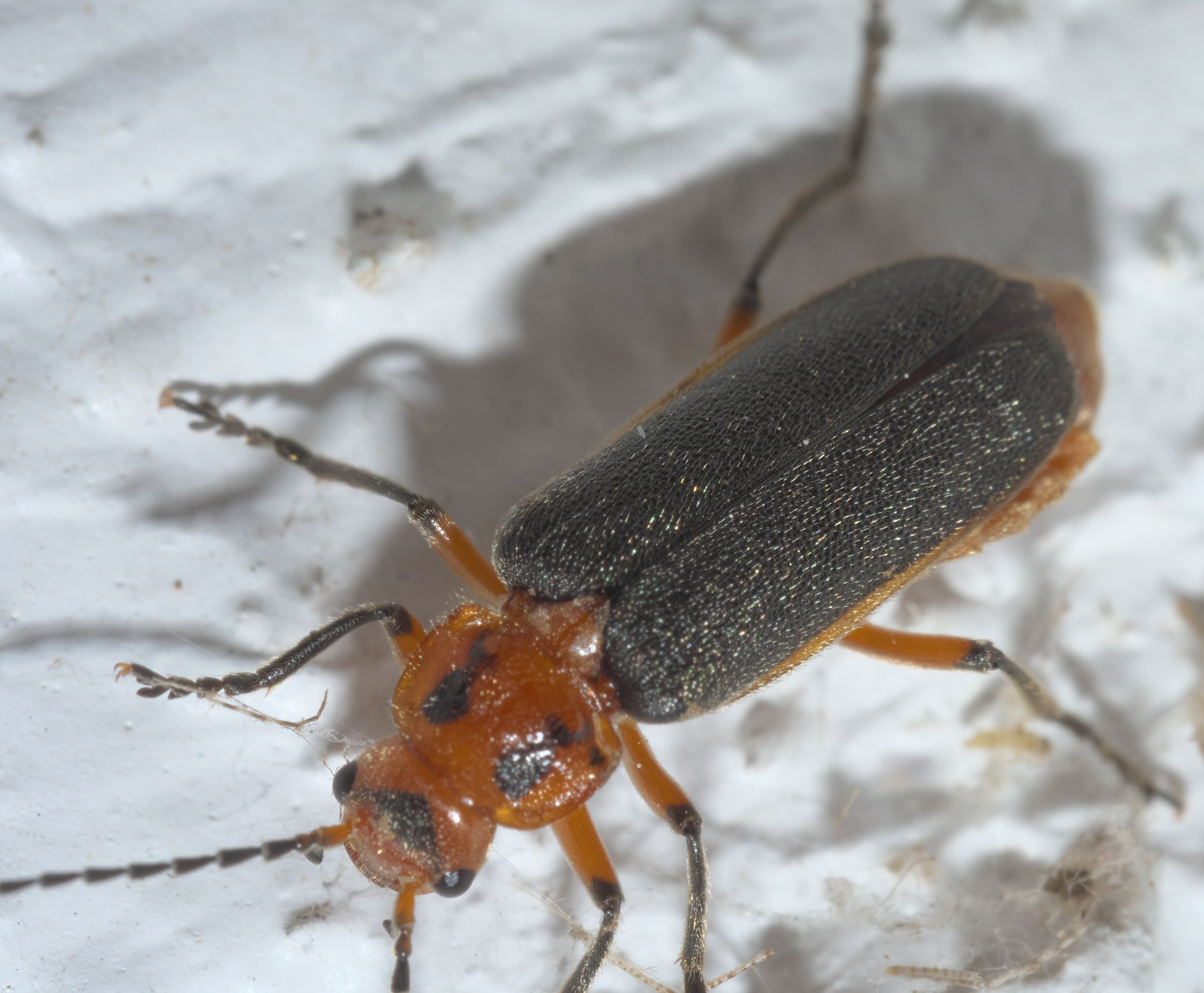

Scientific classification
- Domain: Eukaryota
- Kingdom: Animalia
- Phylum: Arthropoda
- Class: Insecta
- Order: Coleoptera
- Suborder: Polyphaga
- Infraorder: Elateriformia
- Family: Cantharidae
- Genus: Atalantycha
- Species: A. bilineata

Binomial name
- Atalantycha bilineata (Say, 1823)

= Atalantycha bilineata =

Species of beetle

Atalantycha bilineata, known generally as the two-lined cantharid or two-lined leather-wing, is a species of soldier beetle in the family Cantharidae. It is found in North America.

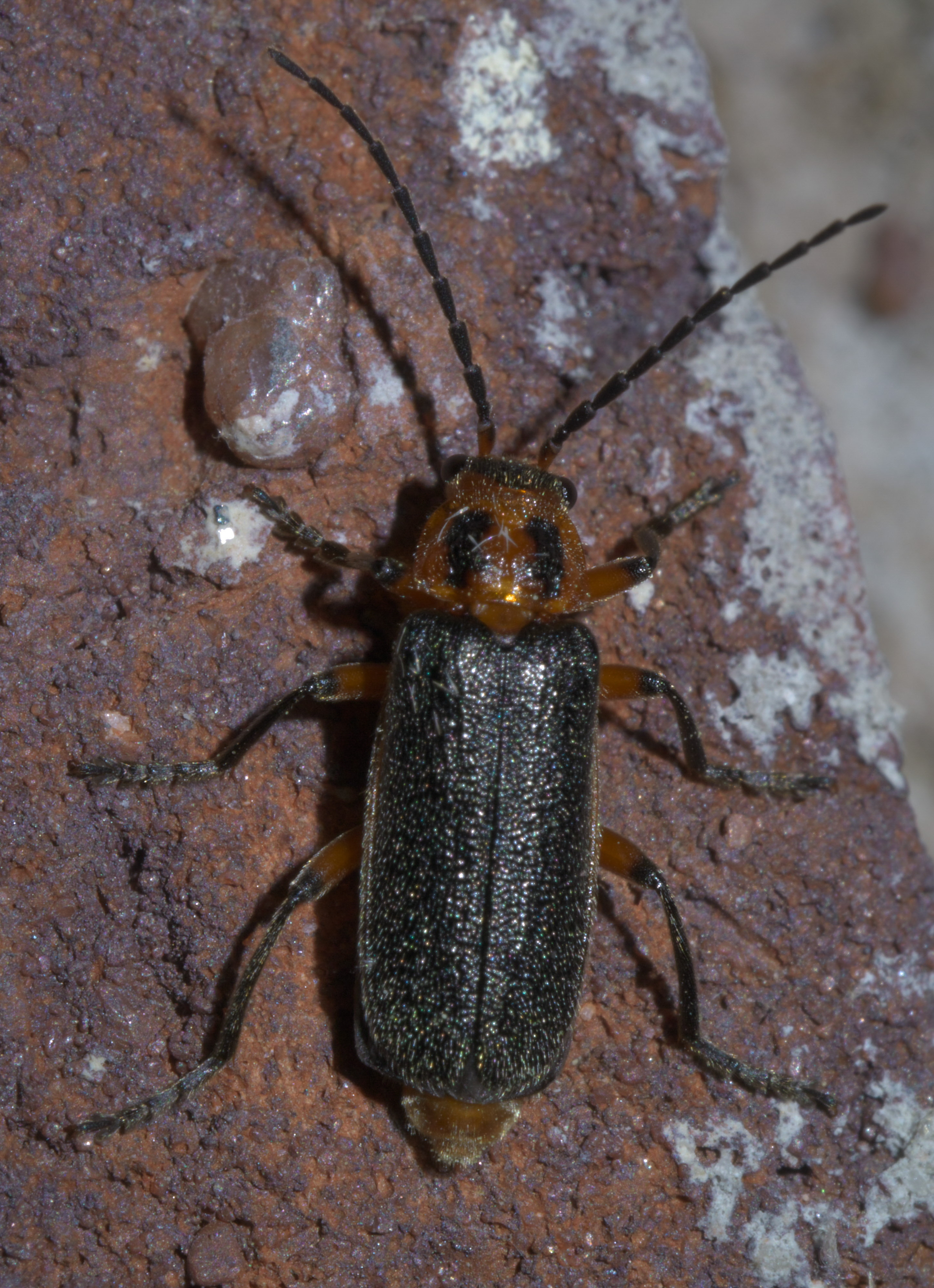
Two-lined cantharid, Atalantycha bilineata

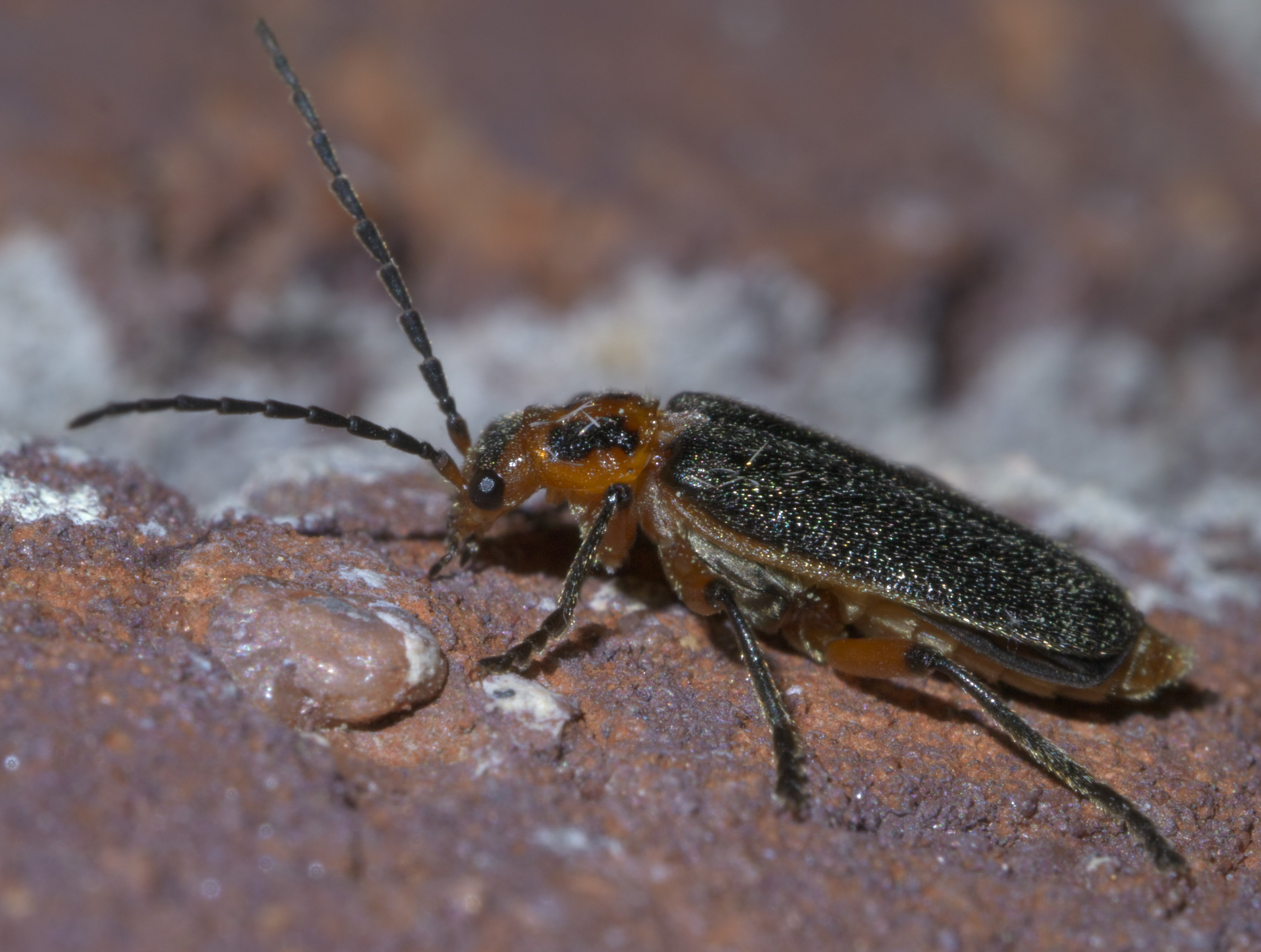
Two-lined cantharid, Atalantycha bilineata
