= Atalantycha dentigera =

Scientific classification
- Domain: Eukaryota
- Kingdom: Animalia
- Phylum: Arthropoda
- Class: Insecta
- Order: Coleoptera
- Suborder: Polyphaga
- Infraorder: Elateriformia
- Family: Cantharidae
- Genus: Atalantycha
- Species: A. dentigera

Binomial name
- Atalantycha dentigera (LeConte, 1851)

Species of beetle

Atalantycha dentigera is a species of soldier beetle in the family Cantharidae. It is found in North America.
