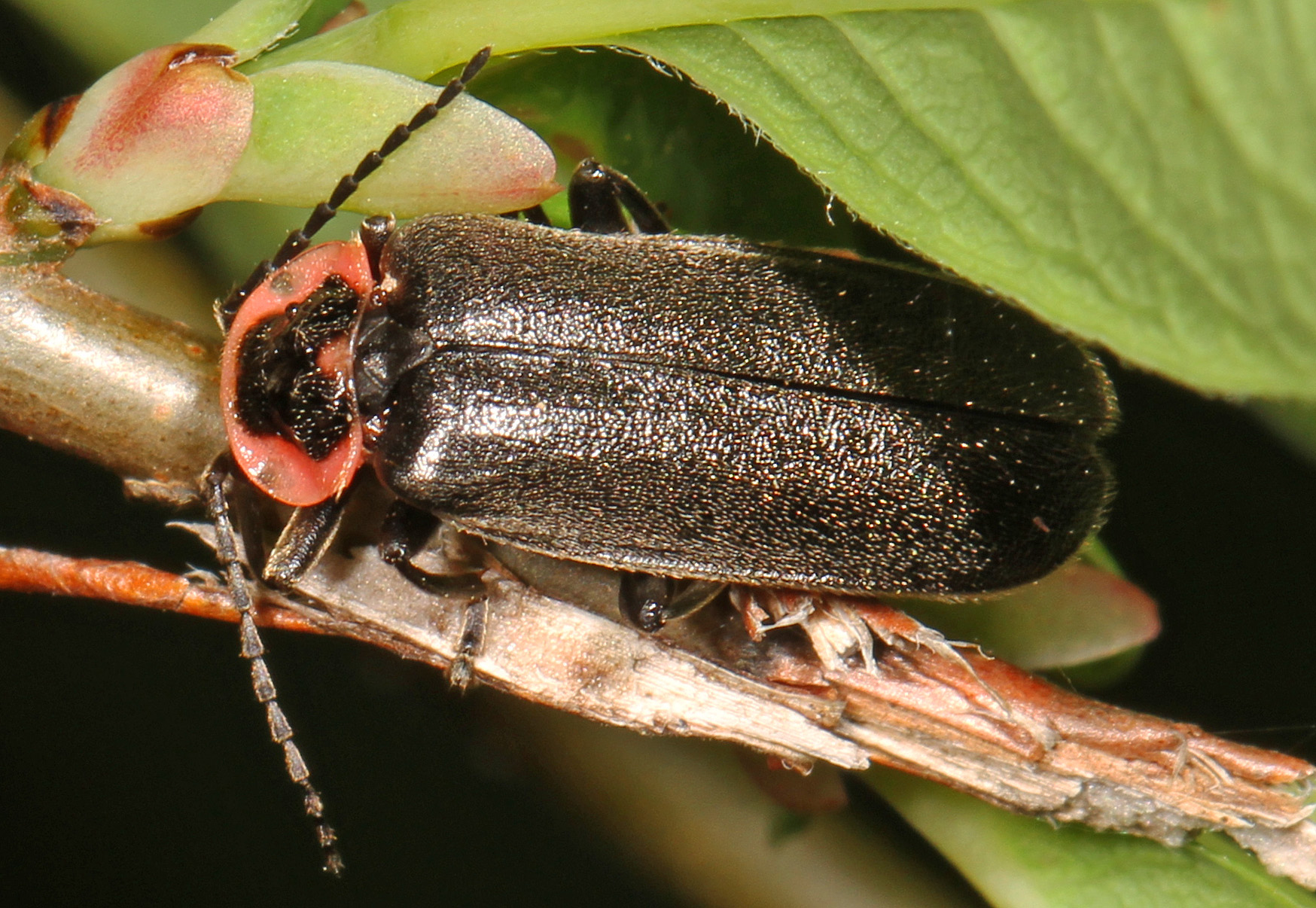

Scientific classification
- Kingdom: Animalia
- Phylum: Arthropoda
- Clade: Pancrustacea
- Class: Insecta
- Order: Coleoptera
- Suborder: Polyphaga
- Infraorder: Elateriformia
- Family: Cantharidae
- Genus: Atalantycha
- Species: A. neglecta

Binomial name
- Atalantycha neglecta (Fall, 1919)

= Atalantycha neglecta =

Species of beetle

Atalantycha neglecta, the neglected soldier beetle, is a species of soldier beetle in the family Cantharidae. It is largely found in the United States, with its northern range extending to Ontario and Quebec.
