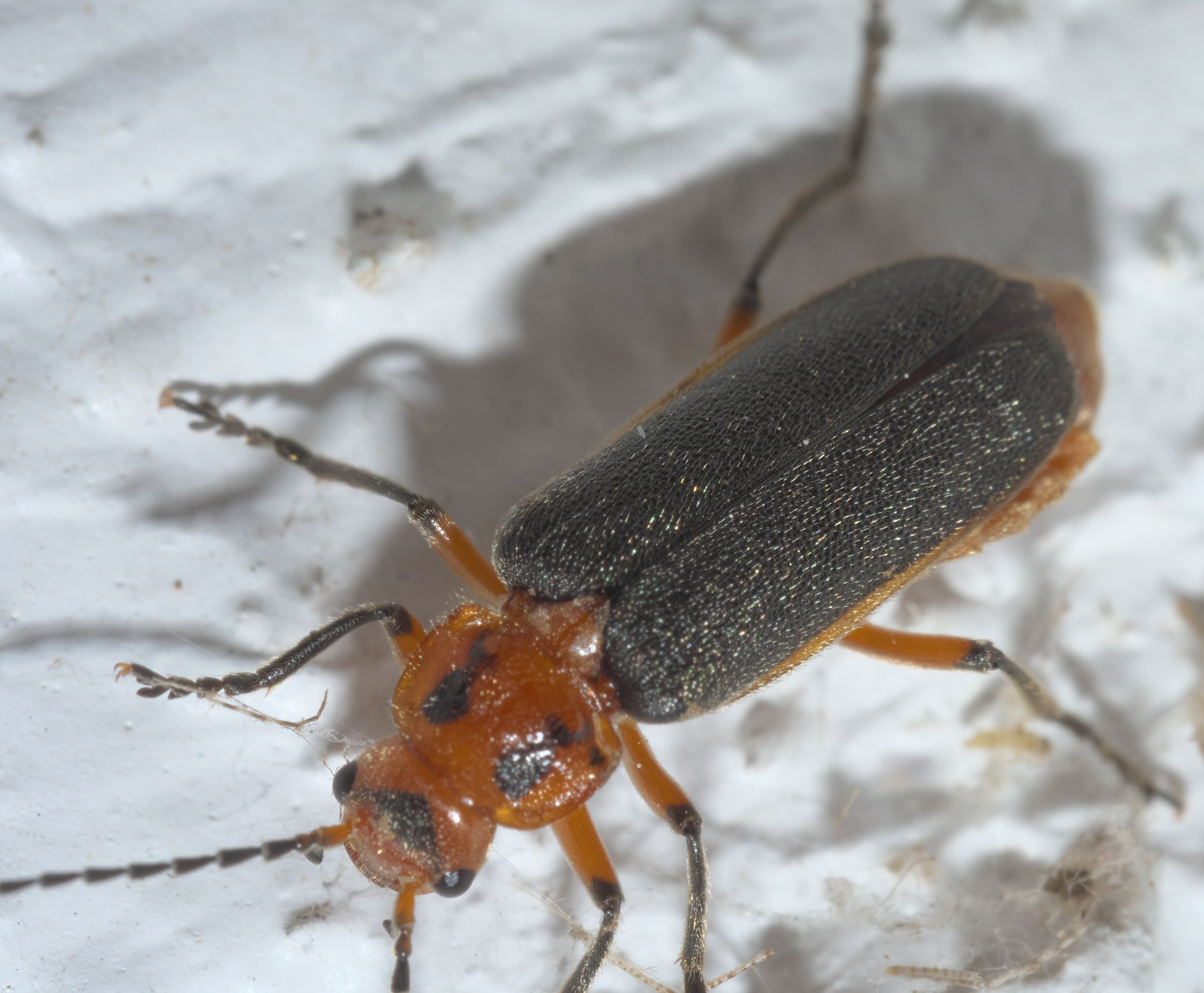
- Atalantycha bilineata

Scientific classification
- Domain: Eukaryota
- Kingdom: Animalia
- Phylum: Arthropoda
- Class: Insecta
- Order: Coleoptera
- Suborder: Polyphaga
- Infraorder: Elateriformia
- Family: Cantharidae
- Tribe: Cantharini
- Genus: Atalantycha; Kazantsev, 2005

= Atalantycha =

Genus of beetles

Atalantycha is a genus of soldier beetles in the family Cantharidae. There are at least four described species in Atalantycha.

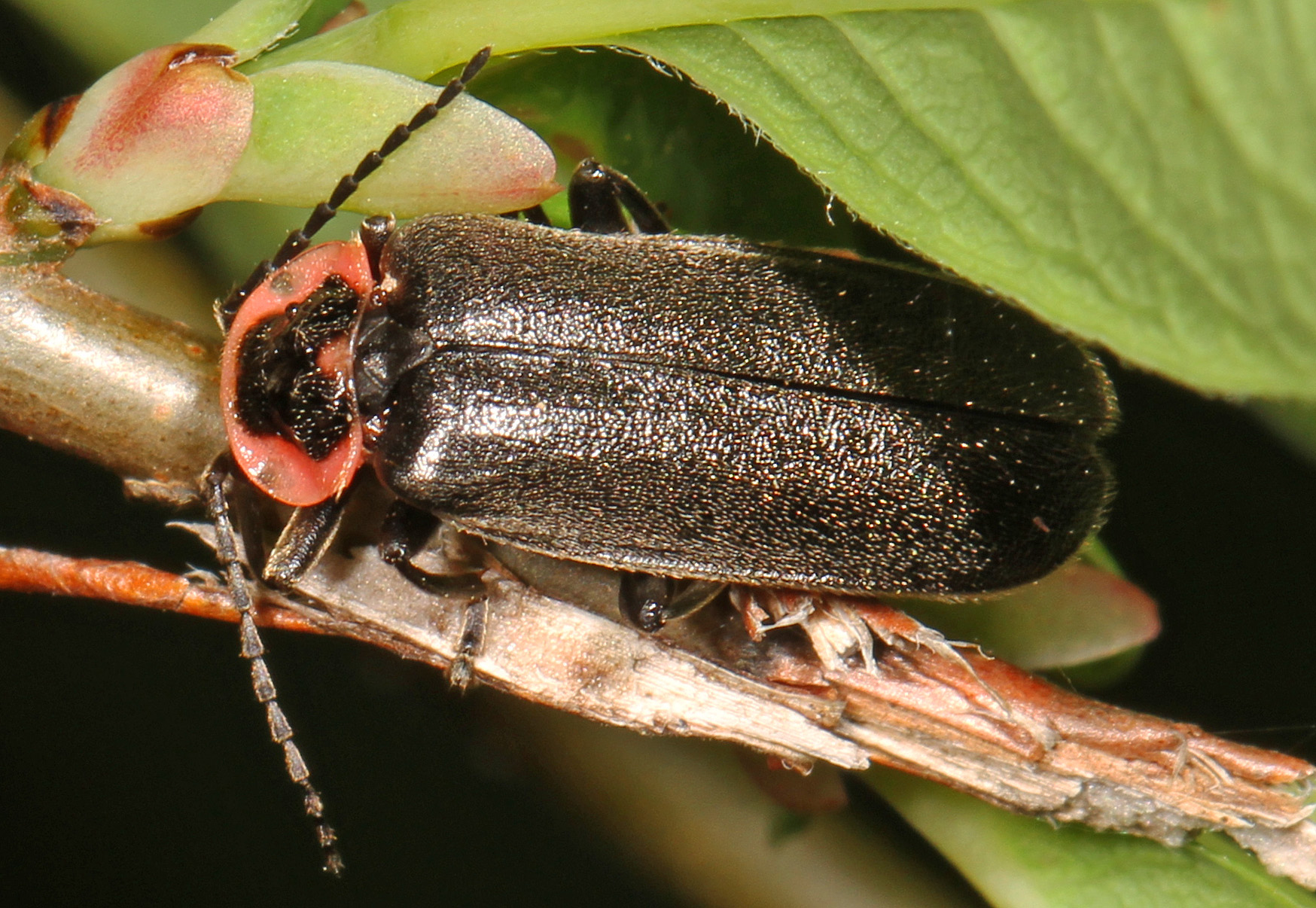
Atalantycha neglecta

== Species ==
These four species belong to the genus Atalantycha:

- Atalantycha bilineata (Say, 1823) (two-lined cantharid)
- Atalantycha dentigera (LeConte, 1851)
- Atalantycha humata (Wickham, 1913)
- Atalantycha neglecta (Fall, 1919)
