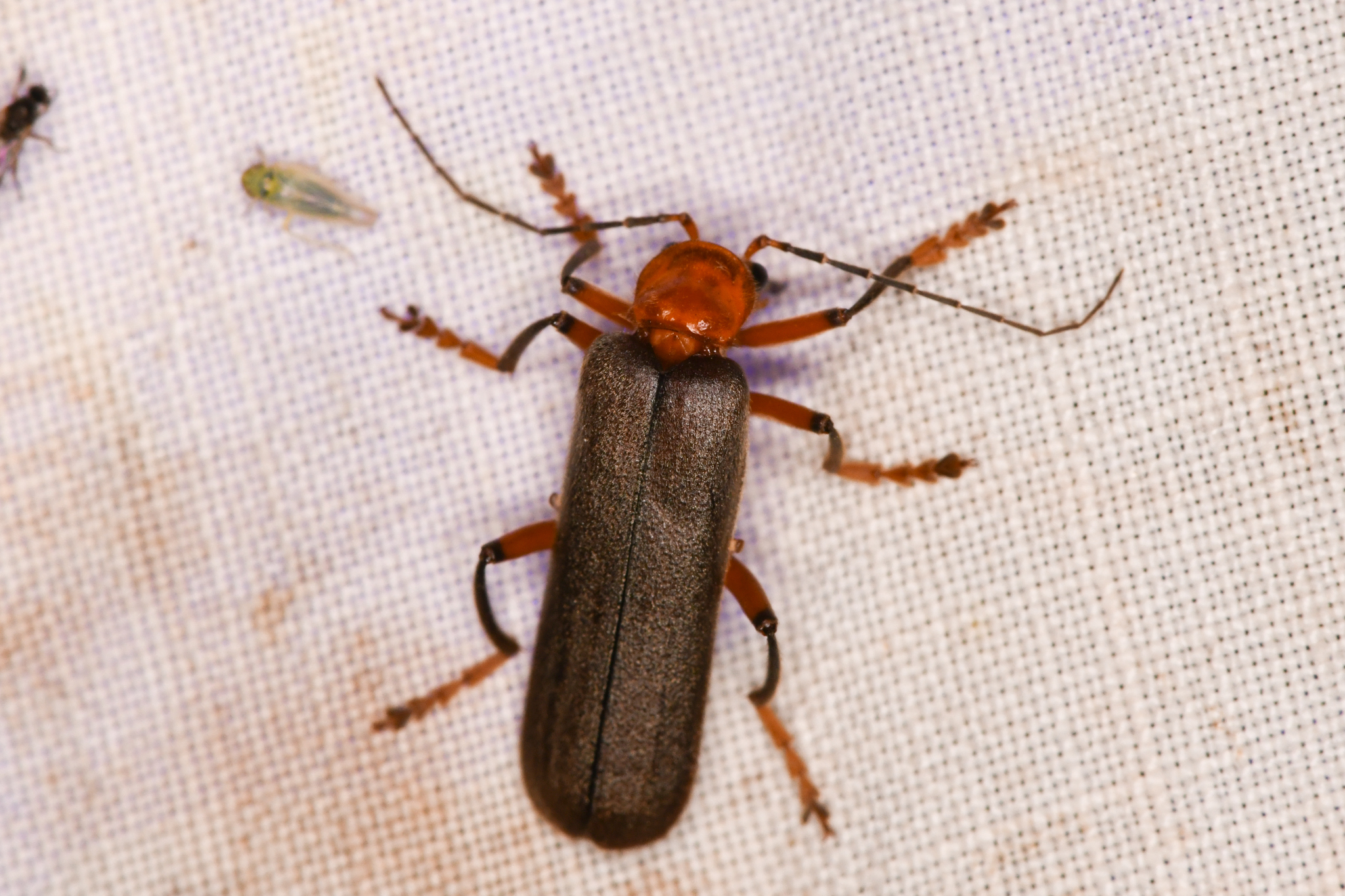
- Pacificanthia consors

Scientific classification
- Kingdom: Animalia
- Phylum: Arthropoda
- Class: Insecta
- Order: Coleoptera
- Suborder: Polyphaga
- Infraorder: Elateriformia
- Family: Cantharidae
- Tribe: Cantharini
- Genus: Pacificanthia; Kazantsev, 2001

= Pacificanthia =

Genus of beetles

Pacificanthia is a genus of soldier beetles in the family Cantharidae. There are at least four described species in Pacificanthia.

== Species ==
These four species belong to the genus Pacificanthia:

- Pacificanthia consors (LeConte, 1851)
- Pacificanthia curtisi (Kirby, 1837)
- Pacificanthia downiei Kazantsev, 2001
- Pacificanthia rotundicollis (Say, 1825)
