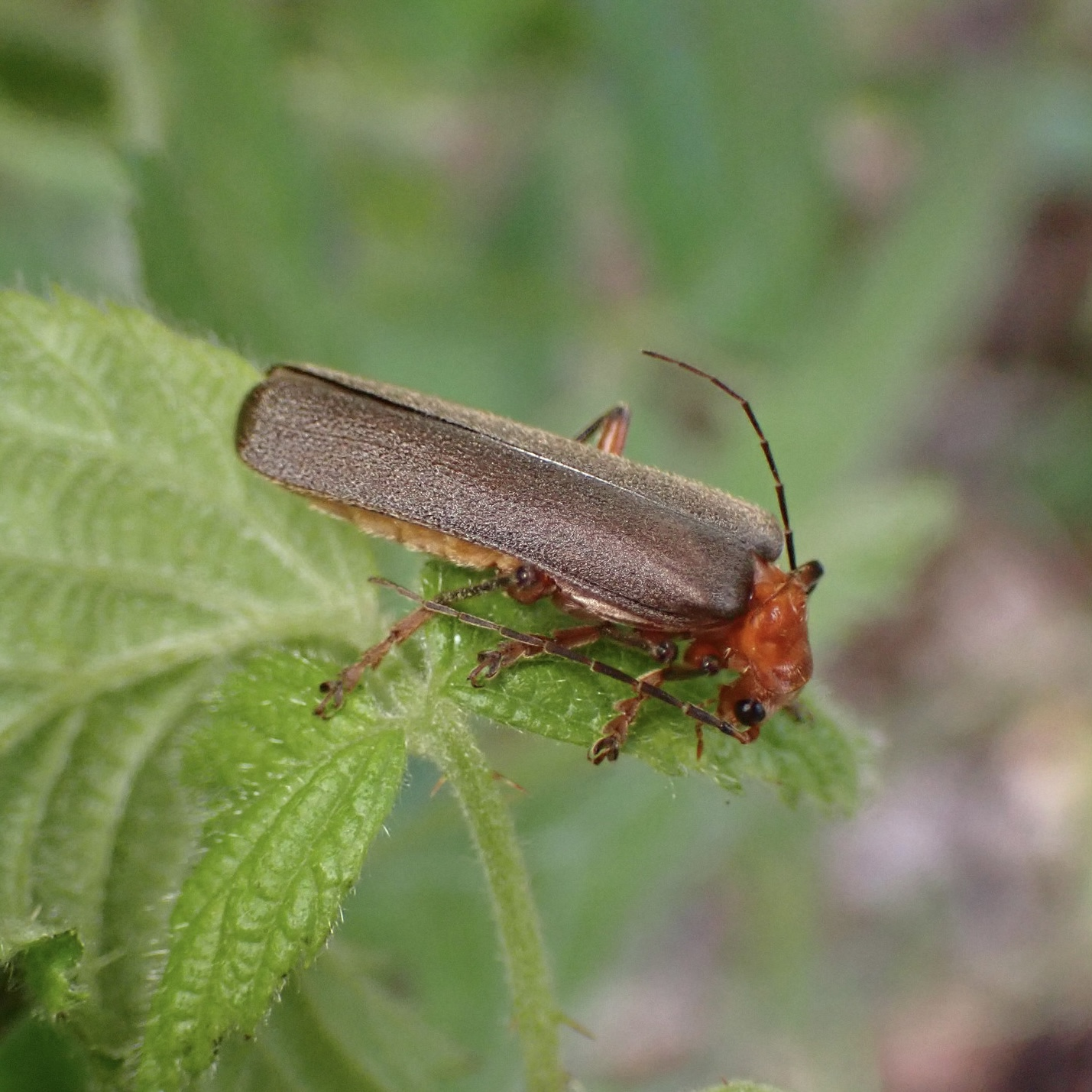

Scientific classification
- Domain: Eukaryota
- Kingdom: Animalia
- Phylum: Arthropoda
- Class: Insecta
- Order: Coleoptera
- Suborder: Polyphaga
- Infraorder: Elateriformia
- Family: Cantharidae
- Genus: Pacificanthia
- Species: P. consors

Binomial name
- Pacificanthia consors (LeConte, 1851)

= Pacificanthia consors =

Species of beetle

Pacificanthia consors, also known as the brown leatherwing beetle, is a species of soldier beetle in the family Cantharidae. It is found in North America, mainly in California. Adults are 14-19 mm in length. They are orange with brown wing covers, and the legs are reddish with black markings. Adults are mostly commonly on the wing in April and May. Adult beetles and their larva both spend most of their time in plant litter where they prey on other soil fauna.
