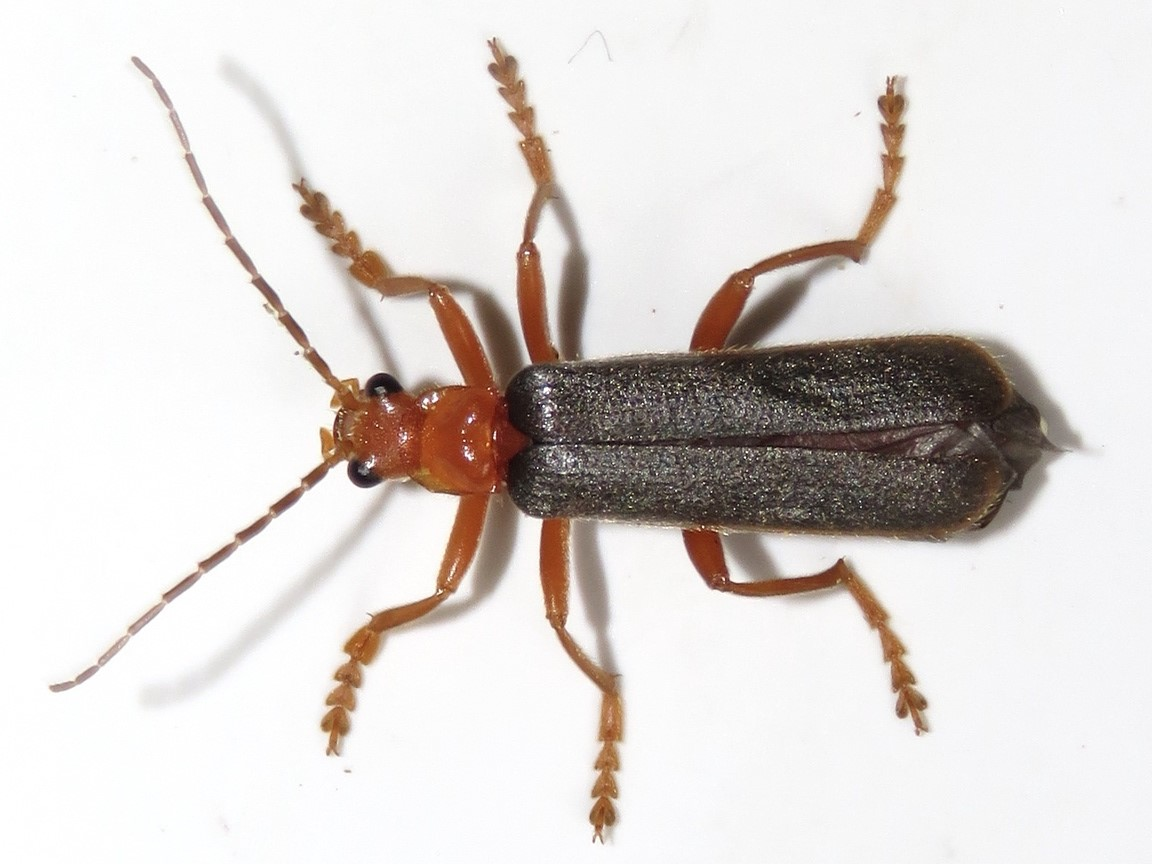

Scientific classification
- Domain: Eukaryota
- Kingdom: Animalia
- Phylum: Arthropoda
- Class: Insecta
- Order: Coleoptera
- Suborder: Polyphaga
- Infraorder: Elateriformia
- Family: Cantharidae
- Genus: Pacificanthia
- Species: P. rotundicollis

Binomial name
- Pacificanthia rotundicollis (Say, 1825)

Synonyms
- Cantharis rotundicollis Say, 1825

= Pacificanthia rotundicollis =

Species of beetle

Pacificanthia rotundicollis is a species of soldier beetle in the family Cantharidae. It is found in North America.
