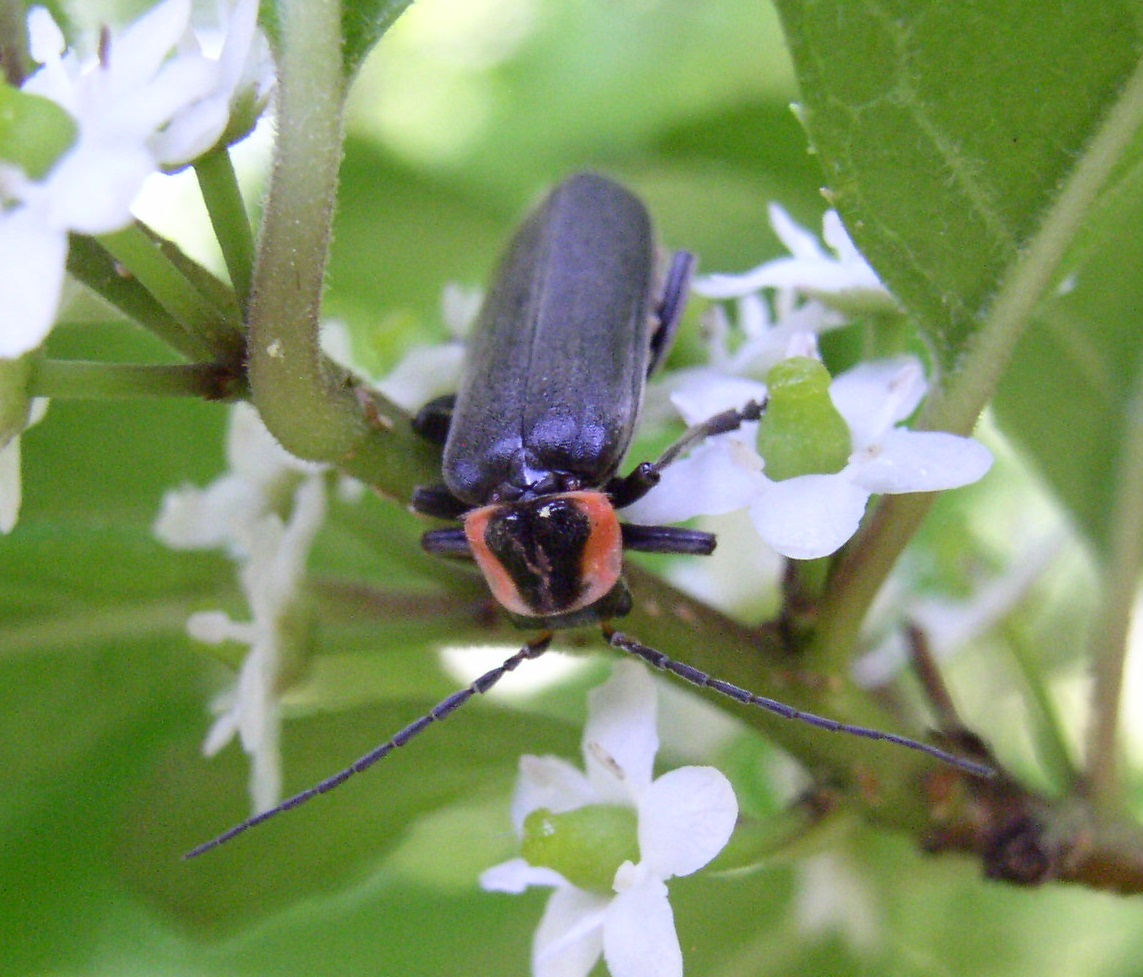
- Rhaxonycha carolina

Scientific classification
- Kingdom: Animalia
- Phylum: Arthropoda
- Class: Insecta
- Order: Coleoptera
- Suborder: Polyphaga
- Infraorder: Elateriformia
- Family: Cantharidae
- Tribe: Cantharini
- Genus: Rhaxonycha; Motschulsky, 1860

= Rhaxonycha =

Genus of beetles

Rhaxonycha is a genus of soldier beetles in the family Cantharidae. There are at least two described species in Rhaxonycha.

== Species ==
These two species belong to the genus Rhaxonycha:

- Rhaxonycha bilobata McKey-Fender, 1941
- Rhaxonycha carolina (Fabricius, 1801) (Carolina cantharid)
