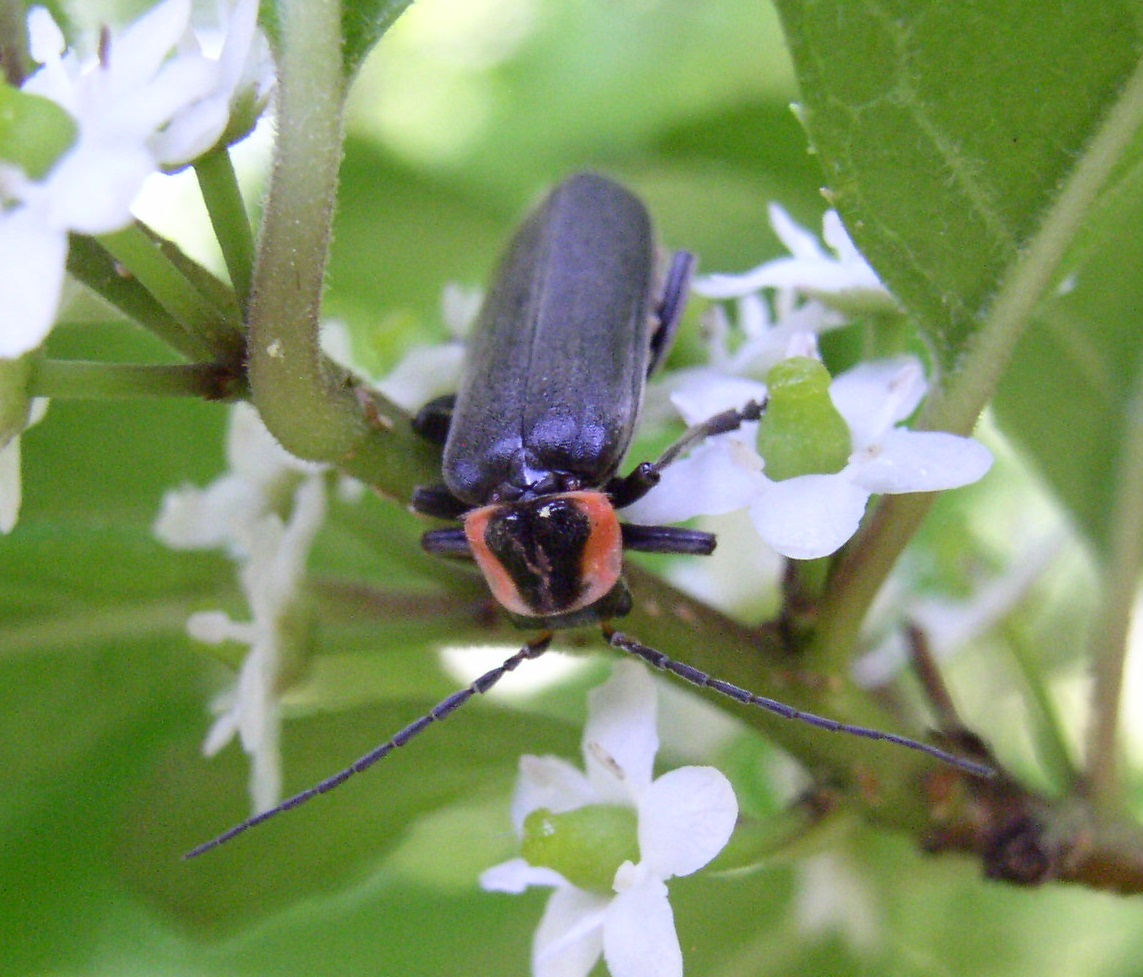

Scientific classification
- Domain: Eukaryota
- Kingdom: Animalia
- Phylum: Arthropoda
- Class: Insecta
- Order: Coleoptera
- Suborder: Polyphaga
- Infraorder: Elateriformia
- Family: Cantharidae
- Genus: Rhaxonycha
- Species: R. carolina

Binomial name
- Rhaxonycha carolina (Fabricius, 1801)

= Rhaxonycha carolina =

Species of beetle

Rhaxonycha carolina, the Carolina cantharid, is a species of soldier beetle in the family Cantharidae. It is found in North America.
