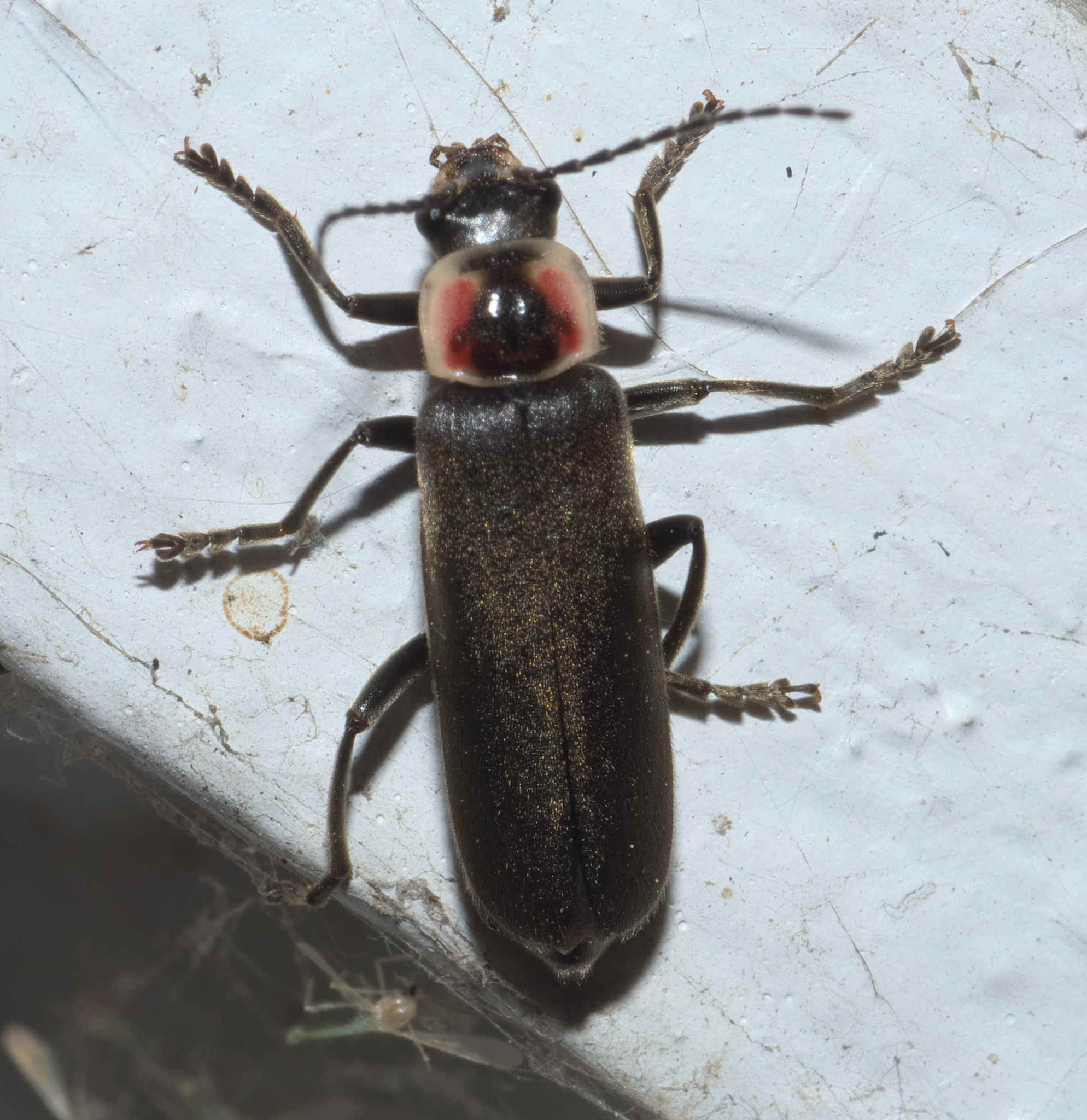
- Rhaxonycha bilobata, Oklahoma

Scientific classification
- Kingdom: Animalia
- Phylum: Arthropoda
- Class: Insecta
- Order: Coleoptera
- Suborder: Polyphaga
- Infraorder: Elateriformia
- Family: Cantharidae
- Genus: Rhaxonycha
- Species: R. bilobata

Binomial name
- Rhaxonycha bilobata McKey-Fender, 1941

= Rhaxonycha bilobata =

Species of beetle

Rhaxonycha bilobata is a species of soldier beetle in the family Cantharidae. It is found in North America.
