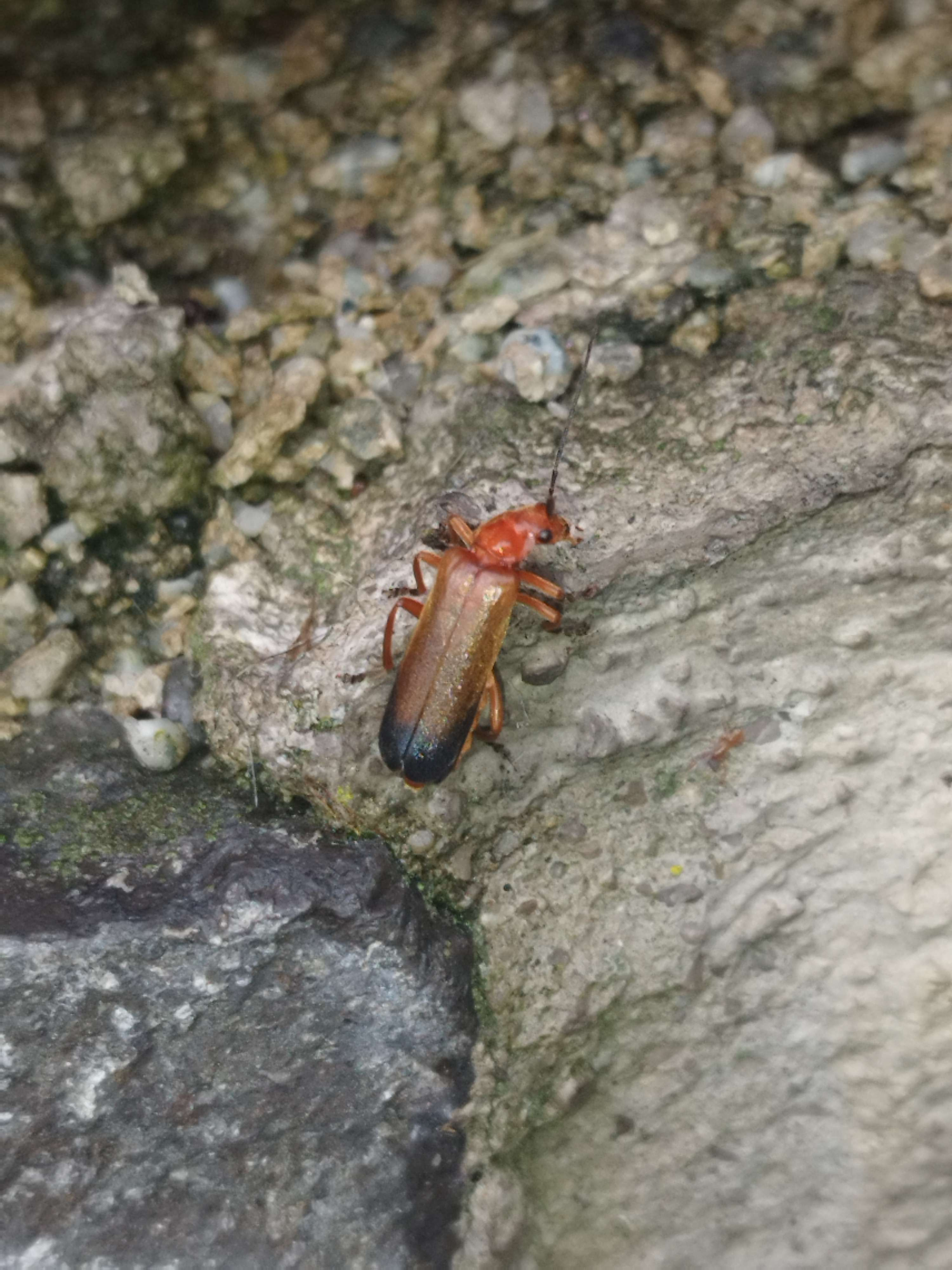

Scientific classification
- Kingdom: Animalia
- Phylum: Arthropoda
- Class: Insecta
- Order: Coleoptera
- Suborder: Polyphaga
- Infraorder: Elateriformia
- Family: Cantharidae
- Genus: Ancistronycha
- Species: A. erichsonii

Binomial name
- Ancistronycha erichsonii (Bach, 1852)

= Ancistronycha erichsonii =

Species of a soldier beetle

Ancistronycha erichsonii, commonly called the black-tailed soldier beetle, is a species of soldier beetle, in the family Cantharidae, that occurs predominantly in Europe and partially in Asia.

== Description ==
The head of the beetle is of reddish-orange colour and it is almost as wide as its pronotum. The pronotum is of the same colour. Elytra are of yellow-ochre to yellow-brown colour with black spots on their tips (sometimes called the apical spots). Hind feet are relatively massive and broad. The body length of this species ranges from 11 to 14 mm (0.43 to 0.55 in).

== Distribution ==
This species occurs in France, Belgium, Italy, Switzerland, Austria, Germany, Czechia, Slovakia, Poland, Hungary, Romania, Serbia, Montenegro, Ukraine, Russia, Georgia and Türkiye.

== Habitat ==
This is a submontane to montane species, it can be found in forest edges, clearings and meadows.

== Life history ==
As all beetles, A. erichsonii is holometabolous. Adults can be found from May to August with their highest activity being in July. The adults feed on pollen and small insects.

== Subspecies ==
Ancistronycha erichsonii haves two subspecies. It is nominotypical subspecies Ancistronycha erichsonii erichsonii and the subspecies Ancistronycha erichsonii kurbatovi. The former occurs in most of this species' range while the latter occurs only in Russia and Georgia.
