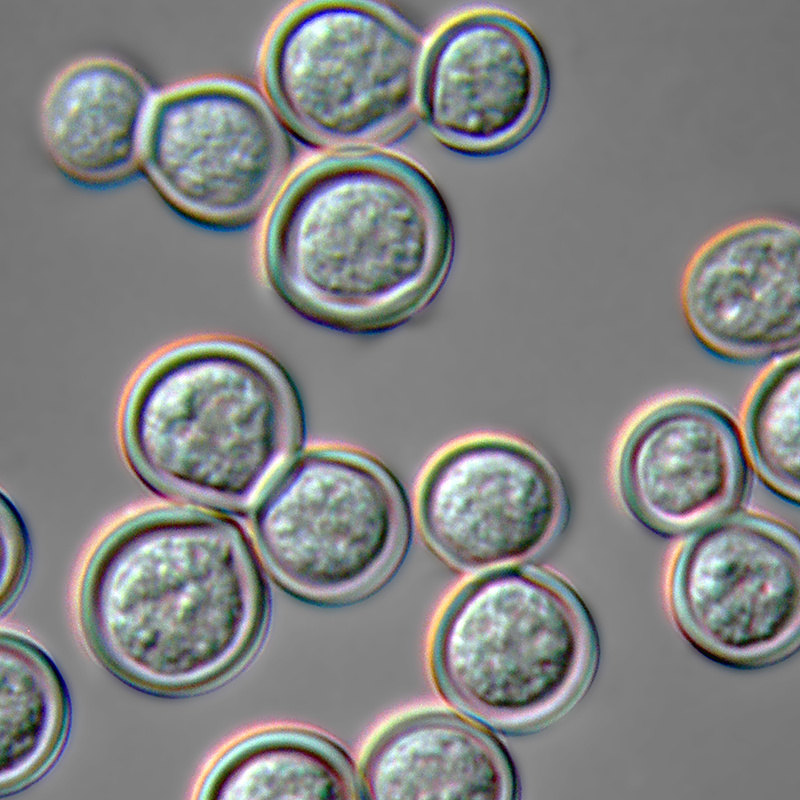
- Blastomyces dermatitidis, yeast form

Scientific classification
- Kingdom: Fungi
- Division: Ascomycota
- Class: Eurotiomycetes
- Order: Onygenales
- Family: Ajellomycetaceae
- Genus: Blastomyces
- Species: B. dermatitidis

Binomial name
- Blastomyces dermatitidis Gilchrist & W.R.Stokes (1898)

= Blastomyces dermatitidis =

Species of fungus

Blastomyces dermatitidis is a dimorphic fungus that causes blastomycosis, an invasive and often serious fungal infection found occasionally in humans and other animals. It lives in soil and wet, decaying wood, often in an area close to a waterway such as a lake, river or stream. Indoor growth may also occur, for example, in accumulated debris in damp sheds or shacks. The fungus is endemic to parts of eastern North America, particularly boreal northern Ontario, southeastern Manitoba, Quebec south of the St. Lawrence River, parts of the U.S. Appalachian mountains and interconnected eastern mountain chains, the west bank of Lake Michigan, the state of Wisconsin, and the entire Mississippi Valley including the valleys of some major tributaries such as the Ohio River. In addition, it occurs rarely in Africa both north and south of the Sahara Desert, as well as in the Arabian Peninsula and the Indian subcontinent. Though it has never been directly observed growing in nature, it is thought to grow there as a cottony white mold, similar to the growth seen in artificial culture at 25 °C (77 °F). In an infected human or animal, however, it converts in growth form and becomes a large-celled budding yeast. Blastomycosis is generally readily treatable with systemic antifungal drugs once it is correctly diagnosed; however, delayed diagnosis is very common except in highly endemic areas.

== Morphology and phylogeny ==
Blastomyces dermatitidis is the causal agent of blastomycosis, a potentially very serious disease that typically begins with a characteristically subtle pneumonia-like infection that may progress, after 1–6 months, to a disseminated phase that causes lesions to form in capillary beds throughout the body, most notably the skin, internal organs, central nervous system and bone marrow. The sexual form of this fungus was formerly known as Ajellomyces dermatitidis.

In 2013, a second species was described in the genus Blastomyces, B. gilchristii, which subsumes certain strains previously assigned to B. dermatitidis. Three more species have been described: Blastomyces emzantsi, Blastomyces parvus and Blastomyces percursus.

Along with two other important human-pathogenic fungi, Histoplasma capsulatum andParacoccidioides brasiliensis, species of Blastomyces belong to the family Ajellomycetaceae. The three principal pathogens in this family are all grouped physiologically as "dimorphic fungi": fungi that switch from a mold-like (filamentous) growth form in the natural habitat to a yeast-like growth form in the warm-blooded animal host. Blastomyces dermatitidis itself is a sexual organism, occurring in nature as both a + mating type and a − mating type. This is epidemiologically important for two reasons: firstly, it implies that the organism will be genetically variable, potentially leading to variations in disease severity, treatment response and habitat preference; secondly, it implies that a suitable, stable habitat must exist for the complex process of sexual reproduction to take place. This habitat is as yet unknown. In its asexual form, the fungus grows as a typical colonial microfungus, comparable to Penicillium or Rhizopus mold forms commonly seen on mouldy bread.

In nature, the fungus forms a network of thread-like mycelium that penetrates the substratum on which it grows, and then after 3–5 days of growth begins to reproduce asexually with small (2–10 μm) conidia (asexual spores). These conidia are probably the main infectious particles produced by the fungus. They form on individual short stalks and readily become airborne when the colony is disturbed; their size places them well within the respirable size range for particles, meaning that they can deposit deeply in the lungs when inhaled. Sexual reproduction by the fungus requires the meeting of colonies of + and – mating type, probably a relatively rare event, and results in the production of small ascomata (sexual fruiting bodies) 200–350 μm, looking, to the naked eye, similar to a woollen fuzz ball, and in microscopic view consisting of a layer of spiralling, springy guard hairs surrounding a fertile core in which groups of eight ascospores (sexual spores) are produced in small round reproductive sacs (asci). The ascospores, at 1.5–2.0 μm, are among the smallest reproductive particles produced by fungi, and are within the respirable size range. The budding yeast cells seen in infected tissues and bodily fluids are generally relatively large (c. 8–15 μm) and characteristically bud through a broad base or neck, making them highly recognizable to the pathologist. A small ("nanic") form is rarely seen with cells under 6 μm.

== Geographic distribution and variants ==
One of the unexplained regularities of nature is that there are several fungi of different phylogenetic ancestry that show a similar pattern of existence: dimorphism (conversion from a filamentous form in the environment to a yeast form in warm-blooded host tissues), virulent pathogenesis (ability to cause a significant infection in an animal host that is otherwise in good health), pulmonary infectivity (infection mainly via the lungs) and sharply delimited endemism (occurrence in only a limited geographic range.). Blastomyces dermatitidis is one of these fungi; the others are Histoplasma capsulatum, Paracoccidioides brasiliensis, Coccidioides immitis, C. posadasii and Talaromyces marneffei.

The geographic range of B. dermatitidis is largely focused around the waterways of the St. Lawrence and Mississippi River systems of North America. There is a widely distributed and much republished, partially erroneous map that shows the U.S. portion of this range accurately, inclusive of occurrence in Minnesota, Wisconsin, Ohio, Kentucky, Arkansas, Tennessee, North and South Carolina, the Virginias, Mississippi, Louisiana, and a few regions of states adjacent to those named. The Canadian range of B. dermatitidis shows an abundance of blastomycosis in broad areas north and south of the St. Lawrence River in Quebec, as well as high endemicity along the north shore of Lake Erie and the low endemicity in southeastern corner of Manitoba. Though the Quebec distribution is reasonably accurate, the rest of Canada is strongly misrepresented. Blastomyces dermatitidis is absent or nearly so from the Lake Erie area, but occurs sporadically on the north shore of Lake Ontario, including metropolitan Toronto, and, most notably, has areas of high endemicity throughout northern Ontario. Remarkably high incidence is noted for some parts of the Kenora area and climatologically similar areas of northwestern Ontario. To the west, the range of endemic blastomycosis extends across southern Manitoba and into adjacent Saskatchewan. A few cases have been reported from north central Alberta, e.g., the Edmonton area, though in these cases an atypical genetic group of the fungus may be involved.

In the rest of the world, B. dermatitidis occurs at low levels in various parts of Africa, from Algeria to South Africa, as well as in and near the Arabian Peninsula. The African isolates are divided into two biologically different antigen groups: isolates from north of the Sahara are similar to North American isolates in having A and K antigens, while southern African isolates lack the A antigen. Isolates from the middle east possess both antigens. The sub-Saharan African isolates differ in the laboratory from other isolates by being exceedingly difficult to convert to the yeast phase, and they also show some enzymatic distinctions.

== Ecology ==
Blastomyces dermatitidis is one of the most ecologically mysterious organisms causing human and animal disease. Prediction of disease risk and prevention of disease are both made extraordinarily difficult by our very poor understanding of where and how this organism normally grows in nature. Despite decades of attempts at isolating organisms from epidemiological foci, B. dermatitidis has only been isolated from the environment 21 times. Most of these isolations have been based on the arduous isolation techniques involving the suspension of soil or other environmental materials in aqueous medium with antibacterial antibiotics, and injection of mice with these materials, followed by sacrifice of the animals when they appear ill or at the end of six weeks. The internal organs of the mice are then checked microscopically for evidence of blastomycosis. Needless to say, the cost and complexity of performing such studies is imposing, especially as the ethical clearance procedures for work involving animals become ever more involved. More direct and economical mycological techniques for environmental isolation, such as dilution plating, have never yielded positive results for Blastomyces growth. Since B. dermatitidis will grow readily from clinical samples on common laboratory media, the lack of success in isolating it from environmental materials is generally ascribed to the inhibitory effects of co-occurring common molds and antibiotic-resistant bacteria.

In just one experiment, a single positive B. dermatitidis culture was gained via use of a novel enrichment broth technique. Recently, in an important breakthrough, a specific PCR technique was developed that was able to detect B. dermatitidis in three environmental samples from a dog kennel that had been experiencing problems with blastomycosis.

What has been learned from direct isolation and recent PCR studies is that B. dermatitidis tends to be associated with soils and wood debris in areas "characterized by an acidic pH, high organic content (due to rotting or decayed wood or vegetation and animal or bird droppings), abundant moisture, and proximity to waterways". Recent PCR detections, for example, concerned a Kentucky dog kennel where 35 of 100 dogs had contracted blastomycosis. Previous isolations have been from comparable sites such as soil and wood debris from an abandoned Wisconsin beaver dam, and woody materials from a Wisconsin woodpile. Isolation of B. dermatitidis was also accomplished from an earthen floor indoors on one occasion.

There has been a long history of justifiable speculation that B. dermatitidis may associate in nature with one or more indigenous North American mammalian host species. To date, however, all the animal species that have been subjected to focused investigation have been exonerated of this specific connection. Unsubstantiated suspicion has particularly focused on the beaver, but the shrew, the bat and the prairie dog have also been focal points of interest, with no conclusive interspecies association being demonstrated to date. The closely related pathogenic fungus P. brasiliensis in South America has a well substantiated, though not well understood, ecological link with the nine-banded armadillo, Dasypus novemcinctus. This member of the mammalian order Edentata has no close relatives in the geographic range of B. dermatitidis.

== Preventive measures ==
Avoidance of exposure in endemic areas is the principal means of disease prevention. Because the agent is known to distribute in dusts, the minimization of dust-generating activities, such as digging, sweeping, etc., is key. Although a method of soil decontamination has been described and demonstrated to be effective, it uses hazardous chemicals and its use is best reserved for situations that cannot be managed otherwise.
