= Chester Wilson Emmons =

American mycologist (1900–1985)

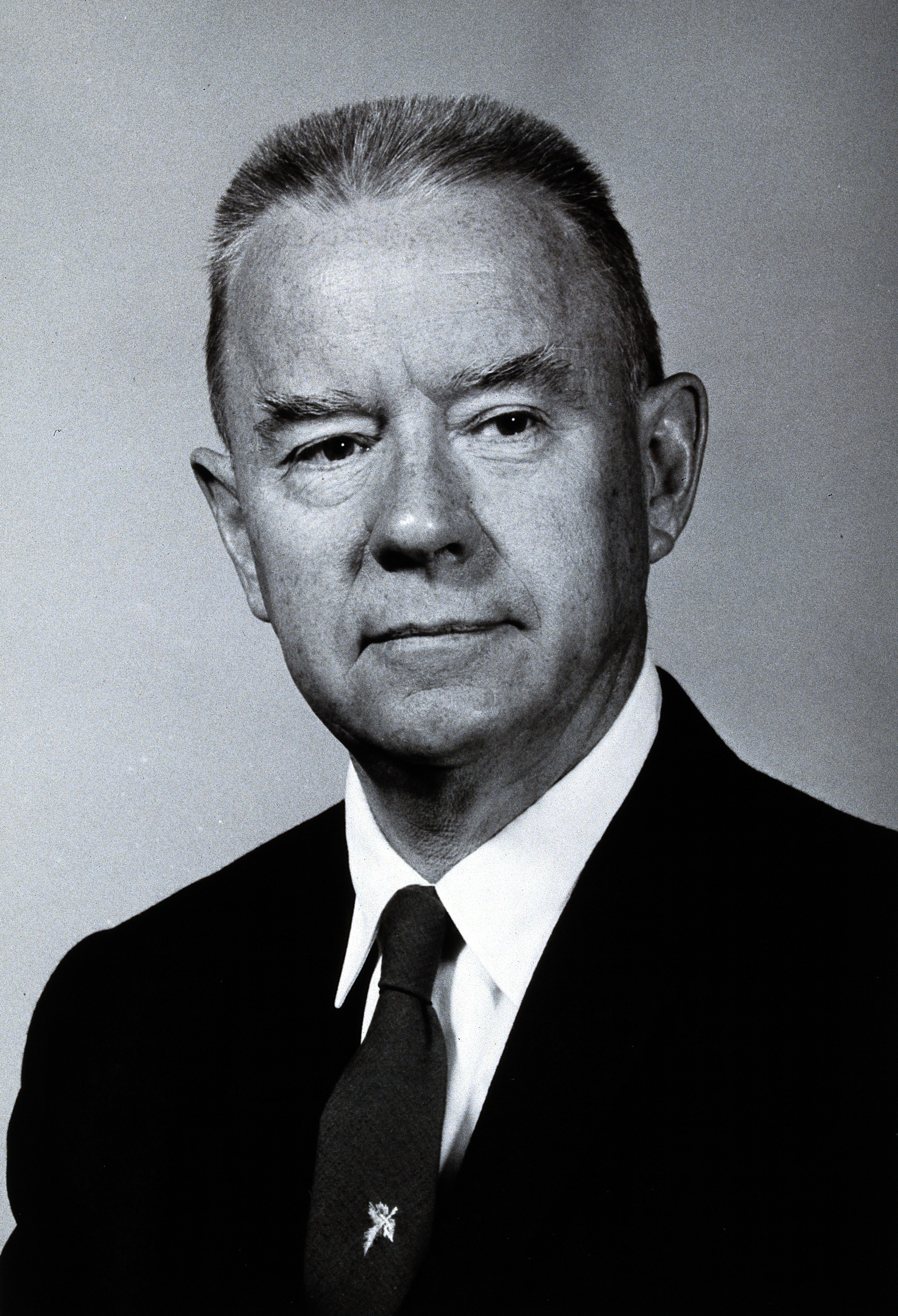
- Emmons, 1960
- Born: August 21, 1900; What Cheer, Iowa, U.S.
- Died: August 5, 1985 (aged 84)
- Education: Penn College, Oskaloosa, Iowa; Columbia University
- Known for: First mycologist at National Institutes of Health; Named for Emmonsia
- Medical career
- Profession: Mycologist
- Field: Infectious diseases
- Institutions: Columbia University; School of Tropical Medicine, Puerto Rico; National Institutes of Health
- Sub-specialties: Study of fungi
- Research: Pathogenic fungi, fungal disease

Chester Wilson Emmons (August 21, 1900 – August 5, 1985) was an American scientist, who researched fungi that cause diseases. He was the first mycologist at the National Institutes of Health (NIH), where for 31 years he served as head of its Medical Mycology Section.

After studying botany at Penn College and the host-parasite relationship of Ampelomyces quisqualis at Columbia University, he transferred to the School of Tropical Medicine in Puerto Rico, where he confirmed that Actinomyces bovis is present in the mouths of healthy people. In 1934, back at Columbia, he proposed that some fungi should be defined according to their structure, not the effects of the resulting fungal infection. He was the first to recognise coccidioidomycosis in desert rodents, and he established that soil is a natural reservoir for Histoplasma capsulatum, which flourishes when the soil is supplemented by bird, chicken and bat droppings. He proved an association between Cryptococcus neoformans and pigeon nesting sites, after being the first to isolate the fungus from its natural habitat. Emmons provided early evidence for the effectiveness of amphotericin B in treating of systemic fungal infections. His modified agar medium for fungal culture is sometimes referred to as Sabouraud agar, Emmons. In 1942, Emmons defined a new species Haplosporangium parvum, later reclassified into a separate genus and renamed Emmonsia.

In 1960, as president of the Mycological Society of America (MSA), he made the study of fungi the focus of his presidential address, in an effort to raise the profile of medical mycology. Emmons also taught medical students at George Washington University, and later taught medical mycology to physicians at the NIH's clinical centre. He contributed as an editor to several journals including the American Journal of Epidemiology, Antibiotics and Chemotherapy, Mycopathologia and Mycologia Applicata, Journal of Bacteriology, Mycologia, and Clinical Medicine. Shortly before his death, he had disclosed that he felt his biggest contribution was demonstrating that fungal infections were common and widespread, and that their causal organisms were everywhere.

== Early life and education ==
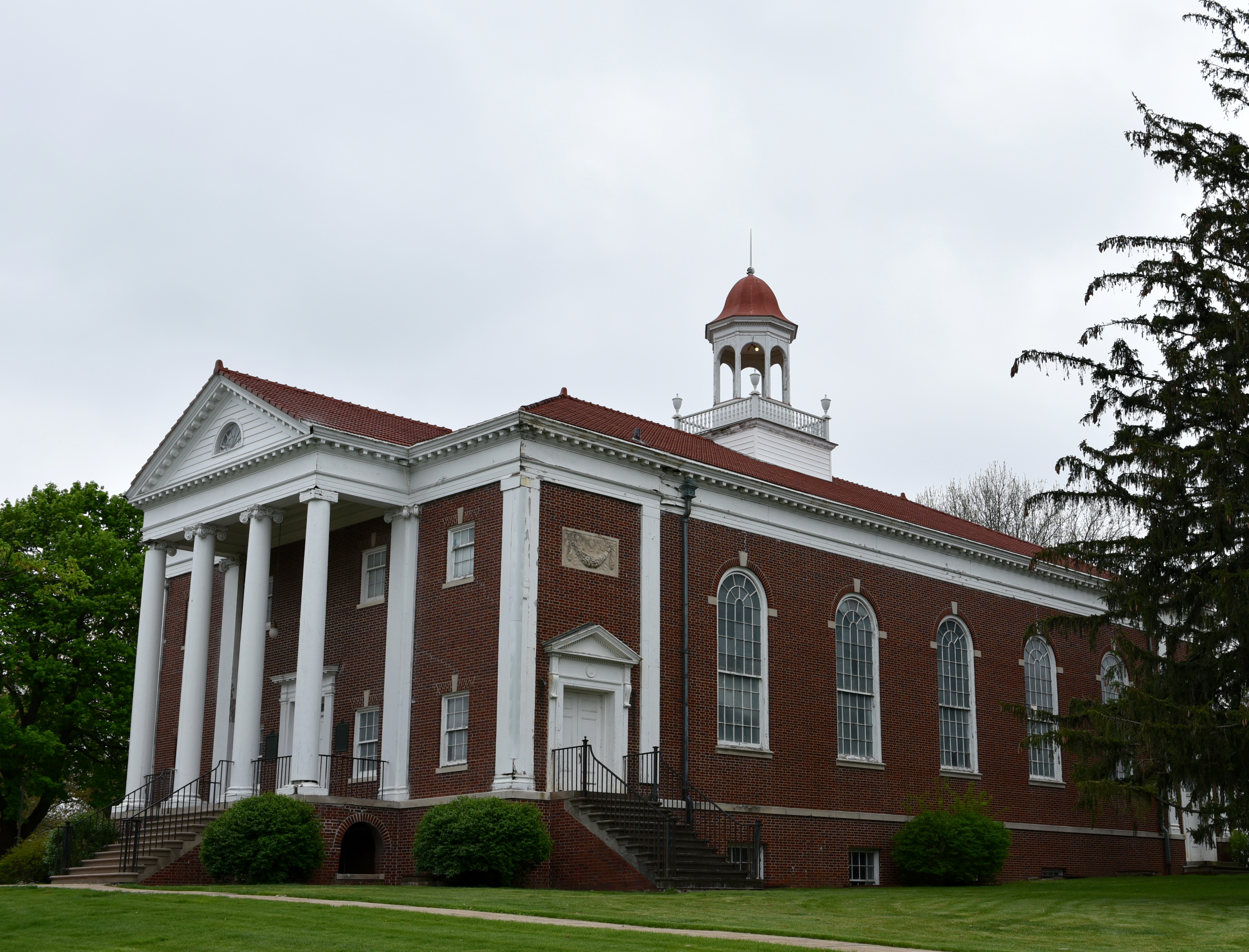
The Spencer Chapel at Penn College

Chester Wilson Emmons was born on August 21, 1900, in What Cheer, Iowa, to Wilson Thomas and Amy Penrose Emmons, was the eldest of their five children, and belonged to the Religious Society of Friends. He attended the Friends schools in Iowa and Ohio, where he also taught for some time. When at home, he assisted at the family farm.

He graduated from Penn College in Oskaloosa, Iowa, in 1926. The following June, under George Willard Martin, he completed his master's degree in botany, titled "Thelephoraceae of Iowa".

== Training ==
Emmons left Iowa and moved to New York where he earned a Roberts fellowship at Columbia University under the supervision of professor Robert A. Harper, and studied the host-parasite relationship of Ampelomyces quisqualis, then known as Cicinnobolus desai. At Columbia, he trained with Rhoda W. Benham and in 1929 was appointed her assistant in mycology.

== Career ==
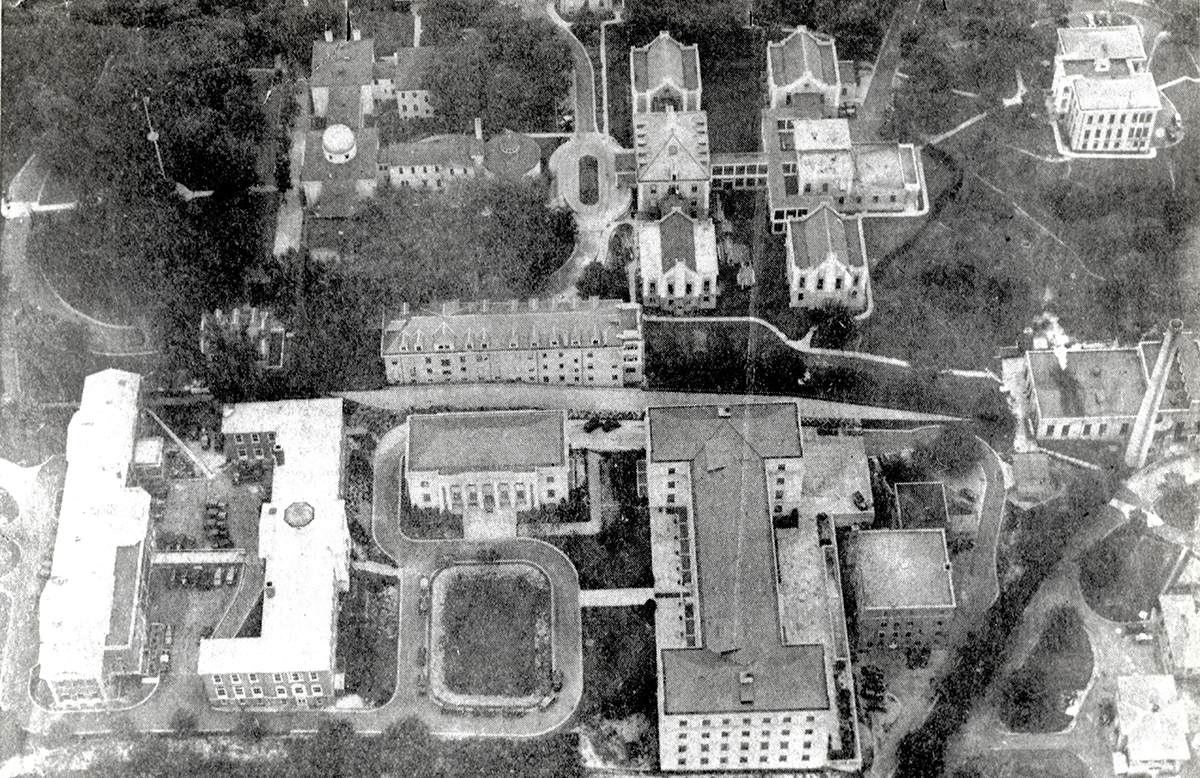
National Institutes of Health 1936

After completing his Ph.D. he took up a post at the School of Tropical Medicine in Puerto Rico, where he would continue research on fungi that cause disease in humans. In Puerto Rico, he confirmed Frederick T. Lord's conclusions of 1910, that Actinomyces bovis is present in the mouths of healthy people.

In 1934, back at Columbia, he published his first medical papers in which he proposed that the genera of common fungal causes of infections of the skin; Microsporum, Trichophyton and Epidermophyton should be redefined according to the structure of the fungi, not the varying clinical features of the disease. In 1936, Emmons became the first medical mycologist appointed by the US government, after the National Institutes of Health (NIH), then in Washington DC, was given permission to finance the post. Here he set out to look for the natural reservoirs of disease causing fungi. For 31 years he served as head of the NIH's Medical Mycology Section.

In 1942, Emmons and Ashburn discovered unusually large particles in the lungs of mice and ground squirrels in Arizona. They initially felt them to belong to the genera Coccidioides, but following culture they defined it as a new species Haplosporangium parvum, a fungus that caused adiaspiromycosis, a lung disease in wild animals, but rare in people. When its spores were inhaled, they increased in size from 2–4 μm to 40–500 μm in diameter. It was reclassified into a separate genus in 1958 and renamed Emmonsia for Emmons. He was the first to recognise coccidioidomycosis in desert rodents, and establishing that soil is a natural reservoir for Histoplasma capsulatum, which flourishes when the soil is supplemented by bird, chicken and bat droppings. He also proved an association between Cryptococcus neoformans and pigeon nesting sites, after being the first to isolate the fungus from its natural habitat. He provided early evidence for the effectiveness of amphotericin B in treating of systemic fungal infections. In 1977, he modified Raymond Sabouraud’s agar to produce a more pH neutral substance with a lower glucose concentration, to allow a better culture medium for fungi that cause disease in humans.

For 20 years from 1942, he taught medical students at George Washington University. From 1953, he taught medical mycology to physicians at the NIH's new clinical centre. He authored over 150 research papers, and co-authored a book on medical mycology, which went to at least three editions.

== Awards and honours ==
Between 1954 and 1960 he was vice president of the International Society for Human and Animal Mycology, and was a recipient of its Lucille K. George Medal. In 1960, he was president of the Mycological Society of America (MSA). In an effort to raise the profile of medical mycology, he presented a paper titled "The Jekyll-Hydes of mycology", making medical mycology the focus of his presidential address to the MSA at Stillwater, Oklahoma. In 1982, he received the MSA's distinguished mycologist award.

The American Academy of Microbiology, American Association for the Advancement of Science, and the New York Academy of Sciences all elected him a fellow. The Association Mexicana Microbiologia made him an honorary member and the World Health Organization Expert Advisory Panel on Parasitic Diseases enrolled his expertise from 1960 to 1975.

== Other roles ==
He also held posts at the College of Physicians and Surgeons, the Vanderbilt Clinic in New York, and the Georgetown University School of Medicine. He contributed as an editor to several journals including the Abstracts of Mycology, American Journal of Epidemiology, Antibiotics and Chemotherapy, Mycopathologia and Mycologia Applicata, Journal of Bacteriology, Mycologia, and Clinical Medicine.

== Personal and family ==
In 1929, while working on his Ph.D., he met and married Florence Hall. They had five children: Helen, Richard, Donald, Elizabeth and Nancy.

== Later life ==
After retiring in 1966, Emmons and his wife first made a three-month stay in Peru, where they volunteered at a jungle hospital. They then returned to Arizona, where he took up the appointment of visiting professor at Arizona State University. In Arizona, he joined a rock club, where he learnt to cut and polish stones. In 1978 due deteriorating health, the couple moved to North Carolina.

== Death and legacy ==
Emmons died on August 5, 1985. Two years earlier he had disclosed to mycologist Michael W. McGinnis, that he felt his biggest contribution was demonstrating that fungal infections were common and widespread, and that their causal organisms were everywhere.

His modified agar medium for fungal culture is sometimes referred to as Sabouraud agar, Emmons. The fungal genus Emmonsia is named for him.

== Selected publications ==
=== Articles ===
- Emmons, C. W.; Ashburn, L. L. (1942). "The Isolation of Haplosporangium parvum n. sp. and Coccidioides immitis from Wild Rodents. Their Relationship to Coccidioidomycosis". Public Health Reports. 57 (46): 1715–1727. doi:10.2307/4584276. ISSN 0094-6214. JSTOR 4584276. S2CID 76492435. (Co-authored with L. L. Ashburn)
- Emmons, C. W. (June 1949). "Diagnostic problems in medical mycology". American Journal of Public Health and the Nation's Health. 39 (6): 713–718. doi:10.2105/ajph.39.6.713. ISSN 0002-9572. PMC 1528118. PMID 18150787.
- Emmons, C. W. (April 1950). "Histoplasmosis: Animal Reservoirs and Other Sources in Nature of Pathogenic Fungus, Histoplasma". American Journal of Public Health and the Nation's Health. 40 (4): 436–440. doi:10.2105/ajph.40.4.436. ISSN 0002-9572. PMC 1528481. PMID 18017195.
- EMMONS CW (November 1951). "The isolation from soil of fungi which cause disease in man". Transactions of the New York Academy of Sciences. 14 (1): 51–54. doi:10.1111/j.2164-0947.1951.tb01055.x. ISSN 0028-7113. PMID 14901429.
- EMMONS CW (September 1960). "The Jekyll-Hydes of mycology". Mycologia. 52 (5): 669–680. doi:10.1080/00275514.1960.12024941. ISSN 0027-5514. PMID 13890143.

=== Books ===
- Medical Mycology. London; printed in U.S.A. 1963. OCLC 560299260. (Co-authored with Chapman H. Binford and John P. Utz)
