= Emergomycosis =

Dimorphic fungal infection

- Other names: Emmonsiosis
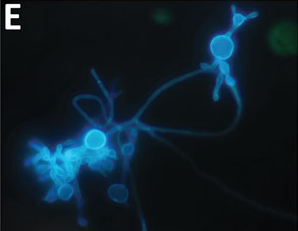
- A conidiospore of Emergomyces orientalis, from a Tibetan man with emergomycosis
- Specialty: Infectious diseases
- Symptoms: Skin rash
- Causes: Emergomyces, previously classified under genus Emmonsia
- Risk factors: HIV, organ transplant, steroid use.
- Diagnostic method: skin biopsy, histopathology
- Differential diagnosis: Histoplasmosis
- Treatment: Antifungals
- Medication: Amphotericin B
- Frequency: Rare

Emergomycosis, previously known as emmonsiosis, is a systemic dimorphic fungal infection that can affect multiple organs, generally always affects the skin, and can become widespread. It is endemic to South Africa and primarily affects individuals with HIV/AIDS and other immunocompromised people, although it can also infect people with healthy immune systems. The lesions in the skin look like small red bumps and patches with a dip, ulcer and dead tissue in the centre.

It is caused by the Emergomyces species, a novel dimorphic fungus, previously classified under the genus Emmonsia. These fungi are found in soil and transmitted by breathing in its spores from the air. Inside the body it converts to yeast-like cells which then cause disease and invade beyond the lungs. Diagnosis is by skin biopsy and its appearance under the microscope. It is difficult to distinguish from histoplasmosis.

Treatment is usually with amphotericin B. Emergomycosis can be fatal.

Emergomycosis is rare. The disseminated type is more prevalent in South Africa, particularly in people with HIV. The disease is named for Chester Wilson Emmons who first described Emmonsia.

== Signs and symptoms ==
The most common clinical manifestations of emergomycosis are:

- Skin lesions
- Splenomegaly
- Lymphadenopathy
- Acute endocarditis and/or pericarditis
- Osteomyelitis

Generally, all cases have involvement of the skin. The lesions look like small red bumps and patches with a dip, ulcer and dead tissue in the centre. There may be several lesions and their distribution can be widespread. The lungs may be affected.

== Cause ==
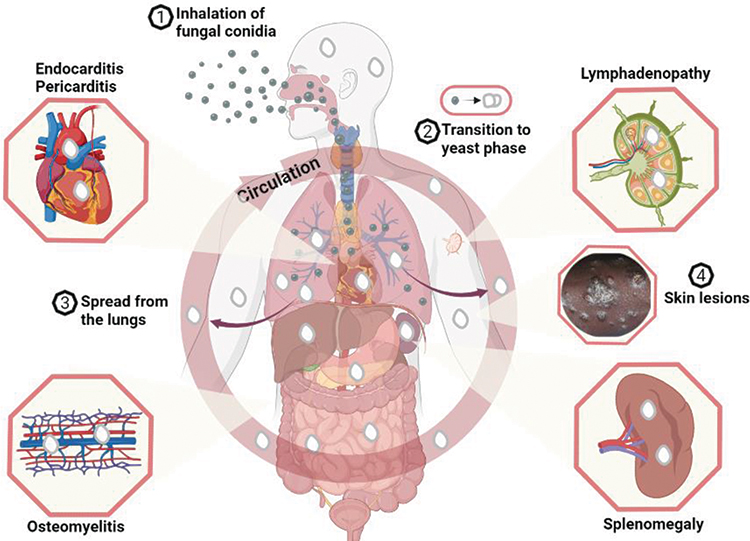
A diagram showing the pathogenesis of infection with the dimorphic fungus emergomyces

Emergomycosis is caused by the Emergomyces species, a dimorphic fungus, previously classified under the genus Emmonsia. Following a revised taxonomy in 2017 based on DNA sequence analyses, five of these Emmonsia-like fungi have been placed under the separate genus Emergomyces. These include Emergomyces pasteurianus, Emergomyces africanus, Emergomyces canadensis, Emergomyces orientalis and Emergomyces europaeus. Emergomyces africanus causes over 2/3 of documented human cases of emergomycosis. Cases in Europe are much rarer, but when they do occur, they are usually due to E. pasteurianus.

The fungus is found in soil, where it normally lives as a mold that does not cause disease. Transmission is by breathing in fungal spores from the air. Inside the body it converts to yeast-like cells which then cause disease and invade beyond the lungs. In people with HIV, Emergomycosis has been associated with Immune reconstitution inflammatory syndrome following initiating antiretroviral treatment.

The fungus only undergoes its transformation into yeast once it reaches the terminal (deep) portions of the lungs. It does not actually cause significant respiratory infection in most cases, but rather tends to spread hematogenously or possibly through lymphatics to other organs, where it can cause life-threatening infections such as endocarditis.

The disease is most commonly observed among people who have a weakened immune system and risk factors include HIV, organ transplant and steroid use. It is especially associated with HIV+ individuals with CD4+ T-cell counts under 100 cells/mm^{3}.

== Diagnosis ==
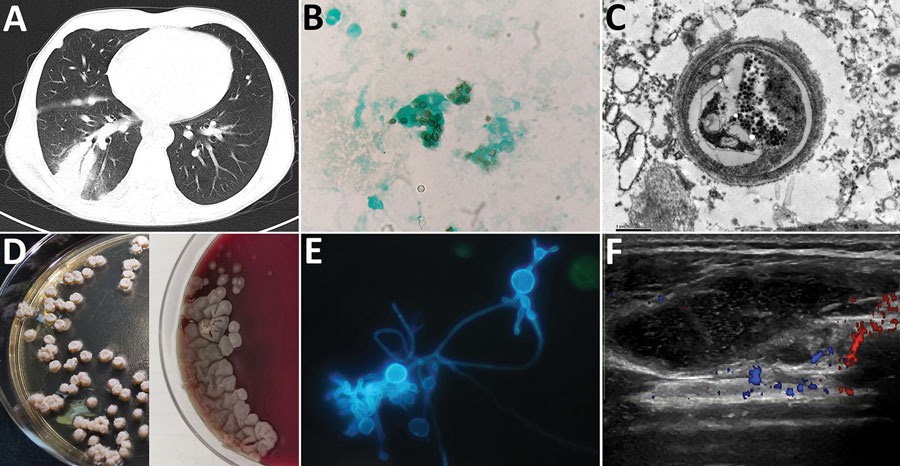
Various pathology images from a case of emergomycosis reported in China

Diagnosis is by skin biopsy and its appearance under the microscope. In its pathogenic form, it is a budding yeast. As of 2023, there is no clinical guideline or well-defined diagnostic pathway for emergomycosis.

=== Differential diagnosis ===
Generally, emergomycosis may be difficult to distinguish from histoplasmosis. Other conditions that appear similar include tuberculosis, blastomycosis, sporotrichosis, chicken pox, Kaposi's sarcoma and drug reactions.

== Treatment ==
Treatment of emergomycosis usually includes amphotericin B as the first-line drug of choice, replaced by azoles after several weeks due to the high toxicity of amphotericin B. There is some very early evidence that triazoles may yield better results when used as the first-line or sole antifungal drug of choice.

== Prognosis ==
Studies have identified fatality rates of 40-50% in cases of emergomycosis. However, a significant portion of non-survivors are individuals diagnosed post-mortem (after death) who did not receive any treatment. The mortality rate is thought to be similar for symptomatic people who are immunocompetent as they are for people with HIV or other causes of immunodeficiency.

== History ==
The disease was originally named for Chester Wilson Emmons who first described Emmonsia. The disease was thought to be a rare condition of the lung. Early cases may have been misdiagnosed as histoplasmosis.

== Other animals ==
The genus Emmonsia can cause adiaspiromycosis, a lung disease in wild animals. Emergomycosis has also been documented in animals in areas where it does not normally infect humans.
