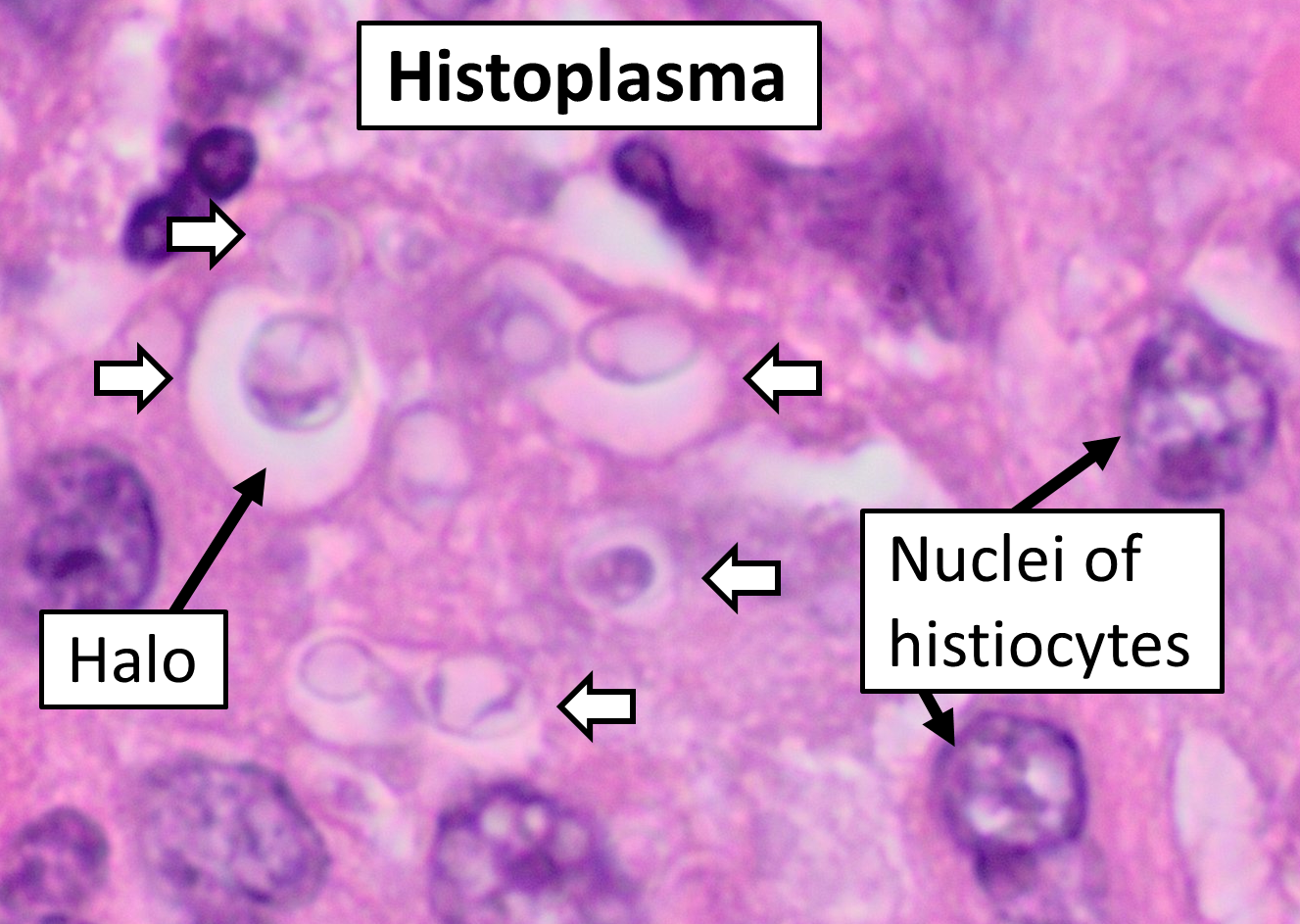
- Histopathology of Histoplasma capsulatum, H&E stain, showing organisms surrounded by halos, in a granuloma of epithelioid histiocytes.

Scientific classification
- Kingdom: Fungi
- Division: Ascomycota
- Class: Eurotiomycetes
- Order: Onygenales
- Family: Ajellomycetaceae
- Genus: Histoplasma
- Species: H. capsulatum

Binomial name
- Histoplasma capsulatum Darling (1906)

= Histoplasma capsulatum =

Species of fungus

Histoplasma capsulatum is a species of dimorphic fungus. Its sexual form is called Ajellomyces capsulatus. It can cause pulmonary and disseminated histoplasmosis.

Histoplasma capsulatum is "distributed worldwide, except in Antarctica, but most often associated with river valleys" and occurs chiefly in the "Central and Eastern United States" followed by "Central and South America, and other areas of the world". It is most prevalent in the Ohio and Mississippi River valleys. It was discovered by Samuel Taylor Darling in 1906.

== Growth and morphology ==
Histoplasma capsulatum is an ascomycetous fungus closely related to Blastomyces dermatitidis. It is potentially sexual, and its sexual state, Ajellomyces capsulatus, can readily be produced in culture, though it has not been directly observed in nature. H. capsulatum groups with B. dermatitidis and the South American pathogen Paracoccidioides brasiliensis in the recently recognized fungal family Ajellomycetaceae. It is dimorphic and switches from a mould-like (filamentous) growth form in the natural habitat to a small, budding yeast form in the warm-blooded animal host.

Like B. dermatitidis, H. capsulatum has two mating types, "+" and "–". The great majority of North American isolates belongs to a single genetic type, but a study of multiple genes suggests a recombining, sexual population. A recent analysis has suggested that the prevalent North American genetic type and a less common type should be considered separate phylogenetic species, distinct from H. capsulatum isolates obtained in Central and South America and other parts of the world. These entities are temporarily designated NAm1 (the rare type, which includes a famous experimental isolate designated "the Downs strain") and NAm2 (the common type). As yet, no well-established clinical or geographic distinction is seen between these two genetic groups.

In its asexual form, the fungus grows as a colonial microfungus strongly similar in macromorphology to B. dermatitidis. A microscopic examination shows a marked distinction: H. capsulatum produces two types of conidia, globose macroconidia, 8–15 μm, with distinctive tuberculate or finger-like cell wall ornamentation, and ovoid microconidia, 2–4 μm, which appear smooth or finely roughened. Whether either of these conidial types is the principal infectious particle is unclear. They form on individual short stalks and readily become airborne when the colony is disturbed. Ascomata of the sexual state are 80–250 μm, and are very similar in appearance and anatomy to those described above for B. dermatitidis. The ascospores are similarly minute, averaging 1.5 μm.

The budding yeast cells formed in infected tissues are small (about 2–4 μm) and are characteristically seen forming in clusters within phagocytic cells, including histiocytes and other macrophages, as well as monocytes. An African phylogenetic species, H. duboisii, often forms larger yeast cells to 15 μm.

== Geographic distribution ==
Histoplasma capsulatum is "distributed worldwide, except in Antarctica, but most often associated with river valleys" and occurs chiefly in the "Central and Eastern United States" followed by "Central and South America, and other areas of the world" It is most prevalent in the Ohio and Mississippi river valleys.

The enzootic and endemic zones of H. capsulatum can be roughly divided into core areas, where the fungus occurs widely in soil or on vegetation contaminated by bird droppings or equivalent organic inputs, and peripheral areas, where the fungus occurs relatively rarely in association with soil, but is still found abundantly in heavy accumulations of bat or bird guano in enclosed spaces such as caves, buildings, and hollow trees. The principal core area for this species includes the valleys of the Mississippi, Ohio, and Potomac Rivers in the USA, as well as a wide span of adjacent areas extending from Kansas, Illinois, Indiana, and Ohio in the north to Mississippi, Louisiana, and Texas in the south. In some areas, such as Kansas City, skin testing with the histoplasmin antigen preparation shows that 80–90% of the resident population have an antibody reaction to H. capsulatum, probably indicating prior subclinical infection. Northern U.S. states such as Minnesota, Michigan, New York and Vermont are peripheral areas for histoplasmosis, but have scattered counties where 5–19% of lifetime residents show exposure to H. capsulatum. One New York county, St. Lawrence county (across the St. Lawrence River from the Cornwall– Preston – Brockville area of Ontario, Canada) shows exposures over 20%.

The distribution of H. capsulatum in Canada is not as well documented as in the US. The St. Lawrence Valley is probably the best known endemic region based both on case reports and on a number of skin test reaction studies that were done between 1945 and 1970. The Montreal area is a particularly well documented endemic focus, not just in the agricultural regions surrounding the city but also within the city itself. The Mount Royal area in central Montreal, especially the north and east sides of Mt. Royal Park, showed exposure rates between 20 and 50% in schoolchildren and locally lifetime-resident university students. A particularly high rate of 79.3% exposure was shown in St. Thomas, Ontario, south of London, Ontario, after 7 local residents had died of histoplasmosis in 1957. Based on numerous small regional studies, histoplasmin skin test reactors form ca. 10–50 % of the population in much of southern Ontario and in Quebec’s St. Lawrence Valley, ca. 5% in southern Manitoba and some northerly parts of Quebec (e.g., Abitibi-Témiscamingue), and ca. 1% in Nova Scotia. Exposure of aboriginal Canadians occurs remarkably far north in Quebec, but has not been reported in similar boreal biogeoclimatic zones in many other parts of Canada. Recently and remarkably, a cluster of four indigenously acquired cases of histoplasmosis was shown to be associated with a golf course in suburban Edmonton, Alberta. Examination suggested that local soil was the source.

== Spectrum of disease ==
Histoplasmosis is usually a subclinical infection that does not come to the attention of the person involved. The organism tends to remain alive in the scattered pulmonary calcifications; therefore, some cases are detected by emergence of serious infection when a patient becomes immunocompromised, perhaps decades later. Frank cases are most often seen as acute pulmonary histoplasmosis, a disease that resembles acute pneumonia but is usually self-limited. It is most often seen in children newly exposed to H. capsulatum or in heavily exposed individuals. Erythematous skin conditions arising from antigen reactions may complicate the disease, as may myalgias, arthralgias, and rarely, arthritic conditions. Emphysema sufferers may contract chronic cavitary pulmonary histoplasmosis as a disease complication; eventually the cavity formed may be occupied by an Aspergillus fungus ball (aspergilloma), potentially leading to massive hemoptysis. Another uncommon form of histoplasmosis is a slowly progressing condition known as granulomatous mediastinitis, in which the lymph nodes in the mediastinal cavity between the lungs become inflamed and ultimately necrotic; the swollen nodes or draining fluid may ultimately affect the bronchi, the superior vena cava, the esophagus or the pericardium. A particularly dangerous condition is mediastinal fibrosis, in which a subset of individuals with granulomatous mediastinitis develop an uncontrolled fibrotic reaction that may press on the lungs or the bronchi, or may cause right heart failure. There are a number of other rare pulmonary manifestations of histoplasmosis.

Histoplasmosis, like blastomycosis, may disseminate haematogenously to infect internal organs and tissues, but it does so in a very low proportion of cases, and half or more of these dissemination cases involve immunocompromisation. Unlike blastomycosis, histoplasmosis is a recognized AIDS-defining illness in people with HIV infection; disseminated histoplasmosis affects approximately 5% of AIDS patients with CD4+ cell counts <150 cells/μL in highly endemic areas. The incidence of this condition dropped significantly after introduction of current anti-HIV therapies. Other conditions very uncommonly associated with H. capsulatum include endocarditis and peritonitis.

== Ecology and epidemiology ==
Histoplasma capsulatum appears to be strongly associated with the droppings of certain bird species as well as bats. A mixture of these droppings and certain soil types is particularly conducive to proliferation. In highly endemic areas there is a strong association with soil under and around chicken houses, and with areas where soil or vegetation has become heavily contaminated with faecal material deposited by flocking birds such as starlings and blackbirds. Bird roosting areas that are Histoplasma-free appear to be lower in nitrogen, phosphorus, organic matter and moisture than contaminated roosting areas. The guano of gulls and other colonially nesting water-associated birds is rarely connected to histoplasmosis. Bat dwellings, including caves, attics and hollow trees, are classic H. capsulatum habitats.

Histoplasmosis outbreaks are typically associated with cleaning guano accumulations or clearing guano-covered vegetation, or with exploration of bat caves. In addition, however, outbreaks may be associated with wind-blown dust liberated by construction projects in endemic areas: a classic outbreak is one associated with intense construction activity, including subway construction, in Montreal in 1963.

As with blastomycosis, a good understanding of the precise ecological affinities of H. capsulatum is greatly complicated by the difficulty of isolating the fungus directly from nature. Again, the mouse passage procedure originally devised by Emmons must be used. A direct PCR technique for detection of H. capsulatum in soil has been published. H. capsulatum appears particularly likely to cause clinical disease in young children, persons working in sites contaminated by conducive bird or bat droppings, persons exposed to construction dust raised from contaminated sites, immunocompromised patients, and emphysema sufferers. Elimination of the agent from contaminated soils typically involves the use of toxic fumigants with limited success.

== Etymology ==
In 1905, Samuel Taylor Darling serendipitously identified a protozoan-like microorganism in an autopsy specimen while trying to understand malaria, which was prevalent during the construction of the Panama Canal. He named this microorganism Histoplasma capsulatum because it invaded the cytoplasm (plasma) of histiocyte-like cells (Histo) and had a refractive halo mimicking a capsule (capsulatum), a misnomer.

== Additional images ==
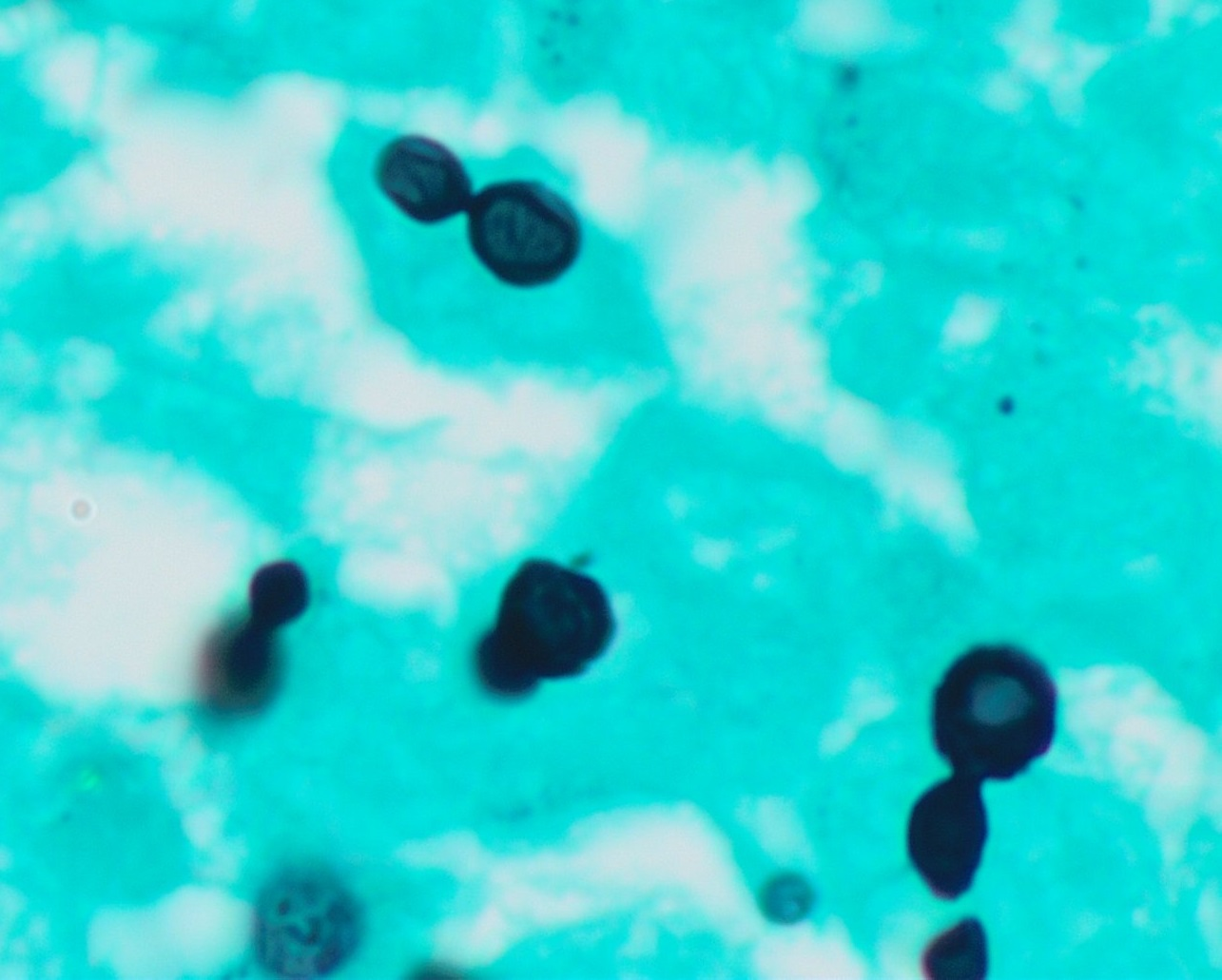
Histopathology of Histoplasma capsulatum, GMS stain, showing narrow budding yeast

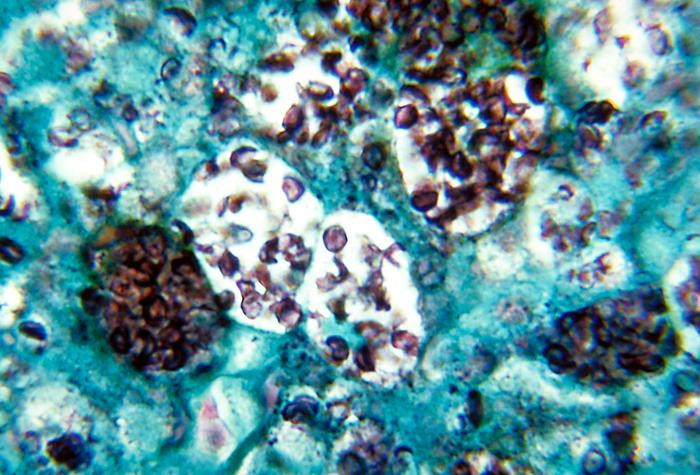
H. capsulatum. Methenamine silver stain.

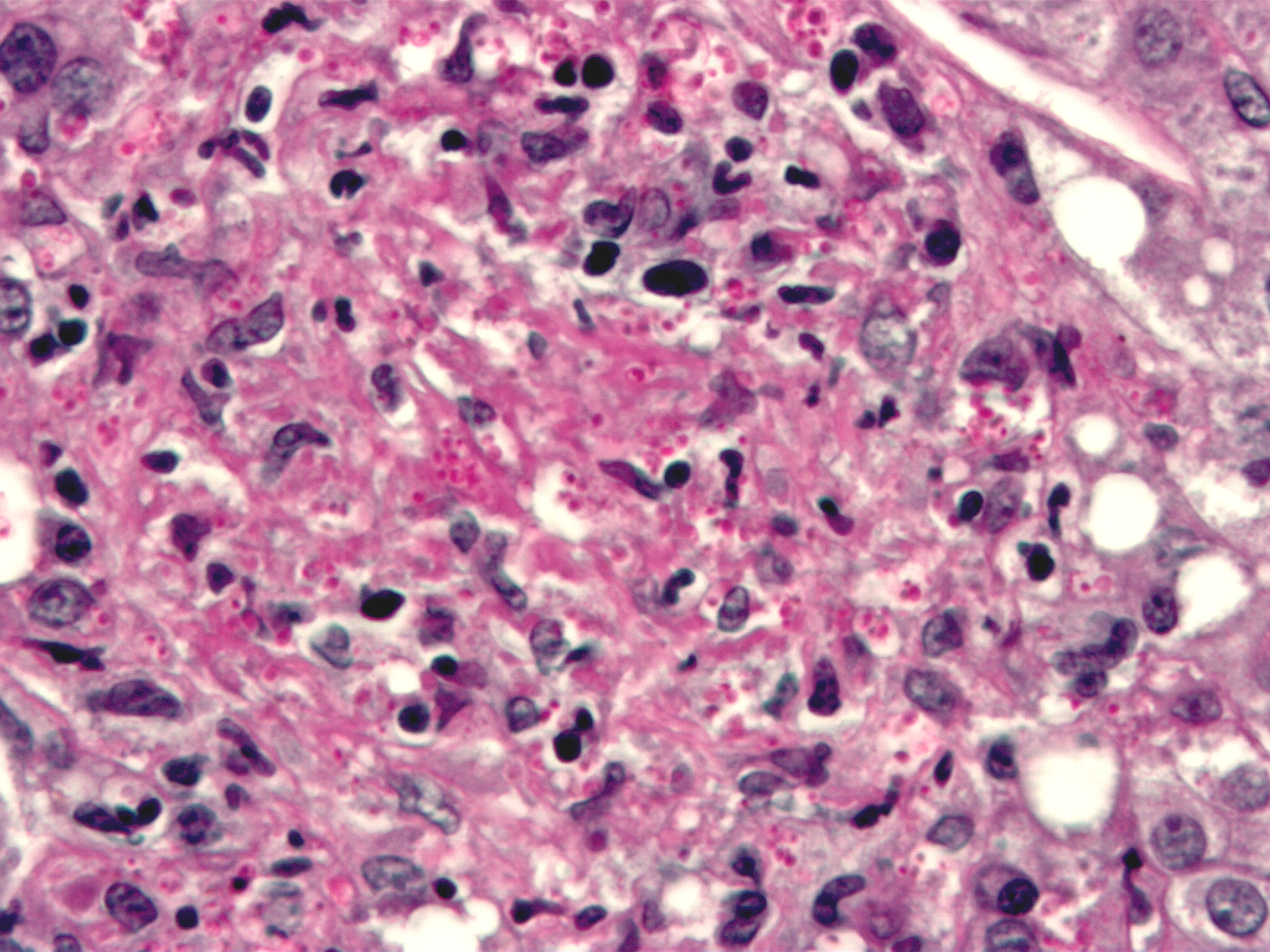
Histoplasma (bright red, small, circular). PAS diastase stain

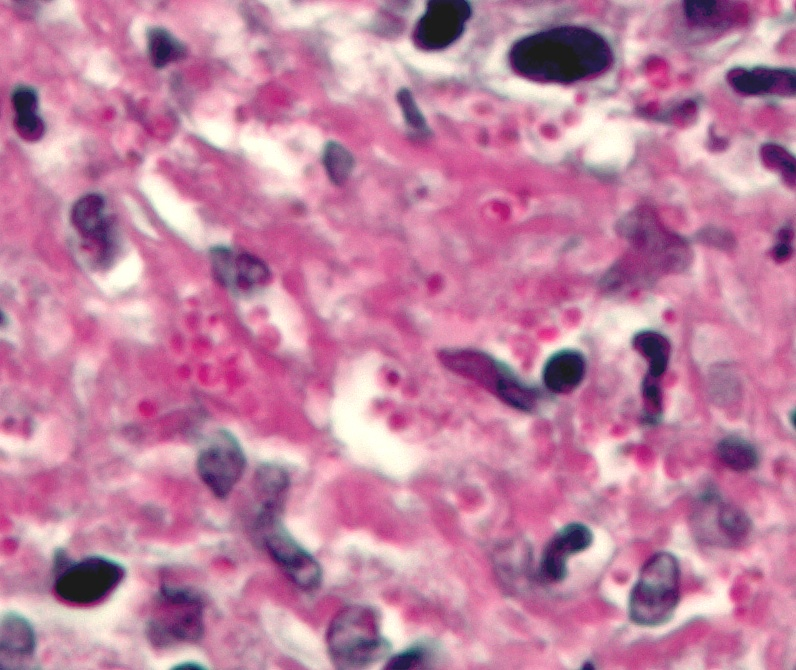
Histoplasma. PAS diastase stain.

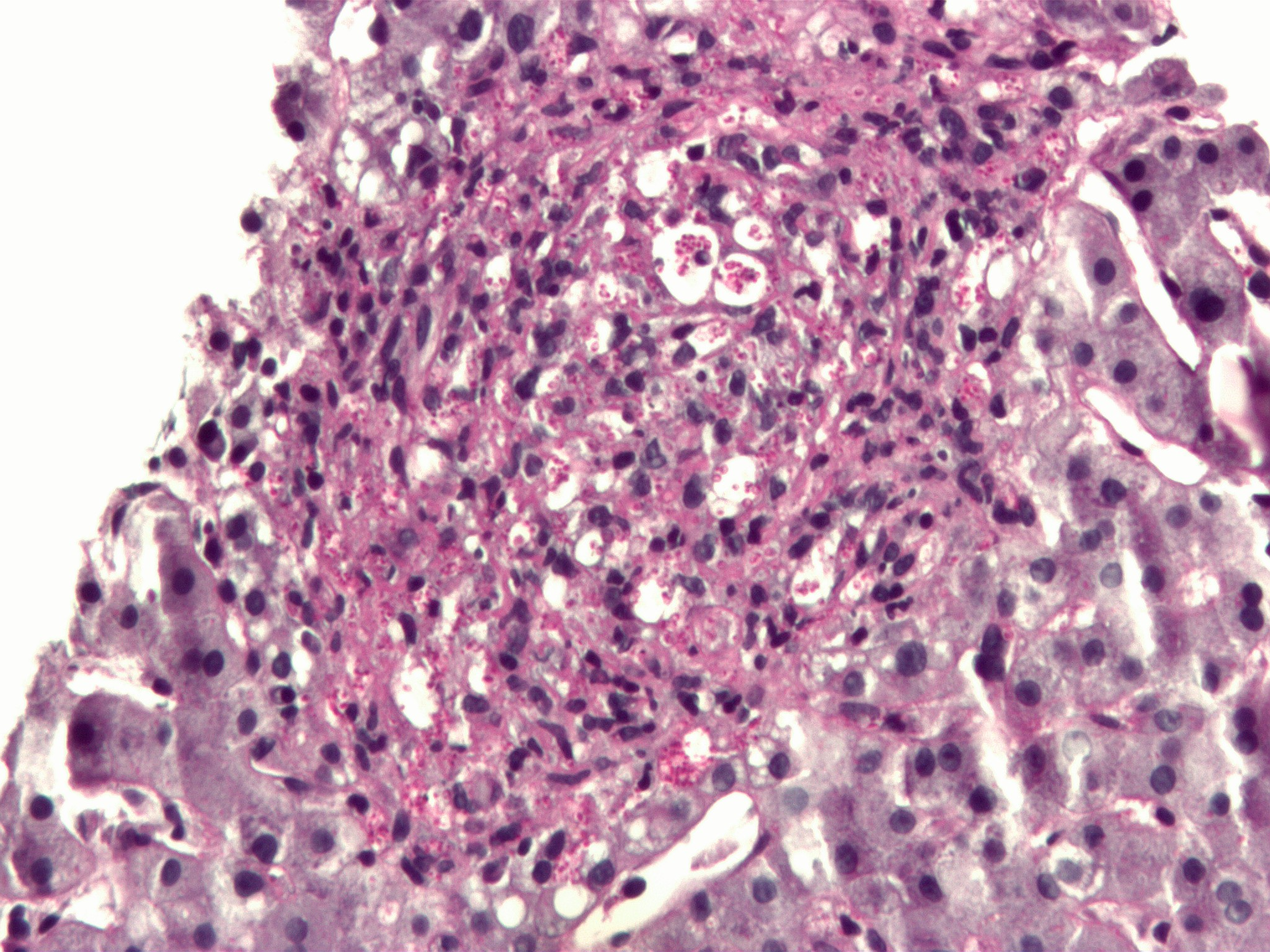
Histoplasma in a granuloma. PAS diastase stain.

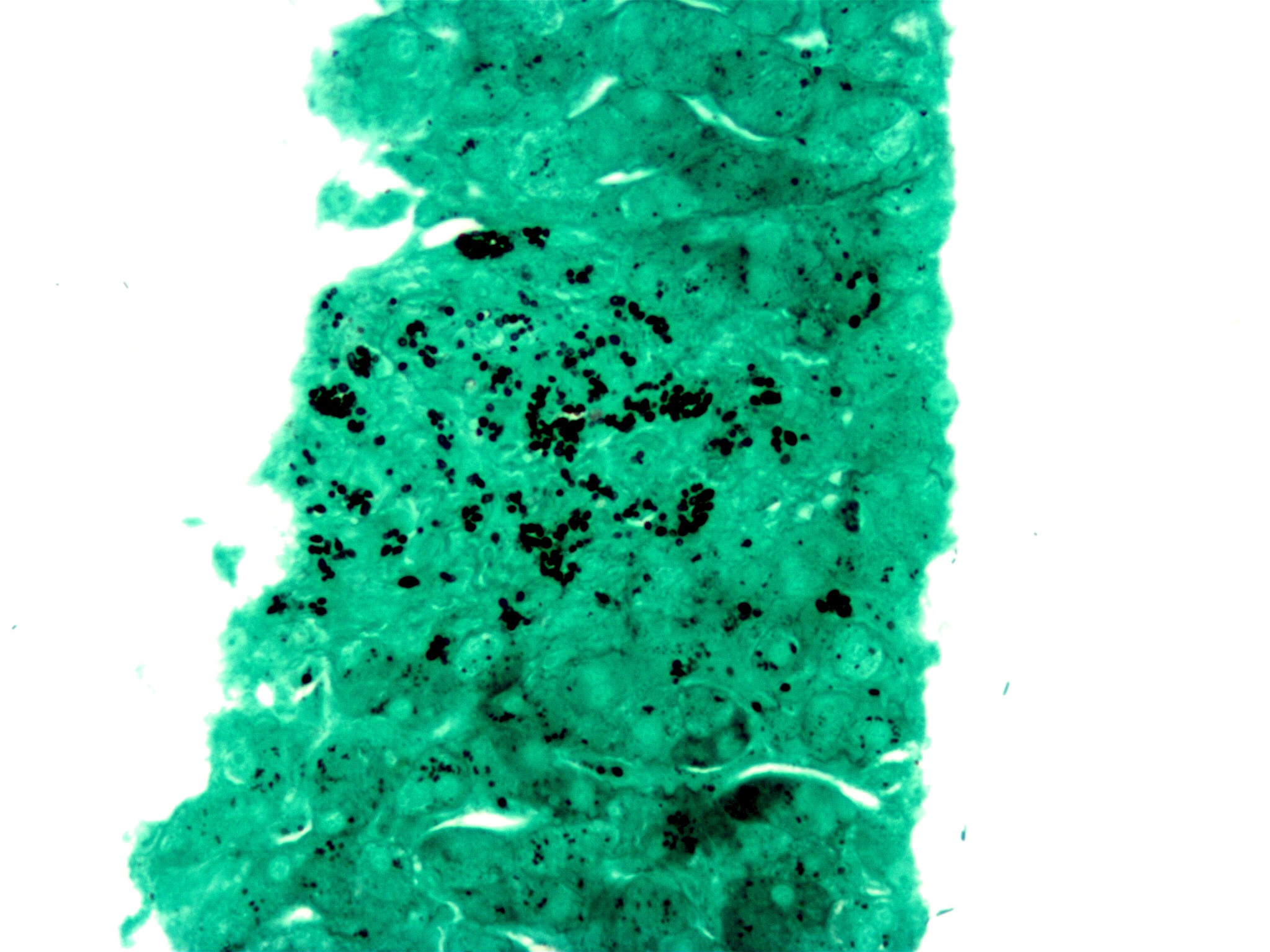
Histoplasma in a granuloma. GMS stain.

== See also ==
- Blastomyces
- Coccidioides
