= Thomas Gilchrist =

Thomas Gilchrist may refer to:

- Thomas Gilchrist (footballer), Scottish footballer
- Thomas Caspar Gilchrist, professor of dermatology

== See also ==
- Gilchrist–Thomas process, a historical process for refining pig iron
