= Dimorphic fungus =

Fungi that can exist as mold or yeast

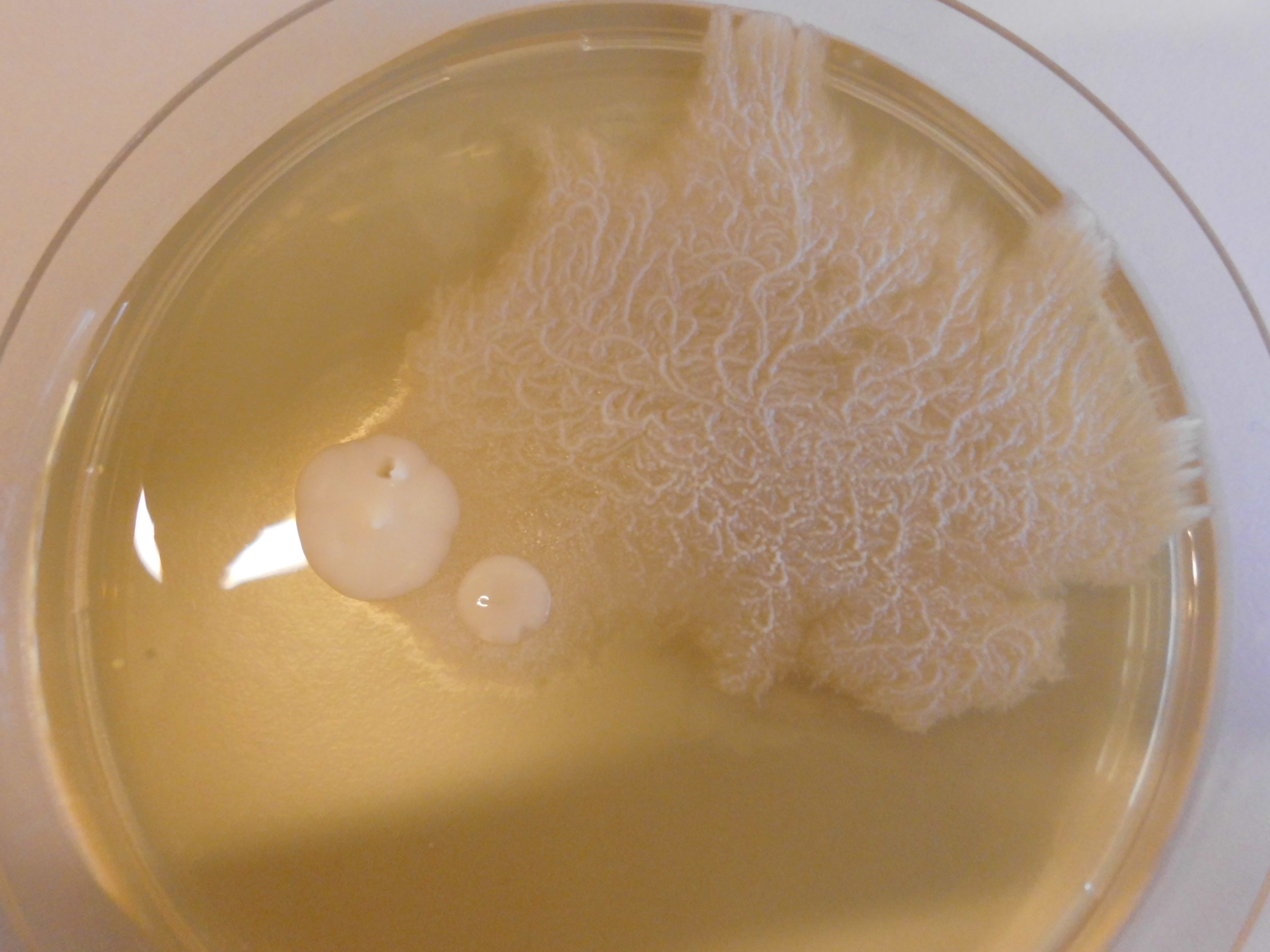
Candida albicans growing as yeast cells and filamentous (hypha) cells

A dimorphic fungus is a fungus that can exist in the form of both mold and yeast. As this is usually brought about by a change in temperature, this fungus type is also described as a thermally dimorphic fungus. An example is Talaromyces marneffei, a human pathogen that grows as a mold at room temperature, and as a yeast at human body temperature.

The term dimorphic is commonly used for fungi that can grow both as yeast and filamentous cells, however many of these dimorphic fungi actually can grow in more than these two forms. Dimorphic is thus often used as a general reference for fungi being able to switch between yeast and filamentous cells, but not necessary limiting more shapes. (Note: e.g. Candida albicans, Paracoccidioides brasiliensis, Sporothrix schenckii, Histoplasma capsulatum and Coccidioides immitis are commonly referred to as being dimorphic, however they can be seen as pleomorphic or polyphenic as they can adopt more morphologies than just yeast or filamentous cells.)

== Ecology of dimorphic fungi ==
Several species of dimorphic fungi are important pathogens of humans and other animals, including Coccidioides immitis, Paracoccidioides brasiliensis, Candida albicans, Blastomyces dermatitidis, Histoplasma capsulatum, Sporothrix schenckii, and Emergomyces sp. Some diseases caused by dimorphic fungi are:

- sporotrichosis
- blastomycosis
- histoplasmosis
- coccidioidomycosis
- paracoccidioidomycosis
- talaromycosis
- candidiasis
- emergomycosis

Many other fungi, including the plant pathogen Ustilago maydis and the cheesemaker's fungus Geotrichum candidum also have dimorphic life cycles.

== Mnemonics ==
In medical Mycology, these memory aids help students remember that among human pathogens, dimorphism largely reflects temperature:

- Mold in the Cold, Yeast in the Heat (Beast)
- Body Heat Probably (Changes) Shape
  - Blastomyces dermatitidis, Histoplasma capsulatum, Paracoccidioides brasiliensis, (Coccidioides immitis) is in parentheses because it changes to a spherule of endospores, not yeast, in the heat), Sporothrix schenckii.
  - This phrase says "Probably" because there is always an exception (in this case fungi like Candida albicans) which change in the opposite direction: to mold in the heat!
