= Ajellomyces =

Scientific classification
- Kingdom: Fungi
- Division: Ascomycota
- Class: Eurotiomycetes
- Order: Onygenales
- Family: Ajellomycetaceae
- Genus: Ajellomyces; McDonough & A.L.Lewis (1968)

Type species
- Ajellomyces dermatitidis McDonough & A.L.Lewis (1968)

Species
- Ajellomyces capsulatus Ajellomyces crescens

Genus of fungi

Ajellomyces is a genus of fungi in the division Ascomycota, in the family Ajellomycetaceae. The genus contains two species, which have a widespread distribution, especially in tropical areas. The species Ajellomyces capsulatus is significant to human health as the causative agent of histoplasmosis. This species is more usually referred to as Histoplasma capsulatum, with the designation Ajellomyces capsulatus referring to the ascomycetous perfect stage.
