= Antibiotics and Chemotherapy =

- Discipline: Chemotherapy
- Language: English
- Edited by: A. Dalhoff, H. Schönfeld

Publication details
- Former name(s): Antibiotica et Chemotherapia: Fortschritte. Advances. Progrès
- History: 1954-2000
- Publisher: Karger Publishers

Standard abbreviations
- ISO 4: Antibiot. Chemother.

Indexing
- ISSN: 0066-4758 (print); 1662-2863 (web)
- OCLC no.: 1344164

Links
- Journal homepage

Antibiotics and Chemotherapy was a peer-reviewed medical journal covering antimicrobial and cancer chemotherapy published by Karger Publishers. It was established in 1954 as Antibiotica et Chemotherapia: Fortschritte. Advances. Progrès, obtaining its current name in 1971. It ceased publication in 2000.
