= Emergomyces =

Scientific classification
- Kingdom: Fungi
- Division: Ascomycota
- Class: Eurotiomycetes
- Order: Onygenales
- Family: Ajellomycetaceae
- Genus: Emergomyces; Dukik, Sigler & de Hoog (2017)

Type species
- Emergomyces pasteurianus (Drouhet, E. Guého & Gori) Dukik, Sigler & de Hoog (2017)

Species
- Emergomyces africanus Emergomyces canadensis Emergomyces crescens Emergomyces europaeus Emergomyces orientalis Emergomyces pasteurianus Emergomyces soli

Genus of fungi

Emergomyces is a genus of fungi in the order Onygenales. Species are known human pathogens and show thermal dimorphism, converting from hyphal states under saprobic conditions to yeast-like states under pathogenic conditions. They are the causative agents of emergomycosis, a systemic mycosis in immunocompromised patients. The name Emergomyces refers to these newly emerging mycoses, only encountered in the last few decades.
