= Rhoda Williams Benham =

American mycologist

- Born: December 5, 1894; Cedarhurst, New York, United States
- Died: January 17, 1957 (aged 62)
- Education: Barnard College; Columbia University
- Scientific career
- Fields: Mycology Botany Dermatology

Rhoda Williams Benham (December 5, 1894 – January 17, 1957) was an American mycologist, taxonomist, and pioneer of the field of medical mycology. Throughout her career, she taught and trained many medical mycologists at Columbia University, while also conducting and publishing fundamental research in the field. Her most renowned works include her publications on the genus Candida, which established her as an authority on the yeast-like fungi pathogenic to man.

== Biography ==
Benham was born in Cedarhurst, New York on December 5, 1894. Her family, although living for some time in Long Island, had a long New England ancestry and constituted a close-knit group, the warmth and devotion of which had a tremendous influence on Benham's life. Though she maintained an apartment in New York for years, she spent her weekends and vacations in Cedarhurst where she entertained many of her friends and colleagues. Benham was known for her photography, and enjoyed photographing flowers, trees, her family and friends, as well as her fungi at work. Some of her tree photographs received honorable mention in the Medical Center Personnel's yearly art exhibits.

After completing her primary and secondary education in Cedarhurst, Benham attended Barnard College of Columbia University and received a B.A. degree, majoring in Botany, in 1917. From 1918 to 1925 Benham remained affiliated with the Botany Department at Barnard, as a graduate student and teaching assistant, in Botany. During that time, she received the guidance of four prominent botanists in the Columbia faculty: Herbert M. Richards, R. A. Harper, Bernard O. Dodge, and Tracy Hazen, whose influence shaped her selection of a career. In 1919, Benham received her master's degree in Botany at Columbia under Herbert M. Richards, and began work toward the degree of Doctor of Philosophy. She began a study of the metal nutrition of Aspergillus niger for her thesis, but stopped after being invited by Joseph Gardner Hopkins to join his staff as an Assistant in Dermatology in the diagnostic laboratory in the College of Physicians and Surgeons, New York (now Columbia Medical School). Here, she began to study pathogenic fungi, and published her renown thesis: "Certain Monilias Parasitic on Man, their Identification by Morphology and by Agglutination," for her Ph.D. in Botany in 1931. This particular work was the first to use immunologic principles as a taxonomic tool in the study of pathogenic fungi, and is today regarded a classic.

In 1935, Benham, in collaboration with Joseph Gardner Hopkins and Bernard O. Dodge, organized the first comprehensive course on medical mycology and directed the first medical mycology research laboratory in the United States. Her Medical Mycology course at Columbia University was the first of its kind, and it prompted the establishment of similar courses at other academic institutions. With the support of a substantial grant from the Rockefeller Foundation and recruiters like Hopkins and Dodge, her laboratory successfully nurtured many young scholars who later became prominent medical mycologists, including: Beatrice M. Kesten, Chester W. Emmons, Mary E. Hopper, Arturo L. Carrion, Edward De Lamater, Otis Jillson, V. Medd Henington, Lucille Georg, Floriante Bocobo, Roland Riddell, Jose Miranda, Milton Huppert, and Edith Schnall. She assisted Elizabeth Lee Hazen in learning mycology.

Benham was a dedicated teacher and academic, with involvement in many scientific societies and organizations, including: The Society of the Sigma Xi, the Harvey Society, the Microbiological Section of the New York Academy of Medicine, the Society of Investigative Dermatology, the Society of American Bacteriologists, the New York Academy of Sciences, the American Association for the Advancement of Science, and the Mycological Society of America. She also served on the Medical Mycology Committee, charged with preparing nomenclature proposals for the International Botanical Congress in Stockholm in 1950, where her proposal to conserve the generic name Candida for the medicinal monilias was adopted. Benham was one of the original editors of the international publication Mycopathologia, as well as of the chapter on "Pathogenic Fungi" for the fourth edition of Diagnostic Procedures and Reagents of the American Public Health Association. She was also the author of the chapter "Pathogenic Fungi" in Agents of Disease and Host Resistance by Gay et al. Though her health began to fail in 1948, she served as a consultant in mycology to Commissioner of Health for the State of New York Herman E. Hilleboe upon his request from 1948 through 1953.

In 1948, Benham had a heart attack which required hospitalization, and subsequently resulted in her absence from her laboratory for nearly a year. She recovered enough to resume active duty for several more years, and completed her work on the genus Beauveria, as well as additional work on the Cryptococci and dermatophytes, during this time. Her health declined again in the summer of 1955 and she was unable to return to the laboratory, forcing her to retire prematurely as Associate Professor in the Department of Dermatology at Columbia. However, she continued to write, completing the manuscripts for her final two papers. She died on January 17, 1957, after spending one and a half years in her Cedarhurst home. Benham was an Episcopalian, and was buried at her family parish in Hewlett, New York.

== Publications ==
Benham has published 43 times over her career. She was primarily a taxonomist, and incorporated both morphology and biochemical behavior, including nutrition, antigenic resemblances, and virulence, in her studies and publications. Her thesis work Certain Monilias Parasitic on Man, their Identification by Morphology and by Agglutination was first in the application of immunologic principles as a taxonomic tool in the study of pathogenic fungi, and is regarded as a classic. At the time, the numerous species of Candida, referred to as "medical monilias", provided a perplexing challenge. Her meticulous analysis of strains labeled Monilia psilosis, Endomyces albicans, and even Saccharomyces and Blastomyces revealed that the majority of fermenting yeast-like fungi isolated from human lesions were identical and belonged to a single species, Candida (Monilia) albicans. Benham further described characteristics that may be used to distinguish this species from others including: 'C. krusei, C. parapsilosis, and C. tropicalis. For studying their microscopic morphology, she advocated corn meal infusion agar, a culture medium that, when produced according to her method, remains unrivaled for the rapid induction of the diagnostic chlamydospores of C. albicans. She revealed antigenic differences and similarities among the numerous species in this group by developing specific antisera in rabbits.

Her extensive 1935 investigation of pathogenic yeast recovered from humans proved that clinical isolates described as Cryptococcus, Saccharomyces, and Torula by Busse, Curtis, and others were all the same species, which she termed Cryptococcus. Her subsequent publication in 1950 established Cryptococcus neoformans as the formally accepted taxon. Benham’s publications on the genus Candida, as well as a comparable treatment of the genus Cryptococcus, cemented her authority on human-pathogenic, yeast-like fungi.

Benham’s research, however, was not limited to these two taxa. Her works on Phoma condiogena, Sporotrichum schenkii, Pityrosporum ovale, Allescheria boydii, the genus Beauveria, and the dermatophytes, demonstrate her wide range of fungal interests and scope of knowledge. Similarly, her publications on dermatophyte nutrition, many of which were co-authored with her students and associates, have considerably increased understanding of this topic, as well as the available information in this field.

Her bibliography is extensive, including contributions on medical mycology subjects to scholarly articles and the proceedings of societies in which she was a member. A comprehensive list of Rhoda Williams Benham’s publications can be seen below.

=== List of publications ===
1. Monilia infections of the hands and feet. New York State Jour. Med. 29: 793-800. 1929. (With J. G. Hopkins.)
2. Asthma due to a fungus, Alternaria. Jour. A. M. A. 94: 6-10. 1930. (With J. G. Hopkins and B. M. Kesten.)
3. Sensitization to saprophytic fungi in a case of eczema. Proc. Soc. Exp. Biol. Med. 27: 342-344. 1930. (With J. G. Hopkins and B. M. Kesten.)
4. Certain monilias parasitic on man; their identification by morphology and by agglutination. Jour. Infect. Dis. 49: 183-215. 1931.
5. Phonma condiogcna, an excitant in asthma: some observations on the development and cultural characteristics. Bull. Torrey Bot. Club 58: 203-214. 1931.
6. Monilias, yeasts and cryptococci; their pathogenicity, classification and identification. Am. Jour. Pub. Health 22: 502-504. 1932.
7. Sporotrichosis in New York State. New York State Jour. Med. 32: 595-601. 1932. (With J. G. Hopkins.)
8. Sporotrichosis: its transmission to plants and animals. Jour. Infect. Dis. 50: 437-458. 1932. (With B. M. Kesten.)
9. Fungus infections of the skin and its appendages occurring in Puerto Rico; a clinical and mycologic study. Arch. Derm. Syph. 25: 1046-1057. 1932. (With B. M. Kesten, B. K. Ashford, C. W. Emmons and M. C. Moss.)
10. Vegetable parasites that attack both plant and human life. Jour. New York Bot. Garden 33: 149-153. 1932.
11. Yeast-like fungi found on the skin and in the intestines of normal subjects; a survey of 100 persons. Arch. Derm. Syph. 28: 532-543. 1933. (With A. McH. Hopkins.)
12. The fungi of blastomycosis and coccidioidal granuloma. Arch. Derm. Syph. 30: 385-400. 1934.
13. The terminology of the cryptococci with a note on Cryptococcus mollis. Mycologia 27: 496-502. 1935.
14. Cryptococci-their identification by morphology and by serology. Jour. Infect. Dis. 57: 255-274. 1935.
15. Pathogenic Fungi; Chapter 45 in "Agents of Disease & Host Resistance," Gay et al., Ch. C. Thomas, Springfield. 1935.
16. Experimental studies with the dermatophytes. 1. Primary disease in laboratory animals. Jour. Invest. Dermat. 1: 451-467. 1938. (With E. D. DeLamater.)
17. Experimental studies with the dermatophytes. 2. Immunity and hypersensitivity produced in laboratory animals. Jour. Invest. Dermat. 1: 469-488. 1938. (With E. D. DeLamater.)
18. The fungi causing deep-seated infections: their diagnostic characteristics and classification. Proc. 6th Pacific Sci. Congress 5: 863-872. 1939.
19. The cultural characteristics of Pityrosporum ovale-a lipophylic fungus. Jour. Invest. Dermat. 2: 187-203. 1939.
20. Cultural characteristics of Pityrosporum ovalec-a lipophylic fungus. Nutrient and growth requirements. Proc. Soc. Exp. Biol. Med. 46: 176-178. 1941.
21. The nutrient and growth requirements of Pityrosporum ovale-a lipophylic fungus. (Abstract) Torreya 41: 68-69. 1941.
22. Laboratory procedures in the diagnosis of fungus diseases. Proc. New York State Assoc. Pub. Health Labs. 24: 69-82. 1944.
23. Pityrosporum ovalc-a lipophylic fungus. Thiamin and oxaloacetic acid as growth factors. Proc. Soc. Exp. Biol. Med. 58: 199-201. 1945.
24. Biology of Pityrosporum ovalc. Chapter 4 in Nickerson's "Biology of Patho- genic Fungi," Ann. Cryptogam. Pytopathol. VI, Chronica Botanica Pub. Co., Waltham, Mass. 1947.
25. Allescheria boydii, causative agent in a case of meningitis. Jour. Invest. Dermat. 10: 99-110. 1948. (With L. K. Georg.)
26. Effect of nutrition on growth and morphology of the dermatophytes. 1. Devel- opment of macroconidia in Trichophyton rubrum. Mycologia 40: 232-240. 1948.
27. Pigment production in the differentiation of Trichophyton mentagrophytes and Trichophyton rubrum. Mycologia 41: 291-302. 1949. (With F. C. Bocobo.)
28. Cryptococcosis and blastomycosis. Ann. New York Acad. Sci. 50: 1299-1314. 1950.
29. The Laboratory of Medical Mycology. The Biopsy 2: 1-2. 1950.
30. Nutritional studies of the dermatophytes with special reference to Trichophyton megnini Blanchard 1896 and Trichophyton gallinae (Megnin 1881), comb. nov. Jour. Invest. Dermat. 18: 453-472. 1952. (With M. Silva.)
31. An unusual finding in Epidermophyton floccosumn. Jour. Invest. Dermat. 19: 315-317. 1952. (With P. McCormack.)
32. Nutritional studies of the dermatophytes-effect on growth and morphology, with special reference to the production of macroconidia. Trans. New York Acad. Sci. 15: 102-106. 1953.
33. Maduromycosis of the central nervous system. Jour. Neuropath. & Exp. Neurol. 12: 158-168. 1953. (With S. M. Aronson and A. Wolf.)
34. The genus Beauveria, morphological and taxonomical studies of several species and of two strains isolated from wharf-piling borers. Mycologia 45: 727- 746. 1953. (With J. L. Miranda.)
35. Chemical analysis of the capsular substance of Cryptococcus neoformans. Jour. Invest. Dermat. 22: 279-283. 1954. (With J. M. Einbinder and C. T. Nelson.)
36. Nutritional studies of the dermatophytes with special reference to the red- pigment producing varieties of Trichophyton mentagrophytes. Jour. Invest. Dermat. 22: 285-294. 1954. (With M. Silva.)
37. Treatment of onychomyocis due to Trichophyton rubrum. A. M. A. Arch. Dermat. 71: 52-55. 1955. (With B. M. Kesten and M. Silva.)
38. The genus Cryptococcus: the present status and criteria for the identification of species. Trans. New York Acad. Sci. 17: 418-429. 1955.
39. Cryptococcus neoformans: "an ascomycete." Proc. Soc. Exp. Biol. Med. 89. 243-245. 1955.
40. Trichophyton rubrum infections: a clinical, mycologic and experimental study. Jour. Invest. Dermat. 25: 311-328. 1955. (With M. Silva and B. M. Kesten.)
41. The genus Cryptococcus. Bact. Reviews 20: 189-200. 1956.
42. Species of Candida most frequently isolated from man: methods and criteria for their identification. Jour. Chronic Dis. 5: 460-472. 1957.
43. The chlamydospores of Candida albicans: comparison of three media for their induction. Jour. Lab. & Clin. Med. 1957. (in press-posthumously) (With J. D. Pollack.)

== Awards and honors ==
Rhoda Williams Benham won numerous awards for her photography. Some of her tree photographs, which were enlarged from black and white negatives, received honorable mention in the Medical Center Personnel's yearly art exhibits. Using her photography, Benham put together excellent exhibits that she and her colleagues presented at several annual conventions of the American Medical Association, as well as one convention each of the American Public Health Association, the Society of American Bacteriologists, and the Ninth International Dermatological Congress in Budapest in 1935. For their excellence, many of these displays received gold medals or certificates of recognition.

In Benham’s honor, the Medical Mycological Society of the Americas rewards exceptional contributions to the field of medical mycology with an annual prize. For her extensive contributions to medical mycology, and science in general, the fungus Trichophyton benhamiae was named in her honor.

== Legacy ==
Benham amassed a sizable culture collection throughout the years, contributing significantly to the field. Her photography illustrates patients, fungal cultures (both gross and microscopic), and histologic sections from infected tissues, exhibiting both deep and superficial mycoses.

Rhoda Williams Benham's many associates, students, and fellow mycologists throughout the world recognize her significant contributions to the study of pathogenic fungi. As a co-founder of the first laboratory for medical mycology research and teaching in the United States with the late Joseph Gardner Hopkins, she is considered a pioneer in the field.
