= Thomas Caspar Gilchrist =

American dermatologist

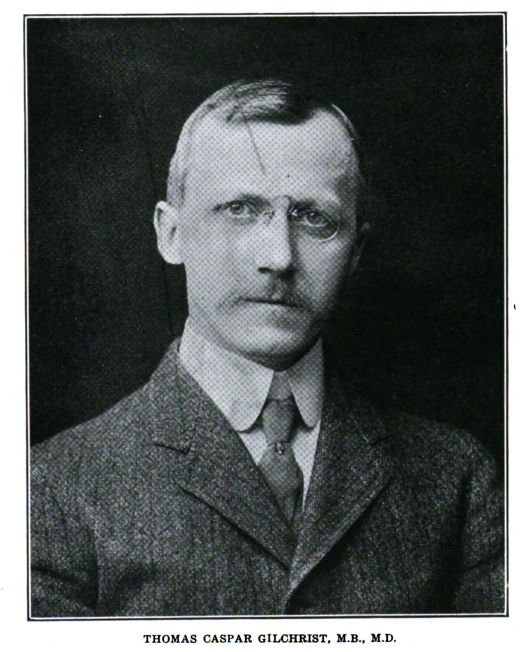
- Born: 15 June 1862
- Died: 14 November 1927 (aged 65)
- Known for: Gilchrist's disease
- Medical career
- Profession: Physician
- Institutions: University of Maryland; Johns Hopkins Hospital

Thomas Caspar Gilchrist (15 June 1862 – 14 November 1927) was professor of dermatology at the University of Maryland before taking up the same position at the Johns Hopkins Hospital, Baltimore. He wrote on acne, erysipelas, X-ray dermatitis, porokeratosis, sarcoma of skin, and fatty atrophy. The fungal infection Gilchrist's disease, more commonly known as blastomycosis, is named for him after he first mistook it as a protozoan disease before correctly identifying it as a fungal in origin. The organism that causes it, Blastomyces dermatitidis, was subsequently described by him and William Royal Stokes in 1894.
