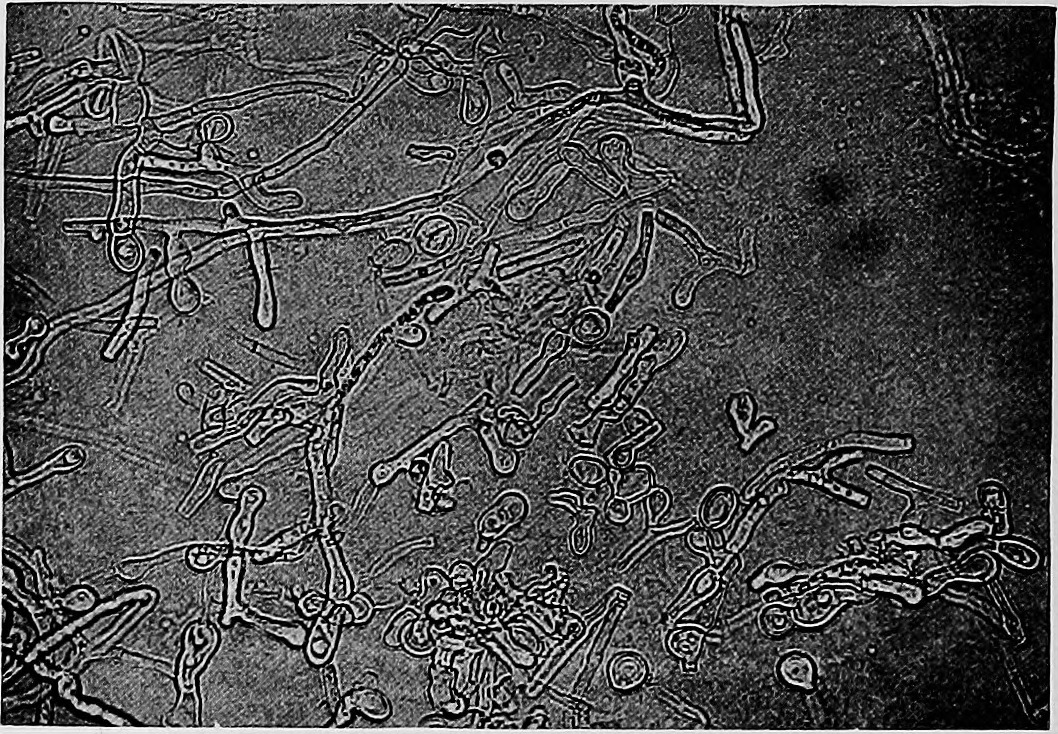
- Blastomyces dermatitidis

Scientific classification
- Domain: Eukaryota
- Kingdom: Fungi
- Division: Ascomycota
- Class: Eurotiomycetes
- Order: Onygenales
- Family: Ajellomycetaceae
- Genus: Blastomyces; Gilchrist & W.R. Stokes (1898)

Type species
- Blastomyces dermatitidis Gilchrist & W.R. Stokes (1898)

Species
- Blastomyces dermatitidis Blastomyces emzantsi Blastomyces gilchristii Blastomyces helicus Blastomyces parvus Blastomyces percusus Blastomyces silverae

Synonyms
- Ajellomyces McDonough & A.L. Lewis (1968); Emmonsia Cif. & Montemart. (1959)

= Blastomyces =

Genus of fungi

Blastomyces is a genus of fungi in the order Onygenales. Species are known human pathogens and show thermal dimorphism, converting from hyphal states under saprobic conditions to yeast-like states under pathogenic conditions. They are the causative agents of blastomycosis, a systemic mycosis in immunocompromised patients.

Blastomyces Gilchrist & W.R. Stokes (1898) was an illegitimate homonym of Blastomyces Costantin & Rolland (1888) (a synonym of Chrysosporium), but has now been conserved against the earlier name because of its widespread use in clinical literature. Teleomorphs (sexual states) were formerly referred to the genus Ajellomyces, but, following changes to the International Code of Nomenclature for algae, fungi, and plants, the practice of giving different names to teleomorph and anamorph forms of the same fungus was discontinued.
