= William Royal Stokes =

American bacteriologist

William Royal Stokes (1870 – February 9, 1930) was Baltimore City's bacteriologist. While investigating the 1929–1930 psittacosis pandemic, he contracted psittacosis and died. An annual lecture, a library dedicated to bacteriology and a street are named for him.
