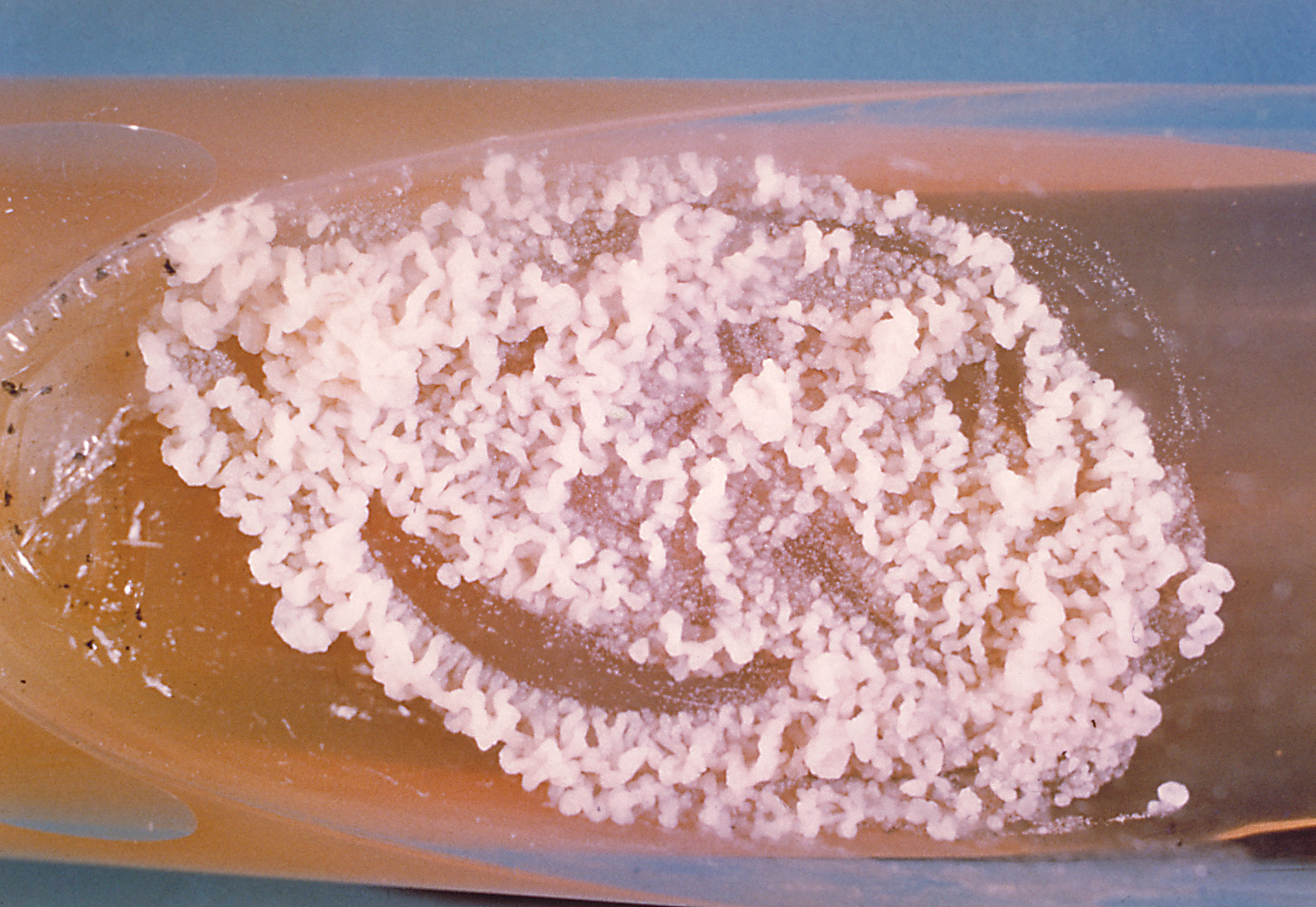
- Paracoccidioides brasiliensis slant culture

Scientific classification
- Kingdom: Fungi
- Division: Ascomycota
- Class: Eurotiomycetes
- Order: Onygenales
- Family: Ajellomycetaceae; Unter., J.A.Scott & Sigler (2004)

Type genus
- Ajellomyces McDonough & A.L.Lewis (1968)

Genera
- Blastomyces; Emergomyces; Emmonsiellopsis; Helicocarpus; Histoplasma; Paracoccidioides; Polytolypa

Synonyms
- Paracoccidioidaceae

= Ajellomycetaceae =

Family of fungi

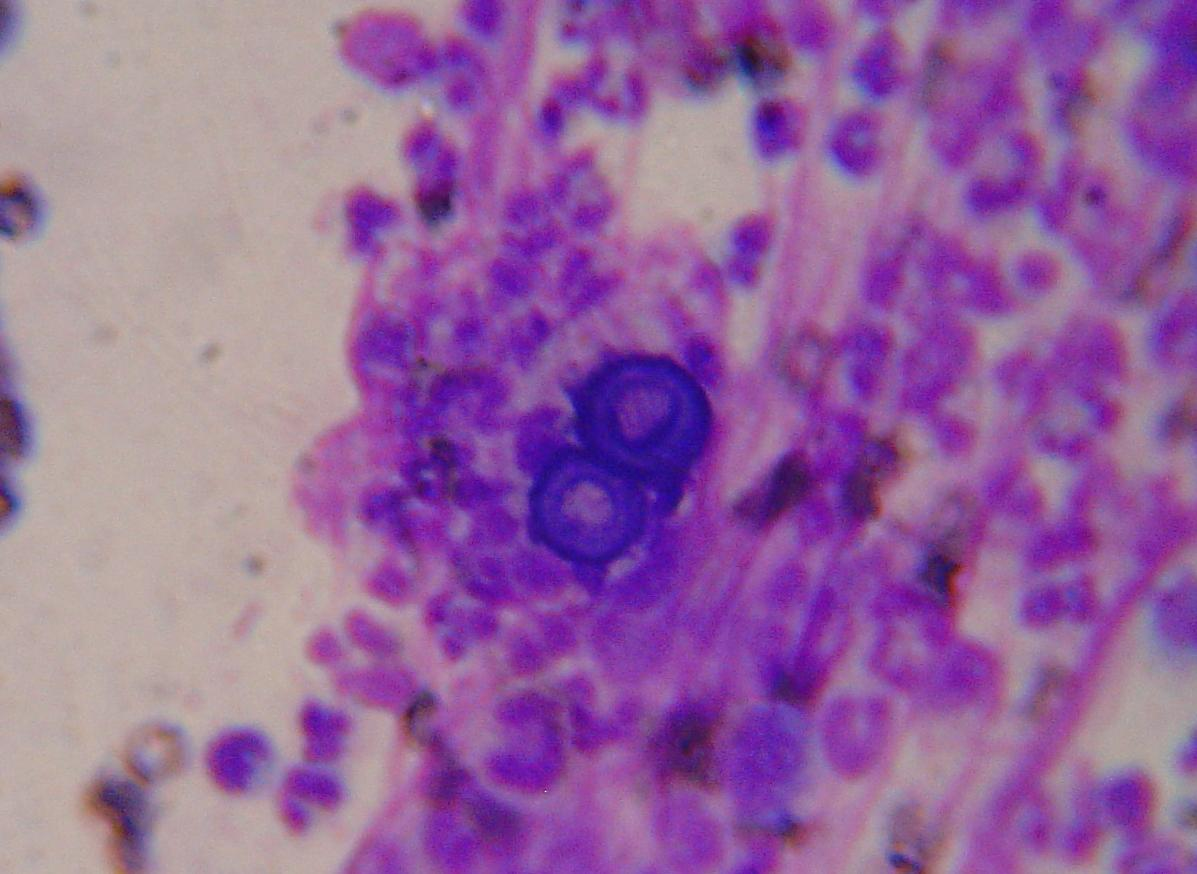
Blastomyces dermatitidis

The Ajellomycetaceae are a family of fungi in the Ascomycota, class Eurotiomycetes.
