= Alfred Boquet =

French veterinarian (1879–1947)

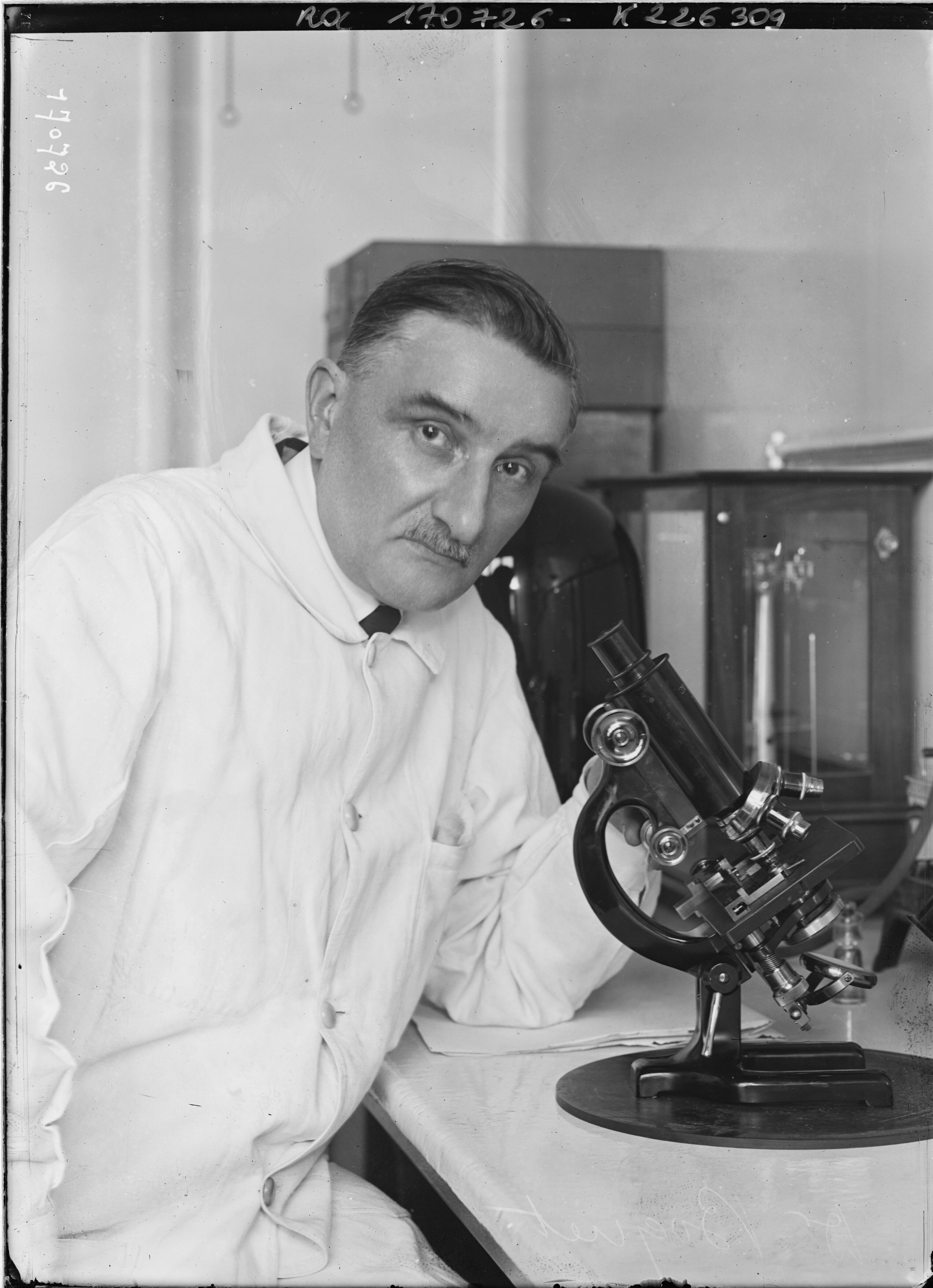
Alfred Boquet in 1933.

Alfred Boquet (né Alfred Henri Jules Boquet; 26 December 1879 – 3 June 1947) was a French veterinarian and biologist born in Cires-lès-Mello.

== Background ==
Boquet was born in Cires-lès-Mello to Alfred Prudent Boquet and Marie Jenny Bréchot (maiden).

In 1901, he graduated from veterinary school in Toulouse, spending the following years (1902-1910) as a government veterinary health employee in Algeria. In 1911, he began work as a veterinarian at the Pasteur Institute in Algiers, afterwards being promoted to chef de laboratoire (1913). From 1919 to 1931, he was laboratory chief (tuberculosis services) at the Pasteur Institute in Paris, where he later served as head of tuberculosis services from 1931 to 1947.

At the Pasteur Institute in Algiers he participated in development of the "anticlaveleux-vaccine", a vaccine used for rapid vaccination of millions of sheep in North Africa and Europe. In Algiers with Léopold Nègre (1879-1961), he conducted research on epizootic lymphangitis, a disease affecting horses and mules caused by Cryptococcus farciminosus.

In Paris he performed studies on Mycobacterium tuberculosis, pseudo-tuberculosis of rodents, the bubonic plague in humans, ulcerative lymphangitis, paratuberculosis in cattle and anthrax. With Léopold Nègre he developed antigène méthylique (antigen-methyl) for treatment of tuberculosis.

He became a member of the Société de biologie in 1919, a chevalier of the Légion d'honneur in 1923 (officer, 1939), general secretary of the Annales de l'Institut Pasteur in 1928 and a member of the Académie de Médecine (veterinary division) in 1947.

== Written works ==
- Sur les principales affections contagieuses des animaux de l'Afrique du Nord (On the primary infectious diseases of animals of North Africa), 1914.
- Lymphangite epizootique des solipèdes : contribution a l'ètude des mycoses (Epizootic lymphangitis in solipeds: contribution to the study of fungi) with Léopold Nègre, 1920.
- Manuel technique de microbiologie (Technical Manual of Microbiology and Serology) with Albert Calmette and Léopold Nègre), 1925.
- Antigénothérapie de la tuberculose par les extraits méthyliques de bacilles de Koch (Antigen therapy of tuberculosis by extracts of tubercle bacilli methyl) with Léopold Nègre, preface by Albert Calmette; 1927.
- Le traitement de la tuberculose par l'antigène méthylique (antigénothérapie) (Treatment of tuberculosis by antigen-methyl (antigen therapy) with Léopold Nègre, 1932.
