= Histoplasma duboisii =

Scientific classification
- Kingdom: Fungi
- Division: Ascomycota
- Class: Eurotiomycetes
- Order: Onygenales
- Family: Ajellomycetaceae
- Genus: Histoplasma
- Species: H. duboisii

Binomial name
- Histoplasma duboisii Vanbreus. (1952)

Synonyms
- Histoplasma capsulatum var. duboisii (Vanbreus.) Cif. (1960)

Species of fungus

Histoplasma duboisii is a saprotrophic fungus responsible for the invasive infection known as African histoplasmosis. This species is a close relative of Histoplasma capsulatum, the agent of classical histoplasmosis, and the two occur in similar habitats. Histoplasma duboisii is restricted to continental Africa and Madagascar, although scattered reports have arisen from other places usually in individuals with an African travel history. Like, H. capsulatum, H. duboisii is thermally dimorphic – growing as a filamentous fungus at ambient temperature (25 °C) and a yeast at body temperature (37 °C). It differs morphologically from H. capsulatum by the typical production of a large-celled yeast form. Both agents cause similar forms of disease, although H. duboisii predominantly causes cutaneous and subcutaneous disease in humans and non-human primates. The agent responds to many antifungal drug therapies used to treat serious fungal diseases.

== History ==
Histoplasmosis was first reported from the African continent in 1942. These early reports implicated strains that produced larger yeast cell forms than H. capsulatum, and the Irish mycologist James Thompson Duncan suggested they might represent a distinct taxon. The fungus was described as a new species by Raymond Vanbreuseghem in 1952 based on isolates provided to him by Professor Albert Dubois, director of the Prince Léopold Institute for Tropical Medicine in Antwerp, Belgium, and the species was named in honour of Dubois. Five years after its description, Professor Edouard Drouhet of the Pasteur Institute in Paris reduced the taxon to synonymy with H. capsulatum, designating it as a variant. However, since the 1960s the fungus has been generally accepted as a separate species from H. capsulatum.

== Morphology ==
Histoplasma duboisii is a dimorphic fungus, growing as either a yeast-like form or a filamentous form depending on the prevailing nutritional and temperature conditions. It is unusual to find both the mycelial and yeast forms co-existing. The mycelial form is characterized by white and cottony colonies that turn brownish with age. The underside of the colony is typically brownish in colour. It is morphologically similar to the closely related species, H. capsulatum, producing warted aleurioconidia though not as prolifically as H. capsulatum. Unlike the small-celled yeast produced by H. capsulatum, H. duboisii initially produces small yeast cells (2–5 μm in diameter) but later develops a mixture of small and large cells after 3–4 weeks in culture culminating in the culture being dominated by large yeast cells (10–15 μm in diameter). The yeast form of H. duboisii are oval in shape with thick cell walls composed of galactomannan intermixed with β-(1,4)-glucan. Cells of H. duboisii have a different fatty acid profile than those of H. capsulatum, and these differences have been suggested to relate to differences in cell sizes between the two species.

The identity of H. duboisii can be ascertained by conventional laboratory methods involving mycelial-to-yeast conversion on brain-heart infusion medium supplemented with sheep blood and either glutamine or cysteine, and microscopic verification of the size of yeast cells. A further feature differentiating the yeast forms of H. duboisii and H. capsulatum is the tendency of buds of the former species to remain attached by a narrow isthmus such that the mother and daughter cells resemble an hourglass just prior to cell release. Unlike H. capsulatum, H. duboisii lacks the ability to produce the enzyme urease, and this feature can be used for confirmatory identification. Clinical isolates of H. duboisii belong predominantly to the "–" mating type.

== Ecology and epidemiology ==
Histoplasma duboisii is restricted to regions on the African continent lying between the Tropics of Cancer and the Capricorn. The species is the etiological agent of African histoplamosis, and is endemic throughout western and central Africa in addition to Madagascar. These regions share a similarly stable climate in terms of relative humidity and rainfall. Like H. capsulatum, the agent of classical histoplasmosis, H. duboisii is associated with chicken runs and bat caves. The first described natural reservoir of H. duboisii was a bat cave in Nigeria that yielded samples of the dirt mixed with guano testing positive for H. duboisii exoantigen. Intestinal contents from 13% of healthy bats collected from the location tested positive for the fungus.

== Disease in humans ==
Histoplasma duboisii infections have been known to occur in HIV patients in endemic zones, particularly in individuals whose CD4+ cell count is below 50 cells/mm^{3}. These infections are often of the disseminated type. Unlike classical histoplasmosis, infections caused by H. duboisii are often restricted to the skin or subcutaneous layer occasionally involving bone. It is most frequently seen in immunodeficient individuals although the disease is well known in the immunocompetent. Lung disease manifesting as classical miliary infiltrates and nodular lesions has also been recorded. Superficial cutaneous lesions are characterized by nodules and papules that may ulcerate at a later stage of disease progression. A hyperpigmented halo sometimes surrounds the nodule. Subcutaneous lesions are warm, firm and tender, sometimes rupturing to release a yellowish discharge containing the fungus prior to evolving into cold abscesses. Subcutaneous lesions may also develop draining sinuses. Lesions can be localised or disseminated, appearing simultaneously and sometimes in large numbers. Disseminated disease is especially common in immunocompromised individuals, and can involve any organs but infection of the heart and central nervous system are rare. Dissemination to lymph nodes and visceral organs is associated with high mortality. The ability of yeast cells to multiply within phagocytic cells contributes to the formation of pus-producing necrotic granulomas. Uncommonly, both H. duboisii and H. capsulatum have been found to co-occur in immunosuppressed patients with HIV disease. It has also been known to co-occur with Aspergillus fumigatus, Pseudallescheria boydii, Microsporum gypseum, Malbranchea gypsea and species of Chrysosporium. Fewer than 300 cases reports of African histoplasmosis are known prior to 2007, and the disease is thought to be significantly under-reported.

Cutaneous disease can take several forms:

1. Primary disease (following direct inoculation)
  - Superficial
  - Subcutaneous
2. Secondary disease (arising from dissemination of pre-existing infection, e.g., osteomyelitis)

=== Diagnosis ===
Due to the wide variety of clinical presentations, diagnosis of disease related to this agent is often challenging and cannot be accomplished using on clinical features alone. Laboratory confirmation of the organism in biopsy or secretion specimens is necessary. Currently there are no available serological testing procedures available for H. duboisii, and the species is antigenically cross-reactive with the closely related H. capsulatum. The feasibility of a specific polymerase chain reaction-based test for H. duboisii has been suggested, but none is presently available.

=== Distribution and reservoirs ===
Though the agent is thought to be restricted to Africa, emergent cases have been reported elsewhere but nearly always in individuals with a travel history to regions where the agent is endemic. One case of African histoplasmosis has been reported in an otherwise individual from India in the absence of a travel history to endemic countries. The afflicted individual resided in Kerala, an area with an abundant bat populations and a climate similar to that of endemic countries. All age groups are susceptible to infection; however individuals in the third or fourth decade of life as well as children under 10 years of age are at greatest risk. Case reports suggest a strong gender bias in infection, favouring males over females by a factor of two.

The fungus is thought to enter the body mainly by inhalation of airborne microconidia or fragments of vegetative hyphae although transcutaneous infection has been reported. Once exposed, infective cells may remain quiescent for months or years prior to the development of disease. Disseminated disease may arise following the movement of organisms through the lymphatic and circulatory systems.

=== Treatment ===
Isolated lesions may be cleared by surgical removed, although some have been known to heal spontaneously. In contrast, deep lesions and disseminated disease require antifungal drug therapy. To date, no antifungal drug studies have specifically investigated the agent of African histoplasmosis. Hence most treatment approaches are based on the therapeutic strategies used to treat classical histoplasmosis caused by H. capsulatum. Amphotericin B is a mainstay of antifungal treatment, with a recommended dose of 1 mg/kg/day, culminating in a minimum dose of 2 g. Clinical response is typically apparent after 2 weeks of intravenous administration. Ketoconazole is also effective, starting at 600–800 mg/day for 3 months followed by a reduced dose of 400 mg/day for a further 6 months. The organism is also thought to be susceptible to fluconazole in vivo. A multi-month course of Amphotericin B followed by itraconazole has been suggested for complicated infection in immunodeficient individuals. Milder forms of disease may respond to monotherapy with itraconazole. To ensure clearance of the agent, maintenance therapy of itraconazole at 200–400 mg/day until CD4+ counts remain stable for several months at a minimum of 150 cells/mm^{3}. Re-emergence of disease several years after apparent clearance has been reported, and on-going surveillance is warranted for this reason. Treatment for HIV positive individuals should run in parallel to highly active antiretroviral therapy (HAART). Even though HAART has greatly improved the prognosis of HIV disease, the risk of immune reconstitution inflammatory syndrome (IRIS) is known in patients with African histoplasmosis. No evidence of acquired antifungal drug resistance has been reported in H. duboisii.

== Infections in animals ==
The baboon species Papio papio and Papio cynocephalus are known to be susceptible to infection by H. duboisii, Infections have been reported in baboons originating from West Africa after transfer to other locations. Secondary infections of the skin, subcutaneous tissues and the lymph nodes in the form of small papules and ulcerative granulomas have been reported in absence of involvement of the lungs and internal viscera. Natural infections are not known from other non-human animals that are susceptible to H. capsulatum, including cats, dogs and rodents. Animal studies have found the virulence of H. duboisii to be lower than that of H. capsulatum, which is consistent with the tendency of the former to form mainly localized cutaneous and subcutaneous infections. Experimental infections of Guinea pigs, rabbits and pigeons are known to clear spontaneously.
