= African histoplasmosis =

- Specialty: Infectious diseases

African histoplasmosis is a fungal infection caused by Histoplasma capsulatum var. duboisii, or Histoplama duboisii (Hcd). Disease has been most often reported in Uganda, Nigeria, Zaire (Democratic Republic of the Congo) and Senegal, as Hcd is exclusive to Africa. In human disease it manifests differently than histoplasmosis (caused by Histoplasma capsulatum, or Hcc), most often involving the skin and bones and rarely involving the lungs. Also unlike Hcc, Hcd has been reported to rarely present in those with HIV, likely due to underreporting. However, this along with the differences in Hcc and Hcd have been disputed.

The favored locations of African histoplasmosis are "osteoarticular, ganglionic and pulmonary". Genitourinary skin damage is rare, occurring in only 4-11% patients and typically as a secondary skin invasion in those with disseminated infection.

It presents as "localized with isolated skin, bone, or lymph node infections or disseminated with multiple cutaneous lesions present all over the body, subcutaneous abscesses, enlarged lymph nodes, liver and spleen, and visceral organ enlargement" Cutaneous manifestations can be isolated or present with nodules, papules, or ulcers. They may present with subcutaneous swelling, cold abscesses progressing to spontaneous fistulization, or ulcers that may bud. If left alone, lesions may turn into a large ulcer.

== See also ==
- Histoplasmosis
