= LPC-233 =

Chemical compound

Identifiers
- IUPAC name: 4-(4-cyclopropylbuta-1,3-diynyl)-N-[(2S,3S)-4,4-difluoro-3-hydroxy-1-(hydroxyamino)-3-methyl-1-oxobutan-2-yl]benzamide
- CAS Number: 2142075-09-8
- PubChem CID: 132060142
- PDB ligand: UFX (PDBe, RCSB PDB)

Chemical and physical data
- Formula: C_{19}H_{18}F_{2}N_{2}O_{4}
- Molar mass: 376.360 g·mol^{−1}
- 3D model (JSmol): Interactive image
- SMILES: C[C@]([C@@H](C(=O)NO)NC(=O)C1=CC=C(C=C1)C#CC#CC2CC2)(C(F)F)O
- InChI: InChI=1S/C19H18F2N2O4/c1-19(26,18(20)21)15(17(25)23-27)22-16(24)14-10-8-13(9-11-14)5-3-2-4-12-6-7-12/h8-12,15,18,26-27H,6-7H2,1H3,(H,22,24)(H,23,25)/t15-,19+/m1/s1; Key:NPTNDHDCCLLFJE-BEFAXECRSA-N

LPC-233 is an experimental antibiotic drug. It acts as a potent and selective inhibitor of the bacterial enzyme UDP-3-O-acyl-N-acetylglucosamine deacetylase (LpxC), which is important for the production of Lipid A, a key component of the cell membrane of Gram-negative bacteria. Various inhibitors of LpxC have been developed but none have yet progressed into clinical trials in humans, mostly because of off-target cardiovascular toxicity. LPC-233 is one of the most advanced drugs of this type in preclinical testing, showing activity against several pathogens of concern such as multidrug-resistant Pseudomonas aeruginosa and carbapenem resistant Enterobacter strains, and with no cardiovascular toxicity evident in testing on mice and dogs.

== See also ==
- TP0586532
