= Epizootic lymphangitis =

Fungal disease of animals

Epizootic lymphangitis is a contagious lymphangitis disease of horses and mules caused by the fungus Histoplasma farciminosum. Cattle are also susceptible, but more resistant to the disease than equids.

See also glanders and equine lymphangitis.

== Classification ==
In the United Kingdom it is a notifiable disease; the OIE no longer classifies it as a Listed Disease.

== Symptoms ==
Epizootic lymphangitis usually presents with the following symptoms:

- Skin eruption, usually on legs, occasionally head or neck, rarely other body parts.
- The lymph vessels in the skin stand out prominently, and small hard nodules approximately 1 cm (1/2 in) in diameter appear on their course.
- The nodules suppurate forming abscesses and discharge a thick yellow pus. Proud flesh grows from the wounds, the lymph vessels around being inflamed, and the eruption gradually extends.
- The neighbouring glands are swollen and hard. The ulcers heal with difficulty, even under treatment, and they may break out again after an apparent cure had been effected.

== Diagnosis ==
This disease is distinguished from glanders/farcy by the presence of the Histoplasma organisms in the pus, and failure of the mallein test to produce a reaction. Both Glanders and epizootic lymphangitis may be present in the same animal. Serology can be used to assist diagnosis.

== Control ==
Control of the disease is usually through elimination of the infection. This is achieved by culling infected horses and application of strict hygiene practices to prevent spread of the organism.

Vaccination has been used on a limited scale in areas where enzootic lymphangitis is endemic, e.g. Iraq, but is not authorised for widespread use.
