= Kristaps Helmanis =

Latvian microbiologist (1848-1892)

- Born: 3 June 1848; Tērvete, Courland Governorate, Russian Empire
- Died: 2 March 1892 (aged 43); Saint Petersburg
- Education: Dorpat Veterinary Institute
- Known for: research on tuberculin and mallein
- Scientific career
- Fields: Microbiology
- Workplaces: Institute of Experimental Medicine in St Petersburg

Kristaps Helmanis (German: Christopher Hellmann, Russian: Христофо́р Ива́нович Ге́льман; 3 June 1848 – 2 March 1892) was a Latvian vaccinologist and microbiologist. He discovered tuberculin simultaneously with Robert Koch and mallein together with Oto Kalniņš (1891).

== Biography ==
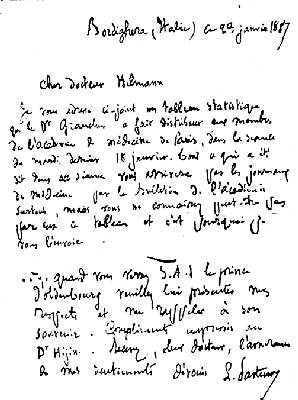
A letter from Louis Pasteur to Kristaps Helmanis (January 29, 1887)

Helmanis was born on 3 June 1848 in Tērvete (then Hofzumberge, Courland Governorate), received education at the parish school and Jelgava Real School (Jelgavas reālskola). He studied veterinary medicine at the Dorpat Veterinary Institute (Kaiserliche Veterinair-Institut zu Dorpat, 1873–1877) and received a gold medal for his work “On Development of Spermatozoids of Vertebrates”. After graduation he stayed at the institute for a degree of master of science he received in 1879.

Then Helmanis relocated to the capital of Russian Empire, St. Petersburg, where he started to work as a veterinary of the guard cavalry regiment. There he organised a laboratory by the dispensary and started to study clinical symptoms of glanders in horses and laboratory animals. When Louis Pasteur created a vaccine against rabies in 1886, Kristaps Helmanis devoted himself to the research of rabies in St. Petersburg and reported his results to the Duke Alexander Petrovich of Oldenburg, who supported his studies. Kristaps Helmanis himself paid a visit to Paris. Louis Pasteur sent two collaborators to St. Petersburg in order to create a station, and the second Pasteur station in the Russian Empire administered by Helmanis was founded. At the Pasteur station he not only vaccinated bitten patients, but also tried to create diagnostic serums for tuberculosis, syphilis, smallpox and anthrax. He obtained diagnostic test for tuberculosis and informed Louis Pasteur about his discovery. At the same time Robert Koch at the Tenth International Medical Congress held 1890 in Berlin unexpectedly introduced a cure for tuberculosis, which he called tuberculin.

In 1890 Kristaps Helmanis left the army service and joined newly founded Institute of Experimental Medicine in St. Petersburg as the head of the division of epizootology. He was successful to obtain microbial extract of glanders called mallein. Unfortunately several of Helmanis’ collaborators and colleagues Alfrēds Bertušs (1849—1890), Roberts Vāgners (1861—1890) and Oto Kalniņš (1856—1891) became infected and died from this disease.

On 10 March 1892 Helmanis married Estonian singer Emmelin Strandman, but soon after he died from a brain tumour. He was buried in Tērvete.
