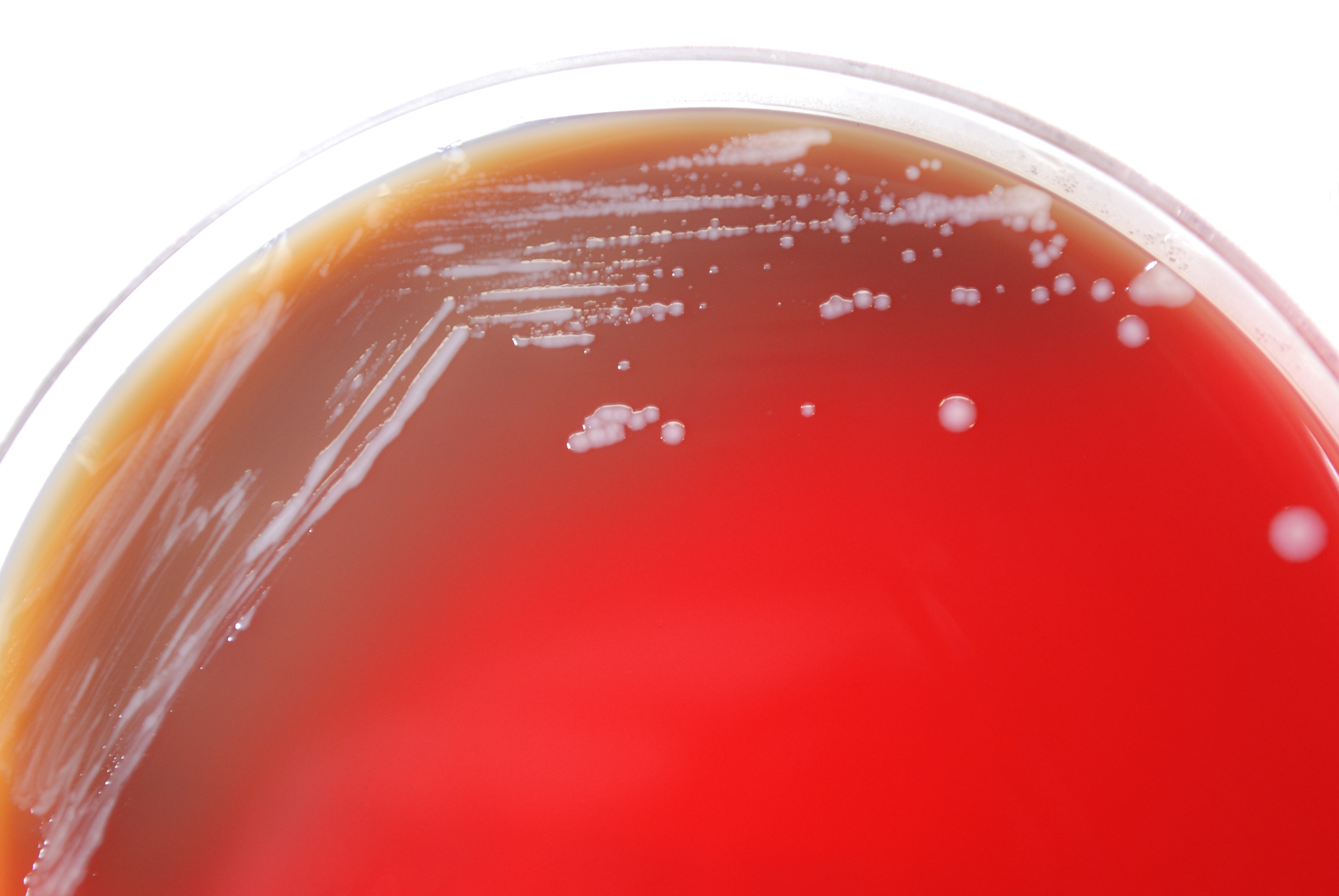

Scientific classification
- Domain: Bacteria
- Kingdom: Pseudomonadati
- Phylum: Pseudomonadota
- Class: Betaproteobacteria
- Order: Burkholderiales
- Family: Burkholderiaceae
- Genus: Burkholderia
- Species: B. mallei

Binomial name
- Burkholderia mallei (Zopf 1885); Yabuuchi et al. 1993

Synonyms
- Bacillus mallei Zopf 1885; Actinobacillus mallei (Zopf 1885) Brumpt 1910; Pfeifferella mallei (Zopf 1885) Buchanan 1918; Malleomyces mallei (Zopf 1885) Pribram 1933; Loefferella mallei (Zopf 1885) Holden 1935; Acinetobacter mallei (Zopf 1885) Steel and Cowan 1964; Pseudomonas mallei (Zopf 1885) Redfearn et al. 1966

= Burkholderia mallei =

Species of bacterium

Burkholderia mallei is a Gram-negative, bipolar or variable Gram staining,, aerobic bacterium, a human and animal pathogen of genus Burkholderia causing glanders; the Latin name of this disease (malleus) gave its name to the species causing it. It is closely related to B. pseudomallei, and by multilocus sequence typing it is a subspecies of B. pseudomallei. B. mallei evolved from B. pseudomallei by selective reduction and deletions from the B. pseudomallei genome. Unlike B. pseudomallei and other genus members, B. mallei is nonmotile; its shape is coccobacillary measuring some 1.5–3.0 μm in length and 0.5–1.0 μm in diameter with rounded ends.

== Discovery and early history ==
Wilhelm Schütz and Friedrich Löffler first isolated B. mallei in 1882. It was isolated from an infected liver and spleen of a horse. This bacterium is also one of the first to be identified containing a type VI secretion system which is important for its pathogenicity. In 1885, the German Botanist and Bacteriologist, Wilhelm Zopf (1846–1909) gave the pathogen its binomial name, after analyzing samples of the bacterium. He further refined his observations with the pathogen in 1886.

== Family Burkholderiaceae ==
Most organisms within the Burkholderiaceae live in soil; however, B. mallei does not. Because B. mallei is an obligate mammalian pathogen, it must infect a host mammal to live and to be transmitted from one host to another.

=== Genus Burkholderia ===
B. mallei is very closely related to B. pseudomallei, being 99% identical in conserved genes when compared to B. pseudomallei. B. malllei has about 1.4 Mb less DNA than B. pseudomallei. B. mallei may have actually evolved from a strain of B. pseudomallei after the latter had infected an animal. The bacterium would have lost the genes that were not necessary for living in an animal host. This suggestion has found support from studies that compare strains of B. mallei to B. pseudomallei and indicate that their two respective genomes are very similar. The genes that allowed the bacterium to survive in a soil environment, like genes that gave B. mallei the capacity to protect against bactericidals, antibiotics, and antifungals, were likely deleted. Thus, the reason that B. mallei is not found outside of a host is because it lacks the genes necessary for survival in the soil. Genome comparisons also seem to indicate that the B. mallei is still evolving and adapting to an intracellular lifestyle.

== Genome ==
The genome of B. mallei was sequenced in the United States by The Institute of Genomic Research. The size of the genome is smaller than that of B. pseudomallei. The B. mallei sequence revealed a chromosome of 3.5 mega base pairs (Mb) and a 2.3 Mb "megaplasmid". Many insertion sequences and phase-variable genes were also found. The genome for B. mallei is made up of two circular chromosomes. Chromosome 1 is where genes relating to metabolism, capsule formation, and lipopolysaccharide biosynthesis are located. B. mallei has a polysaccharide capsule which indicates its potential as a pathogen. Chromosome 2 is where most of the information regarding secretion systems and virulence-associated genes are located. Multilocus sequence typing has revealed that B. mallei most likely evolved from a B. pseudomallei clone reduction. About 1000 B. pseudomellei genes are absent or varying in the B. mallei genome. B. mallei's genome also has a large amount of insertion sequences.

== Taxonomy ==
Burkholderia mallei was first called "Bacillus mallei" and was in the genus Pseudomonas until the early 1990s. It is now part of the genus Burkholderia.

== Typing ==
No standardised system exists for differentiating between B. mallei and B. pseudomallei. The methods that have been used to differentiate and identify one strain from the other include ribotyping, pulsed-field gel electrophoresis, multilocus enzyme electrophoresis, random amplified polymorphic DNA analysis, and multilocus sequence typing. Comparing the DNA of B. mallei and B. pseudomallei must be done at the 23S rDNA level, however, since no identifiable difference is found between the two species at the 16S rDNA level.

== Growth in culture ==
Both B. mallei and B. pseudomallei can be cultured in a laboratory; nutrient agar can be used to grow the bacteria. When grown in culture, B. mallei grows in smooth, grey, translucent colonies. In a period of 18 hours at 37 °C, a B. mallei colony can grow to about 0.5–1.0 mm in diameter. B. mallei culture growth on MacConkey agar is variable. Many microbiologists are unfamiliar with B. mallei and as a result it has frequently been misidentified as a Pseudomonas species or as a contaminant in a culture.

== Antibiotic resistance and susceptibility ==
The bacterium is susceptible to numerous disinfectants including benzalkonium chloride, iodine, mercuric chloride, potassium permanganate, 1% sodium hypochlorite, and ethanol. The micro-organism can also be destroyed by heating or ultraviolet light. Antibiotics such as streptomycin, amikacin, tetracycline, doxycycline, carbapenems, ceftazidime, amoxicillin/clavulanic acid, piperacillin, chloramphenicol, and sulfathiazole have been reported to be effective against the bacteria in vitro. B. mallei, like B. pseudomallei, is also resistant to a number of antibiotics including aminoglycosides, polymyxins, and beta-lactams. No vaccine is currently available for humans or animals to protect against B. mallei infection. An animal model that will predict immune responses necessary to create immunity to the bacterium is needed before a vaccine can be developed. Mice are fairly close to humans in their susceptibility to B. mallei and would be the ideal choice of animal for creating a model for the vaccine.

== Pathogenicity ==
Burkholderia mallei is responsible for causing glanders disease, which historically mostly affected animals, such as horses, mules, and donkeys, and rarely humans. Horses are considered the natural host for B. mallei infection and are highly susceptible to it. B. mallei infects and gains access to the cell of its host through lysis of the entry vacuole. B. mallei has bacterial protein-dependent, actin-based motility once inside the cell. It is also able to initiate host cell fusion that results in multinucleated giant cells (MNGCs). The consequence of MNGCs has yet to be determined, but it may allow the bacteria to spread to different cells, evade responses by the infected host's immune system, or allow the bacteria to remain in the host longer. B. mallei is able to survive inside host cells through its capabilities in disrupting the bacteria-killing functions of the cell. It leaves the vacuoles early, which allows for efficient replication of the bacteria inside the cell. Leaving the cell early also keeps the bacteria from being destroyed by lysosomal defensins and other pathogen-killing agents. MNGCs may help protect the bacteria from immune responses. B. mallei's ability to live within the host cell makes developing a vaccine against it difficult and complex. The vaccine would need to create a cell-mediated immune response, as well as a humoral response to the bacteria in to be effective in protecting against B. mallei. In regards to a vaccine against B. mallei, the closeness of B. mallei to B. pseudomallei may make it possible that a vaccine developed for either type would be effective against the other.

=== Symptoms of Burkholderia mallei infection ===
Horses chronically infected with B. mallei with glanders disease typically experience mucus-containing nasal discharge, lung lesions, and nodules around the liver or spleen. Acute infection in horses results in a high fever, loss of fat or muscle, erosion of the surface of the nasal septum, hemorrhaging or mucus discharge. The bacterium mostly affects the lungs and airways. Human infection with B. mallei is rare, although it occasionally occurs among laboratory workers dealing with the bacteria or those who are frequently near infected animals. The bacteria usually infect a person through their eyes, nose, mouth, or cuts in the skin. Once people are infected, they develop a fever and rigors. Eventually, they get pneumonia, pustules, and abscesses, which prove fatal within a week to 10 days if left untreated by antibiotics. The way someone is infected by the bacteria also affects the type of symptoms that will result. If the bacteria enter through the skin, a local skin infection can result, while inhaling B. mallei can cause septicemic or pulmonary, muscular, hepatic, or splenous infections. B. mallei infection has a fatality rate of 95% if left untreated, and a 50% fatality rate in individuals treated with antibiotics.

=== Cellular response to infection ===
In the first days of B. mallei infection, neutrophils, macrophages, and T cells go to the spleen in great quantities. The early cellular response to B. mallei infection involves Gr-1+ (antigen) cells, and implies their importance to immunity against this bacterial infection. T cells (nitric oxide) are actually more involved in combating B. mallei in the later stages of its infection of a host.

Lipopolysaccharide isolated from B. mallei demonstrated significantly lower biological activity as compared to the LPS from Escherichia coli, in agreement with the lower degree of acylation of its lipid A: the major forms of B. mallei lipid A were penta- and tetraacylated, whereas classical lipid A from E. coli was hexaacylated. In addition, lipid A from B. mallei contains 4-amino-4-deoxyarabinose residue in almost half of the molecules, which would partially neutralize the negative charge of the phosphate groups necessary for the interaction with the positively charged amino acids of TLR4. At the same time, lipid A acyl chains in B. mallei were on the average longer (14–16 carbon atoms) than those in E. coli (14 carbon atoms), yet LPS from B. mallei appeared to be a weaker activator. B. mallei may employ LPS with low biological activity to evade proper recognition by the TLR4/MD-2 complex of innate immune system, dampening the host immune response and increasing the risk of bacterial dissemination.

== Global presence ==
Burkholderia mallei has been eradicated in the United States and most Western countries, but still affects animals in Africa, Asia, the Middle East, Central America, and South America. Many Western countries were able to eliminate the disease through glanders control programs and laws requiring notification of cases of infection to health departments and the destruction of any animal affected with B. mallei.

== Potential as a biological weapon ==
Burkholderia mallei and B. pseudomallei have a history of being on a list of potential biological warfare agents. The Centers for Disease Control and Prevention classifies B. mallei as a category B critical biological agent. As a result, research regarding B. mallei may only be done in biosafety level 3 facilities in the US and internationally. Though it is so highly infective and a potential biological weapon, little research has been conducted on this bacterium. B. mallei and B. pseudomallei under the policy of Institutional Oversight of Life Sciences Dual Use Research of Concern would be subject to oversight to ensure the responsible investigation of these agents.

== Incidence in the United States ==
In March 2000, one of the first cases since the 1940s of glanders in the United States occurred in a young microbiologist working for the U.S. Army Medical Research Institute for Infectious Diseases. The researcher had type 1 diabetes and had been working with B. mallei for about two years, but he did not always wear gloves while conducting his research. The researcher experienced enlargement of the lymph nodes and a fever which lasted for 10 days even with antibiotic treatment. In the following weeks, the researcher experienced fatigue, rigors, night sweats, and loss of weight. The next month, his symptoms seemed to disappear after treatment with clarithromycin, but after the medication was stopped, the symptoms reappeared. After conducting multiple tests on cultures from the researcher's blood and a biopsied portion of a liver abscess, the bacterium was identified as B. mallei. Once it was established what infected the researcher, another course of antibiotics was given (imipenem and doxycycline) with 6 months of treatment. After a year, the researcher made a full recovery.

This incident also showed how a cut or skin abrasion is not absolutely necessary to contract the disease, as the researcher had no recollection of any cut or accident while working in the laboratory. The case was significant as it showed the difficulty that microbiology laboratories have in identifying bioweapon agents and the potential consequences if measures are not taken to prepare for an actual biological attack.

== History as a weapon of biological warfare ==
Burkholderia mallei was intentionally used to infect animals and humans during World War I. The Germans used B. mallei to infect animals that were being sent from neutral countries to the Allies with glanders. The Germans' plans for biological warfare started in 1915 on the East Coast of the United States; they intended to infect and kill the livestock that were being sent to the Allies and facilitate the transfer of the disease to humans. The East Coast was where many animals were being assembled for shipment to the Allies fighting in Europe. The Germans also targeted Romania, Norway, and Spain's animal supplies with cultures of glanders. The German biological sabotage eventually spread to Argentina, where agents would rely on bacterial cultures from Spain to infect the cattle, horses, and mules that Argentina was supplying to the Allies. The German use of microbes as weapons is one of the only documented attacks of intentionally using biological weapons against neutral countries.

The Japanese used B. mallei in their biological warfare research units. The most notable and notorious unit, Unit 731, used the bacterium to conduct experiments on live human subjects. However, the Japanese did not end up creating a biological weapon out of B. mallei. They did actually use B. mallei to test its effectiveness in contaminating water supplies, and the results of these tests were successful.

The Russians' biological weapons program also took an interest in B. mallei and conducted field tests with it. Some of the researchers from the program were actually infected and killed by it during the course of their research. It has been suggested that the Soviet Union eventually used B. mallei during their war in Afghanistan against the mujahideen.

== See also ==
- Mallein test
- Glanders
