= TP0586532 =

Chemical compound

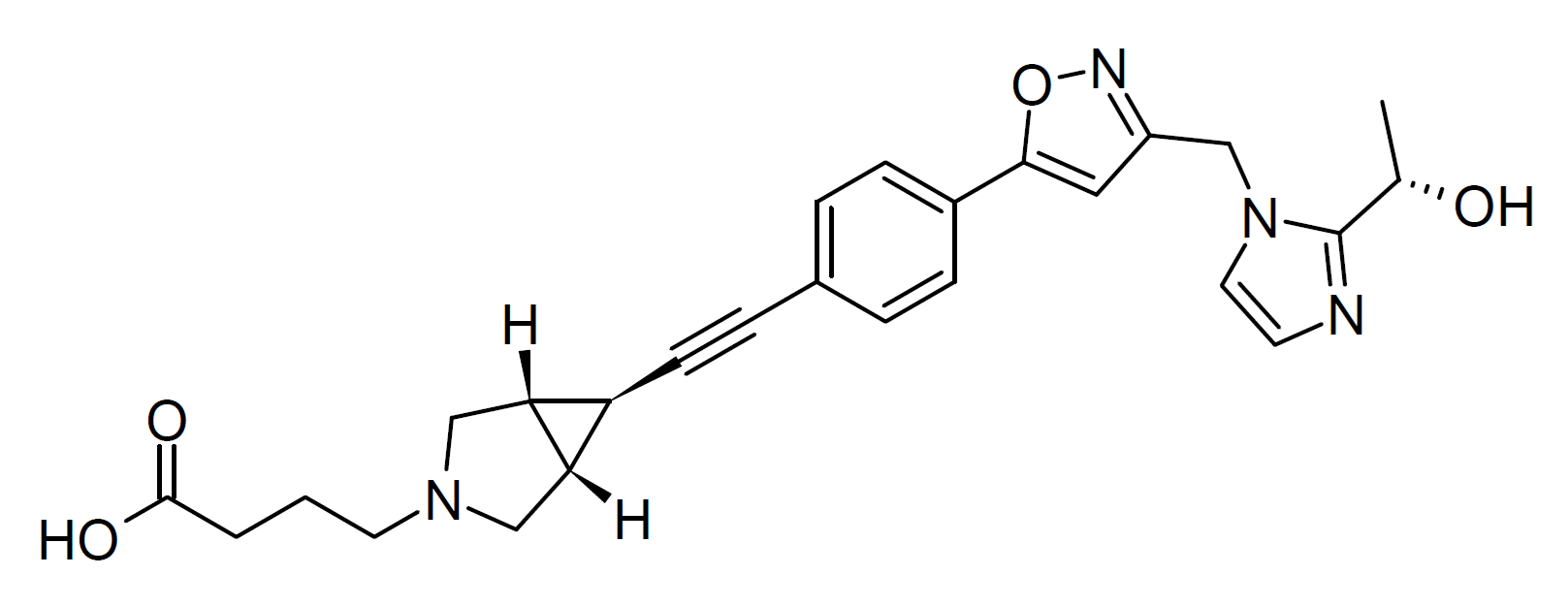

Legal status
- Legal status: Investigational

Identifiers
- IUPAC name: 4-[(1R,5S)-6-[2-[4-[3-[[2-[(1S)-1-hydroxyethyl]imidazol-1-yl]methyl]-1,2-oxazol-5-yl]phenyl]ethynyl]-3-azabicyclo[3.1.0]hexan-3-yl]butanoic acid
- CAS Number: 2427584-96-9
- PubChem CID: 155294517
- ChemSpider: 115009295
- ChEMBL: ChEMBL4798122
- PDB ligand: H4R (PDBe, RCSB PDB)

Chemical and physical data
- Formula: C_{26}H_{28}N_{4}O_{4}
- Molar mass: 460.534 g·mol^{−1}
- 3D model (JSmol): Interactive image
- SMILES: C[C@@H](C1=NC=CN1CC2=NOC(=C2)C3=CC=C(C=C3)C#CC4[C@H]5[C@@H]4CN(C5)CCCC(=O)O)O
- InChI: InChI=1S/C26H28N4O4/c1-17(31)26-27-10-12-30(26)14-20-13-24(34-28-20)19-7-4-18(5-8-19)6-9-21-22-15-29(16-23(21)22)11-2-3-25(32)33/h4-5,7-8,10,12-13,17,21-23,31H,2-3,11,14-16H2,1H3,(H,32,33)/t17-,21?,22-,23+/m0/s1; Key:PULUMLQUYYSBOR-BOSCWZPRSA-N

TP0586532 is an experimental antibiotic drug, which acts as a potent and selective inhibitor of the bacterial enzyme UDP-3-O-acyl-N-acetylglucosamine deacetylase (LpxC). This enzyme is important for the production of Lipid A, a key component of the cell membrane of Gram-negative bacteria. Previous inhibitors of LpxC have failed to progress into clinical trials in humans, mostly because of off-target cardiovascular toxicity, so TP0586532 was based on a different structural class which is hoped to reduce this risk. In animal studies it shows activity against carbapenem-resistant Klebsiella pneumoniae but has not yet progressed into human trials.

== See also ==
- LPC-233
