= Raetz =

Raetz is a surname. Notable people with the surname include:

- Christian R. H. Raetz (1946-2011), George Barth Geller Professor of Biochemistry at Duke University
- Dennis Raetz (born 1946), American football player, coach and scout
- Markus Raetz (1941-2020), Swiss painter, illustrator and sculptor
