= Léopold Nègre =

French physician (1879–1961)

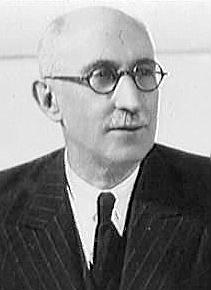
- French physician and biologist Léopold Nègre
- Born: June 15, 1879; Montpellier
- Died: July 29, 1961 (aged 82); 15th arrondissement of Paris
- Resting place: Nocé
- Citizenship: French
- Education: Pasteur Institute
- Occupations: physician & Biologist
- Spouse: Suzanne Charon
- Children: André, Pierre, Yvonne & Étienne

Léopold Nègre (15 June 1879 – 29 July 1961) was a French physician and biologist born in Montpellier.

He studied natural sciences at the University of Montpellier, followed by courses in microbiology at the Pasteur Institute in Paris. From 1907 to 1910, he served as préparateur at the laboratory of microbiology courses headed by Amédée Borrel (1867–1936). In 1910, he obtained his doctorate of medicine. Following an internship at the Pasteur Institute in Lille, he was appointed laboratory chief (microbial analysis) at the Pasteur Institute in Algiers. In 1918 he received his doctorate of natural sciences.

In 1919, he was assigned to the laboratory of tuberculosis headed by Albert Calmette (1863–1933) at the Pasteur Institute in Paris. Here he took part in research of Bacillus Calmette-Guérin (BCG vaccine). With microbiologist Alfred Boquet (1879–1947) he developed antigene méthylique (methyl antigen) for treatment of tuberculosis.

In 1931, Nègre became chair at the Institut Pasteur, and in 1944 was named vice president of the Société de biologie. He was also president of the Société française de la tuberculose (1950) and a member of the Académie de Médecine (hygiene section, from 1951).

== Selected writings ==
- Infections à bacille pseudo-dysentériques en Algérie (Infections by pseudo-dysenteric bacillus in Algeria) 1916
- Bacilles paradysentériques isolés en Algérie (Paradysenteric bacilli isolated in Algeria) 1917
- Résultats des vaccinations triples antityphoïdiques et antiparatyphoïdiques dans les troupes d'Alger (Results of typhoid and paratyphoid vaccinations of troops in Algiers) 1917
- Lymphangite epizootique des solipèdes : contribution a l'ètude des mycoses (Epizootic lymphangitis of solipeds: contribution to the study of fungi) with Alfred Boquet; 1920
- Antigénothérapie de la tuberculose par les extraits méthyliques de bacilles de Koch (Antigen therapy of tuberculosis by extracts of tubercle bacilli methyl) with Alfred Boquet; 1927
- Le traitement de la tuberculose par l'antigène méthylique (antigénothérapie) (Treatment of tuberculosis by antigen-methyl (antigen therapy) with Alfred Boquet; 1932
- Albert Calmette, sa vie, son oeuvre scientifique (Albert Calmette, his life, his scientific work) 1939
- Vaccination par le BCG par scarifications cutanées (BCG vaccination by skin scarification) with J. Breley; 1942
- Prévention et traitement spécifiques de la tuberculose par le BCG et par l'antigène méthylique (Prevention and treatment of specific tuberculosis with BCG and antigen methyl) 1956
