= Primary pulmonary histoplasmosis =

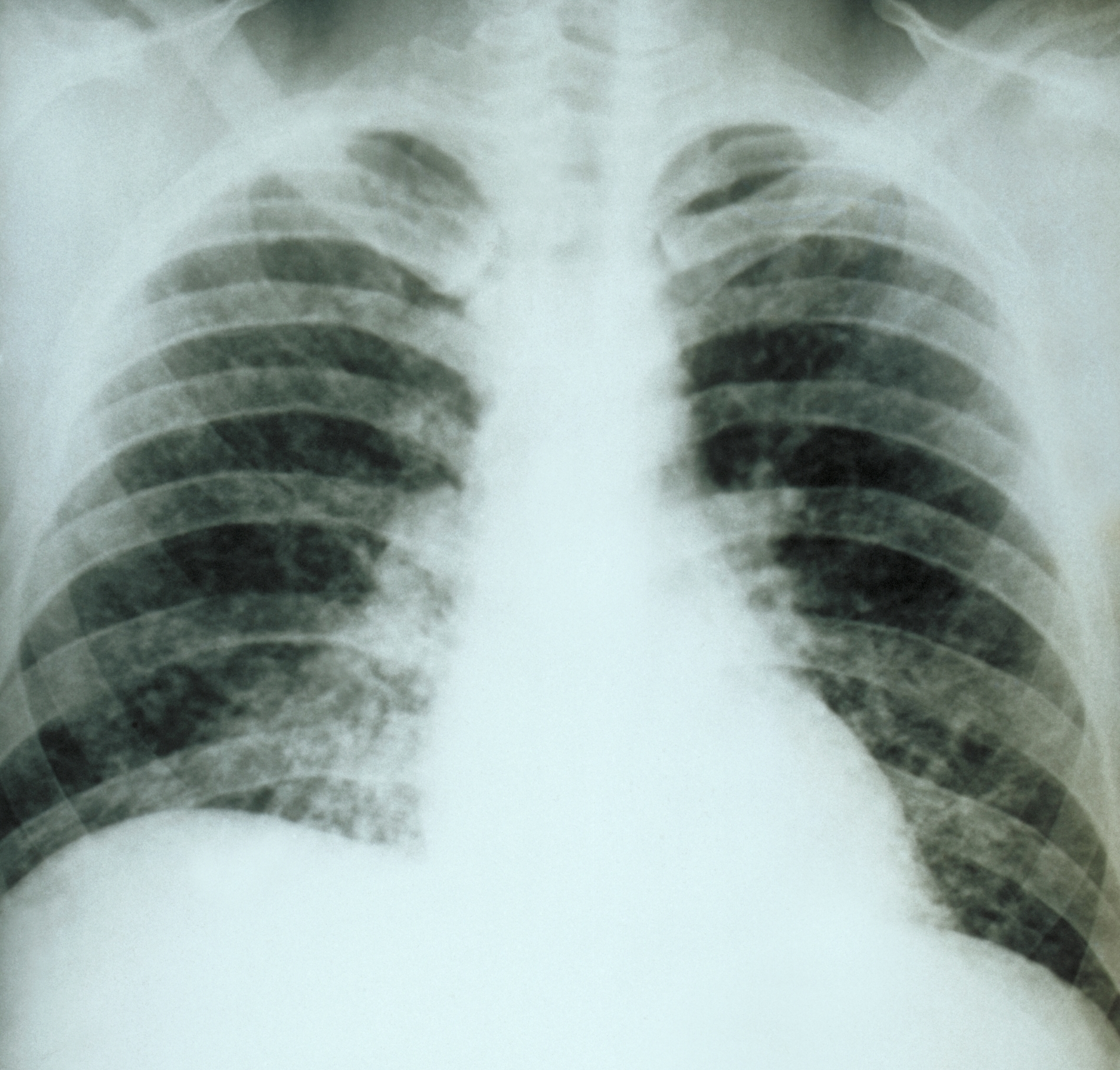
- This chest film shows diffuse pulmonary infiltration due to acute pulmonary histoplasmosis caused by H. capsulatum.
- Specialty: Infectious disease

Primary pulmonary histoplasmosis is caused by inhalation of Histoplasma capsulatum spores, and approximately 10% of people with this acute infection develop erythema nodosum.

== See also ==
- Histoplasmosis
