= UDP-3-O-acyl-N-acetylglucosamine deacetylase =

Type of enzyme

Identifiers
- EC no.: 3.5.1.108

Databases
- IntEnz: IntEnz view
- BRENDA: BRENDA entry
- ExPASy: NiceZyme view
- KEGG: KEGG entry
- MetaCyc: metabolic pathway
- PRIAM: profile
- PDB structures: RCSB PDB PDBe PDBsum
Search
- PMC: articles
- PubMed: articles
- NCBI: proteins

UDP-3-O-acyl-N-acetylglucosamine deacetylase (EC 3.5.1.108), also known as LpxC, is a zinc-dependent enzyme involved in bacterial lipid A biosynthesis, catalyzing the removal of the acetyl group from UDP-3-O-acyl-N-acetylglucosamine, a key step in the production of lipopolysaccharides in the outer membrane of gram-negative bacteria.

This enzyme catalyses the chemical reaction:

UDP-3-O-[(3R)-3-hydroxymyristoyl]-N-acetylglucosamine + H_{2}O $\rightleftharpoons$ UDP-3-O-[(3R)-3-hydroxymyristoyl]-D-glucosamine + acetate

== Nomenclature ==
UDP-3-O-acyl-N-acetylglucosamine deacetylase is also known as:

- UDP-3-O-((3R)-3-hydroxymyristoyl)-N-acetylglucosamine amidohydrolase
- LpxC enzyme
- LpxC deacetylase
- deacetylase LpxC
- UDP-3-O-acyl-GlcNAc deacetylase
- UDP-3-O-((R)-3-hydroxymyristoyl)-N-acetylglucosamine deacetylase
- UDP-(3-O-acyl)-N-acetylglucosamine deacetylase
- UDP-3-O-(R-3-hydroxymyristoyl)-N-acetylglucosamine deacetylase
- UDP-(3-O-(R-3-hydroxymyristoyl))-N-acetylglucosamine deacetylase)

== Inhibitors ==
Various inhibitors of LpxC have been developed as potential antibiotics, though none have yet reached clinical trials.

- ACHN-975
- CHIR-090
- CS250
- LPC-233
- PF-5081090
- TP0586532
