= Tetraacyldisaccharide 4'-kinase =

LpxK

Identifiers
- Symbol: LpxK
- Pfam: PF02606
- Pfam clan: CL0023
- InterPro: IPR003758
- OPM superfamily: 124
- OPM protein: 4ehx
Available protein structures:
- Pfam: structures / ECOD
- PDB: RCSB PDB; PDBe; PDBj
- PDBsum: structure summary

tetraacyldisaccharide 4'-kinase

Identifiers
- EC no.: 2.7.1.130
- CAS no.: 107309-06-8

Databases
- IntEnz: IntEnz view
- BRENDA: BRENDA entry
- ExPASy: NiceZyme view
- KEGG: KEGG entry
- MetaCyc: metabolic pathway
- PRIAM: profile
- PDB structures: RCSB PDB PDBe PDBsum
- Gene Ontology: AmiGO / QuickGO
Search
- PMC: articles
- PubMed: articles
- NCBI: proteins

Tetraacyldisaccharide 4'-kinase is an enzyme that phosphorylates the 4'-position of a tetraacyldisaccharide 1-phosphate precursor (DS-1-P) of lipopolysaccharide lipid A. This lipid forms outer membranes of Gram-negative bacteria. This enzyme catalyzes the chemical reaction

ATP + [2-N,3-O-bis(3-hydroxytetradecanoyl)-beta-D-glucosaminyl]-(1->6)-[2- N,3-O-bis(3-hydroxytetradecanoyl)-beta-D-glucosaminyl phosphate] $\rightleftharpoons$ ADP + [2-N,3-O-bis(3-hydroxytetradecanoyl)-4-O-phosphono-beta-D- glucosaminyl]-(1->6)-[2-N,3-O-bis(3-hydroxytetradecanoyl)-beta-D- glucosaminyl phosphate]

This enzyme belongs to the family of transferases, specifically those transferring phosphorus-containing groups (phosphotransferases) with an alcohol group as acceptor.
