= Equine lymphangitis =

Horse disease

Equine lymphangitis is an inflammation or swelling associated with impairment of the lymphatic system, particularly in a limb, in horses. It is most commonly a bacterial infection, although bacterial culture may be negative.

Often referred to as fat- or big-leg disease, it is sometimes known as weed or Monday-morning disease (not to be confused with the more common usage of MMD referring to exertional rhabdomyolysis or azoturia). This article refers mainly to sporadic lymphangitis. Ulcerative lymphangitis is referred to in passing, as it is managed in a similar manner. Epizootic lymphangitis is similar to glanders, but caused by the fungus Histoplasma farciminosum.

== Causes ==
Corynebacterium pseudotuberculosis has been cultured from some cases (particularly of ulcerative lymphangitis, but in others, a bacterial culture is negative. This may be because:

- a) The micro-organism responsible is difficult to culture (e.g. many Mycoplasma species).
- b) The organism has been effectively eliminated by the immune system and the pathology is due to an excessive immune response after the organism has been cleared.
- c) The organism is not a bacterium, but a fungus, so is very difficult to culture.
- d) The disease has another cause.

Of these, the first is thought to be the most likely, and the last is least likely.

== Clinical signs ==
Extreme swelling of a limb, usually a hind limb, is seen, often as far proximally as the hock, or occasionally as far proximally as the stifle. In some cases, swelling continues through the udder or sheath and along the subcutaneous abdominal veins. In the early stages, the swelling is primarily a "pitting oedema"; in other words, if pressed, a depression remains in the skin of the limb. The affected leg may reach twice or even three times its normal size, and may be very sensitive to the touch. In chronic cases, much of the swelling is firm, as scarring and fibrosis occur.

Lymphangitis is commonly associated with a wound, which may be very minor. This is a likely entrance for bacterial access to the lymph ducts. The degree of lameness is variable, but may be sufficient to give the impression of a fracture. The horse may or may not be pyrexic (fevered). The limb may occasionally ooze serum.

In ulcerative lymphangitis, "cording" of the lymphatics and the formation of hard nodules and abscesses may also occur; occasionally, a greenish, malodorous discharge is present. In the US in particular, the disease may be characterised by multiple small, open sores.

== Diagnostics ==
Radiography and ultrasonography are often used to rule out the differential diagnoses of a fracture or tendinitis. Ultrasonography can also help to define boundaries of abscess pockets. Aspiration of a fluid sample for microbial culture is worth trying, but is often unrewarding.

== Treatment ==
The mainstays of treatment are the administration of broad-spectrum antibiotics (typically potentiated sulfonamides or penicillin and streptomycin, but doxycycline may be the most effective). If possible, microbial culture and sensitivity testing should be performed, so the most efficacious antibiotic can be chosen. However, intracellular organisms such as Corynebacterium pseudotuberculosis will be susceptible to certain antibiotics in vitro that are not effective for the specific organism in the horse. These horses are typically treated with rifampin in addition to one of the previously mentioned antibiotics. In addition, anti-inflammatories are important, to reduce the swelling and pain of the inflammatory response. NSAIDs are commonly used (flunixin is the drug of choice, but phenylbutazone may also be used). Corticosteroids are sometimes used in severe cases, but should be used with caution due to their potential to weaken the immune response to infection, and the possibility of inducing laminitis.

In ulcerative lymphangitis, intravenous iodine salts may also be used, and abscesses should be poulticed or lanced. Ideally, an abscess should only be lanced after it has matured well and has an obvious soft spot, or the procedure should be guided with ultrasound to find the best site for drainage that avoids important structures.

Physical therapy is also important, particularly maintaining movement by walking out and massage to improve lymphatic drainage and reduce the oedema. Bandages may also be useful, as may cold hosing in the initial phase. A sweat bandage or poultice is often applied. An overly tight bandage should not be applied, as swelling may continue, decreasing circulation through the limb, and potentially causing a bandage-bow. After-care often is advised to include consistent turnout and exercise.

== Outcome ==
The initial pain and lameness usually respond rapidly to treatment, but the swelling may persist for many weeks. In addition, once a horse has had an episode, it appears to be predisposed to recurrence, and may suffer from "filled legs" permanently – i.e. if left in a stable and relatively immobile, poor lymphatic circulation results in a passive oedema of the previously affected limb, that dissipates on exercise. In more severe cases, the limb may never return to normal size. In these cases, permanent scarring of the lymphatics and other tissues is likely. Treatment in these cases is unrewarding, and euthanasia may be indicated if the condition causes unmanageable lameness.
