= Progressive disseminated histoplasmosis =

- Specialty: Infectious disease

Progressive disseminated histoplasmosis is an infection caused by Histoplasma capsulatum, and most people who develop this severe form of histoplasmosis are immunocompromised or taking systemic corticosteroids. Skin lesions are present in approximately 6% of patients with dissemination.

== See also ==
- Histoplasmosis
