= Eritoran =

Chemical compound

Clinical data
- Other names: E 5564
- Routes of administration: Intravenous injection
- ATC code: none

Identifiers
- IUPAC name: [(2R,3R,4R,5S,6R)-4-Decoxy-5-hydroxy-6-[[(2R,3R,4R,5S,6R)-4-[(3R)-3-methoxydecoxy]-6-(methoxymethyl)-3-[[(Z)-octadec-11-enoyl]amino]-5-phosphonatooxyoxan-2-yl]oxymethyl]-3-(3-oxotetradecanoylamino)oxan-2-yl] phosphoric acid
- CAS Number: 185955-34-4 185954-98-7 (tetrasodium salt)
- PubChem CID: 6912404
- IUPHAR/BPS: 4919
- DrugBank: DB04933
- ChemSpider: 5288721
- UNII: 551541VI0Y
- KEGG: DG01426
- ChEMBL: ChEMBL501259
- CompTox Dashboard (EPA): DTXSID60873217

Chemical and physical data
- Formula: C_{66}H_{126}N_{2}O_{19}P_{2}
- Molar mass: 1313.677 g·mol^{−1}
- 3D model (JSmol): Interactive image
- SMILES: CCCCCCCCCCCC(=O)CC(=O)NC1C(C(C(OC1OP(=O)(O)O)COC2C(C(C(C(O2)COC)OP(=O)(O)O)OCCC(CCCCCCC)OC)NC(=O)CCCCCCCCCC=CCCCCCC)O)OCCCCCCCCCC
- InChI: InChI=1S/C66H126N2O19P2/c1-7-11-15-19-22-25-26-27-28-29-30-32-34-38-42-46-57(70)67-60-64(82-49-47-54(80-6)45-41-36-18-14-10-4)62(86-88(73,74)75)56(51-79-5)85-65(60)83-52-55-61(72)63(81-48-43-39-35-24-21-17-13-9-3)59(66(84-55)87-89(76,77)78)68-58(71)50-53(69)44-40-37-33-31-23-20-16-12-8-2/h25-26,54-56,59-66,72H,7-24,27-52H2,1-6H3,(H,67,70)(H,68,71)(H2,73,74,75)(H2,76,77,78)/b26-25-/t54-,55-,56-,59-,60-,61-,62-,63-,64-,65-,66-/m1/s1; Key:BPSMYQFMCXXNPC-MFCPCZTFSA-N

Eritoran is a synthetic lipid that inhibits the receptor TLR4. It was developed as a potential treatment for severe sepsis, an excessive inflammatory response to an infection. It failed a five year Phase III clinical trial, the results of which were published in 2013, and as of 2014 was no longer being developed.

It was being developed by the Japanese pharmaceutical company Eisai Co. and was administered intravenously as the sodium salt eritoran tetrasodium.

TLR4 is part of the innate immune system and plays an important role in triggering defense against pathogens. Eritoran is similar in structure to the lipopolysaccharide lipid A - a part of bacteria that binds to TLR4 and activates TLR4, triggering a defense. Eritoran binds to TLR4 but blocks its activation.

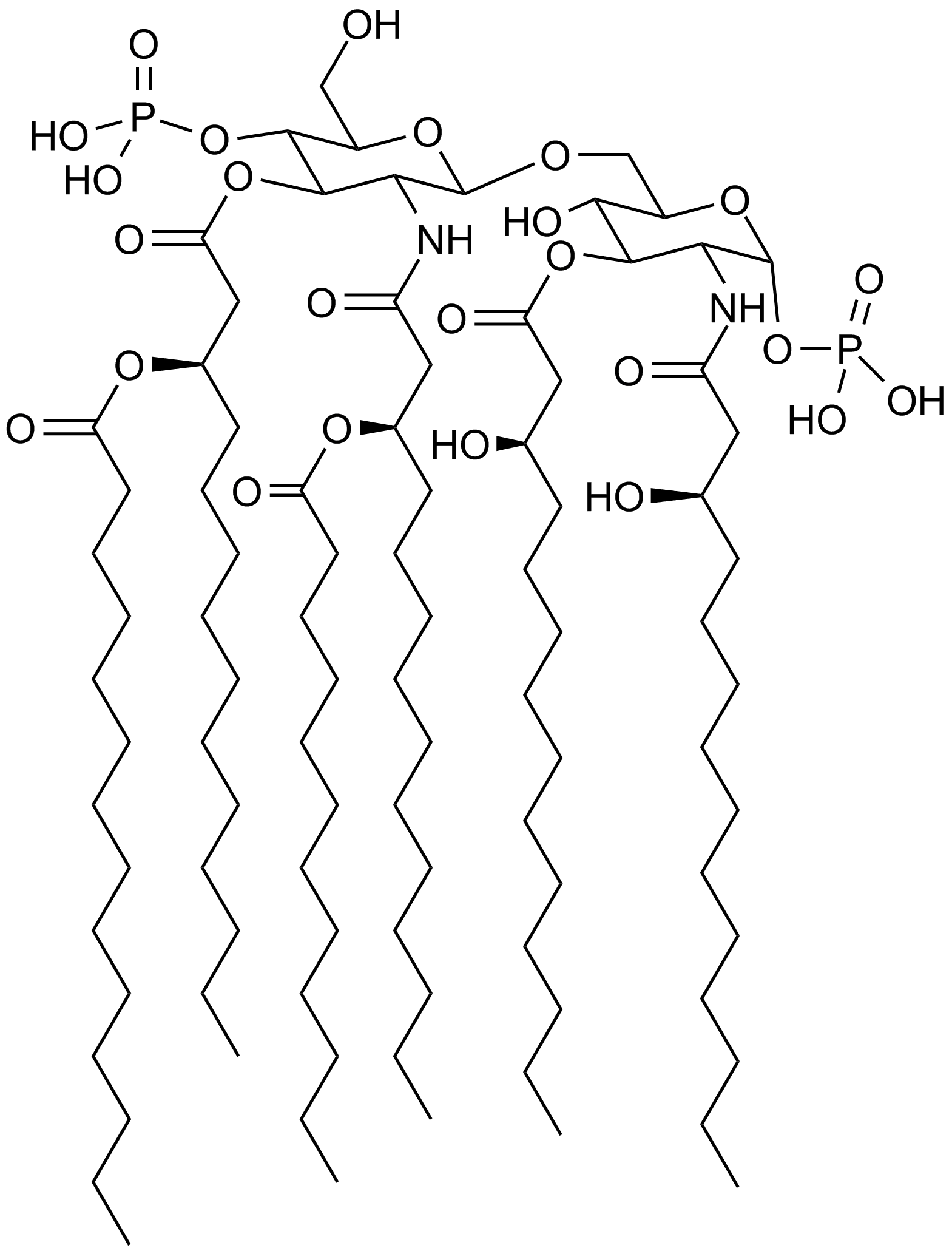
Lipid A as found in E. coli, a gram-negative bacterium

Eritoran

Too much signalling by TLR4 may be part of what causes cytokine storms and sepsis, but as of 2021 no drug that inhibits TLR4 has been shown to prevent or treat sepsis or cytokine storms in humans.
