= Lipid A deacylase =

Lipid A 3-O-deacylase (PagL)
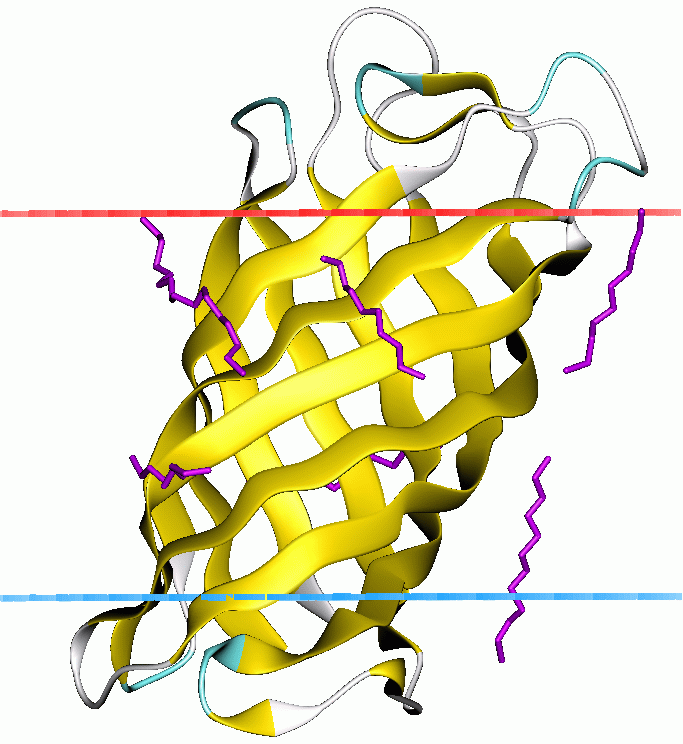

Identifiers
- Symbol: PagL
- Pfam: PF09411
- SCOP2: 2erv / SCOPe / SUPFAM
- OPM superfamily: 238
- OPM protein: 2erv
Available protein structures:
- PDB: PF09411 (ECOD; PDBsum)
- AlphaFold: PF09411

Lipid A deacylase (PagL) is an outer membrane protein with lipid A 3-O-deacylase activity. It forms an 8 stranded beta barrel structure.
