= Mallein test =

Test for glanders in veterinary medicine

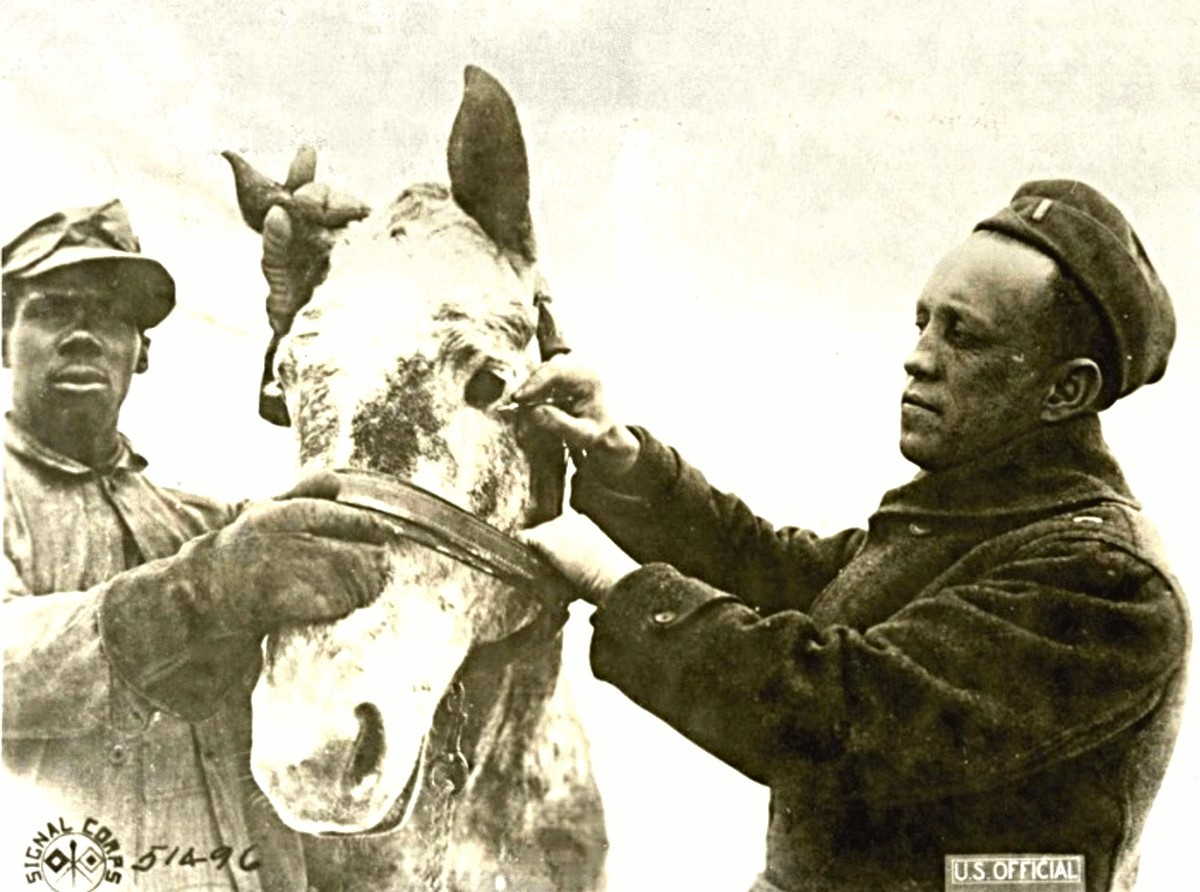
Mallein test being performed in 1918

The mallein test is a sensitive and specific clinical test for glanders, a common bacterial disease of equids (horses, donkeys, mules). This test is a type 4 delayed hypersensitivity test used as a diagnosis for glanders. It is caused by a bacterium called Burkholderia mallei, which is contagious for humans and other species. The occurrence of glanders must be reported to the World Organisation for Animal Health. Mallein, a protein fraction of B. mallei, is usually injected by an eye-drop. If an animal is infected, the animal will show swelling in the eye from around 48 hours of injection and may be accompanied by secretion and conjunctivitis. Mallein is non toxic to normal animals.

== History ==
Mallein was discovered in 1890 by Kristaps Helmanis and Oto Kalninš. Before 1934, glanders was widespread. In the early 1900s, glanders was common in Europe, the United States of America, and Canada, and has been successfully eliminated by mass testing and the slaughter and destruction of campaigns. Glanders is still present in Asia, the Middle East and South America.

== Limitations and benefits ==
=== Limitations ===
Although Mallein is the most commonly used form of testing for glanders, cross reactions were reported between Burkholderia mallei and Streptococcus equi, which is a bacteria-caused contagious upper respiratory tract infection of equines. This resulted in false-positive reactions.

=== Benefits ===
The specificity of Mallein tests and the efficiency and potency of it are connected to the "molecular weight of protein fractions, antigenic range, and virulence".

== Test procedures and methods ==
- Preparation of crude mallein
- Purification of malleo proteins
- Trichloroacetic acid (TCA) preparation
- Ammonium sulfate precipitation
- Gel filtration chromatography
- Sensitization of animals
- Potency test
- Intradermopalpebral

== See also ==
- Burkholderia mallei
- Glanders
