= Christian R. H. Raetz =

American biochemist (1946–2011)

Christian Rudolf Hubert Raetz
- Born: 1946; East Berlin
- Died: August 16, 2011 (aged 64–65)
- Education: Yale University, BS Harvard University, MD, PhD
- Known for: Lipid A biosynthesis in E. coli
- Awards: Van Deenen Medal
- Scientific career
- Fields: Biochemistry
- Workplaces: Duke University

Christian Rudolf Hubert Raetz (1946 – August 16, 2011) was the George Barth Geller Professor of Biochemistry at Duke University. He was elected to the National Academy of Sciences in 2006. His laboratory's research focused on lipid biochemistry and has contributed significantly to the understanding of Lipid A biosynthesis.

== Life and education ==
Raetz was born in 1946 in East Berlin. His parents were industrial chemists. In the early 1950s, the Olin Mathieson Chemical Corporation recruited his father. In 1951, Raetz and his parents immigrated to the United states, and his family later moved to Columbus, Ohio. Raetz earned his undergraduate degree from Yale University in 1967 and his M.D. and Ph.D. degrees from Harvard University in 1973. Raetz died of anaplastic thyroid cancer on August 16, 2011.

== Career ==
After graduate and medical school, Raetz was a research associate at the National Institute of General Medical Sciences in Bethesda, Maryland. In 1974 he secured a faculty position in the biochemistry department at the University of Wisconsin-Madison. In 1987, Raetz joined the pharmaceutical company Merck, eventually becoming vice president for biochemistry and microbiology research. In 1993, Raetz joined the biochemistry department at Duke.

== Awards and distinctions ==
- 2006 - Elected to the National Academy of Sciences
- 2006 - Van Deenen Medal
