= Subcutaneous abscess =

A subcutaneous abscess is an abscess located in the subcutaneous tissue (also hypodermis). The abscess is formed due to a hypodermal infection by a bacterium, a fungus or a parasite. Typically, this kind of abscess needs drainage, usually for a minimum of 24 hours, by means of gauze packing or a Penrose drain.

== Types ==
- Neutrophilic abscess
- Nosinophilic abscess
  - Eosinophilic granulomatous abscess
