= Cold abscess =

Abscess lacking signs of inflammation

Cold abscess refers to an abscess that lacks the intense inflammation usually associated with infection. This may be associated with infections due to bacteria like Mycobacterium tuberculosis, the cause of tuberculosis, and fungi like those from the genus Blastomyces, which cause blastomycosis, that do not tend to stimulate acute inflammation. Alternatively, cold abscesses are typical in persons with hyperimmunoglobulin E syndrome, even when infected with an organism like Staphylococcus aureus that causes abscesses with inflammation in others.

Signs of acute inflammation are absent, so the abscess is not hot and red as in a typical abscess filled with pus. Cold abscesses are generally painless cysts that may be subcutaneous, ocular, or in deep tissue such as the spine.

== See also ==
- Tuberculous cervical lymphadenitis
