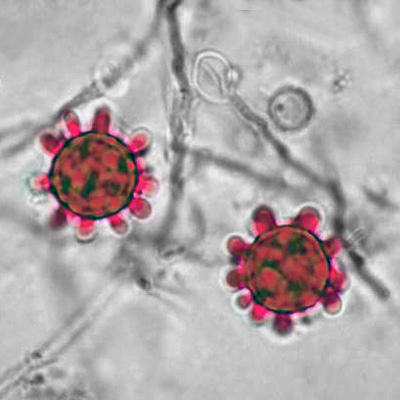
- Tuberculate macroconidia of Histoplasma capsulatum

Scientific classification
- Kingdom: Fungi
- Division: Ascomycota
- Class: Eurotiomycetes
- Order: Onygenales
- Family: Ajellomycetaceae
- Genus: Histoplasma; Darling (1906)

Type species
- Histoplasma capsulatum Darling (1906)

Species
- Histoplasma capsulatum Histoplasma duboisii Histoplasma mississippiense (nom. inval.); Histoplasma ohiense (nom. inval.); Histoplasma suramericanum (nom. inval.)

= Histoplasma =

Genus of fungi

Histoplasma is a genus of fungi in the order Onygenales. Species are known human pathogens producing yeast-like states under pathogenic conditions. They are the causative agents of histoplasmosis in humans and epizootic lymphangitis in horses.

== Forms and stages ==
Histoplasma species have two forms: their environmental form is hyphal with microconidia and tuberculate macroconidia while their pathogenic form is a small intracellular yeast that exhibits narrow-necked budding and no capsule. Infection occurs through inhalation of microconidia or small mycelial fragments. The dimorphic mold-yeast transforms and enters host macrophages and proliferates within them. Infections are most often seen in immunodeficient individuals.

Species are mainly found in the Ohio and Mississippi River Valleys in the United States (H.ohiense and H. mississippiense) as well as Central (H. capsulatum) and South America (H. suramericanum), Africa (H. duboisii), Asia, and Australia.
