= Glanders =

Horse disease that can be transmitted to humans

Glanders Disease
- Other names: Equinia, farcy, malleus
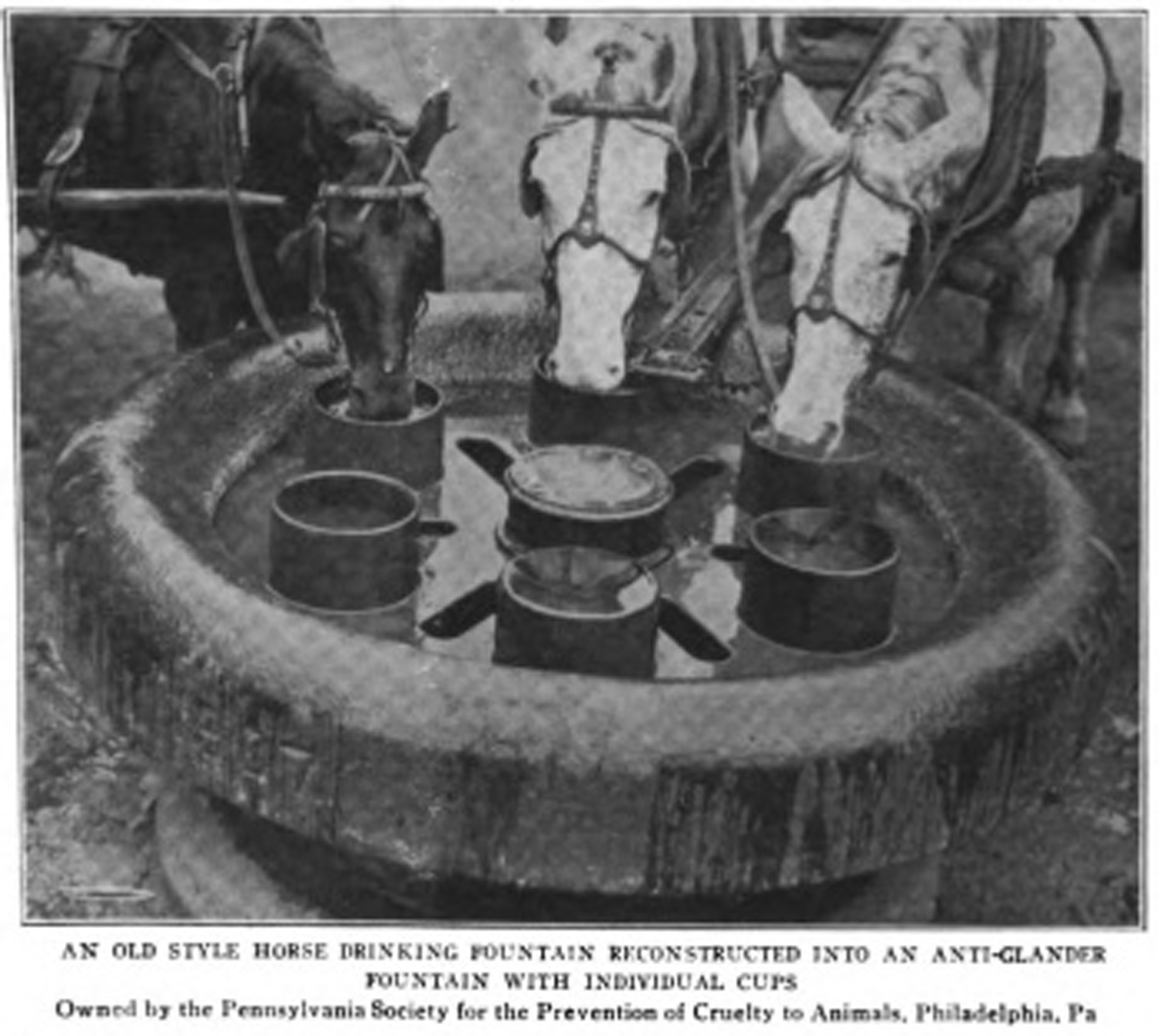
- The design of the water trough inhibits the dissemination of glanders disease among the watering horses, Philadelphia, Penn., U.S., 1917.
- Specialty: Infectious diseases, veterinary medicine

Glanders is a contagious, zoonotic infectious disease caused by the bacterium Burkholderia mallei, which primarily occurs in horses, mules, and donkeys, but can also be contracted by dogs and cats, pigs, goats, and humans. The term glanders derives from the Middle English word glaundres and from the Old French word glandres, which both denote glands. Other terms for the glanders disease are the Latin: malleus, the Spanish: muermo, the German: Rotz, and the Norwegian: snive.

Glanders is endemic in Africa, Asia, the Middle East, and Central and South America. Elsewhere, glanders has been eradicated in North America, Australia, and most of Europe, by way of the zoological observation and destruction of infected and sick animals and quarantine restrictions upon the importation of said animals. Occurrences of glanders had not been reported in the U.S. since 1945, until a laboratory accident in 2000, wherein a laboratory researcher was accidentally exposed to Burkholderia mallei bacteria. In the U.K., glanders is a notifiable disease, and there have been no occurrences reported since 1928.

== Presentation ==
Signs of glanders include the formation of nodular lesions in the lungs and ulceration of the mucous membranes in the upper respiratory tract. The acute form of glanders results in coughing, fever, and the release of an infectious nasal discharge, followed by septicaemia and death within days. In the chronic form of glanders, nasal and subcutaneous nodules develop, eventually ulcerating; death can occur within months, while survivors act as carriers.

== Cause and transmission ==
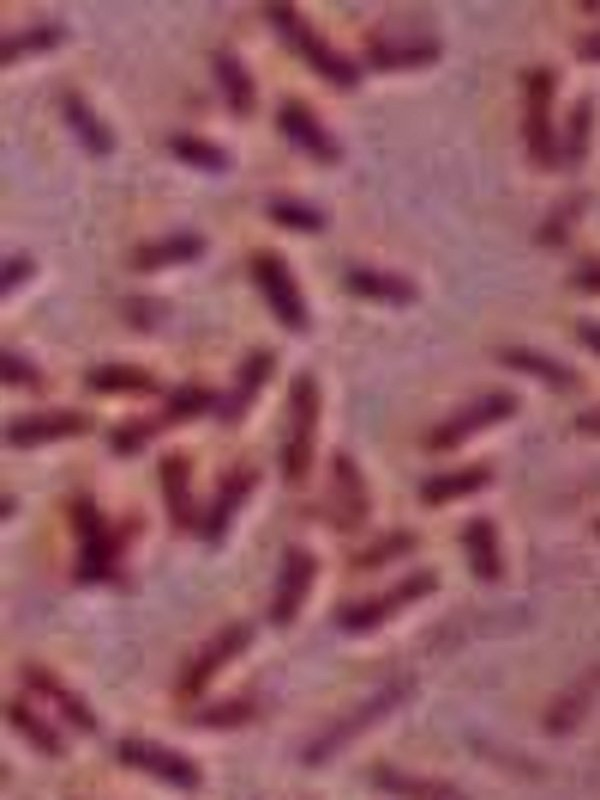
Glanders disease is caused by the Burkholderia mallei bacterium.

Glanders is caused by infection with the Burkholderia mallei bacterium, usually by way of the ingestion of contaminated animal feed and drinking water; because glanders is infectious to human beings, the B. mallei bacterium is classed as a zoonotic agent. The transmission of glanders occurs by direct contact with the infected animal's body fluids and tissues, the B. mallei pathogen enters the human body through skin abrasions, through the nasal and the oral mucosal surfaces, and by inhalation.

== Diagnosis ==
The mallein test is a sensitive and specific clinical test for glanders. Mallein (ATCvet code: QI05AR01 (WHO)), a protein fraction of the glanders organism (B. mallei), is injected intradermopalpebrally or given by eye drop. In infected animals, the eyelid swells markedly in 1 to 2 days.

== Historical cases and potential use in war ==
Glanders has been known since antiquity, with a description by Hippocrates around 425 BCE.

From the Middle Ages to the 1900s, glanders was a significant threat to armies. Before the Battle of Blenheim in 1704, glanders may have afflicted and greatly diminished the horses of Marshal Tallard's cavalry, helping the Duke of Marlborough win the battle.

Glanders was a significant problem for civilian use of horses, as well. In the 18th-century veterinary hospital at the École Nationale Vétérinaire d'Alfort, glanders was the most common disease among their equine patients and the one most likely to cause death.

Due to the high mortality rate in humans and the small number of organisms required to establish infection, B. mallei is regarded as a potential biological warfare or bioterrorism agent, as is the closely related organism, B. pseudomallei, the causative agent of melioidosis. During World War I, glanders was believed to have been spread deliberately by German agents to infect large numbers of Russian horses and mules on the Eastern Front. Other agents attempted to introduce the disease in the United States and Argentina. This had an effect on troop and supply convoys, as well as on artillery movement, which were dependent on horses and mules. Human cases in Russia increased with the infections during and after WWI. The Japanese deliberately infected horses, civilians, and prisoners of war with B. mallei at the Unit 731 Pingfang (China) Institute and Unit 100 facilities during World War II. The U.S. studied this agent as a possible biological weapon in 1943–44, but did not weaponize it. U.S. interest in glanders (agent LA) continued through the 1950s, except it had an inexplicable tendency to lose virulence in the lab, making it difficult to weaponize. Between 1982 and 1984, the Soviet Union allegedly used weaponized B. mallei during the Soviet–Afghan War.

== Vaccine research ==
No vaccine is licensed for use in the U.S. Infection with these bacteria results in nonspecific symptoms and can be either acute or chronic, impeding rapid diagnosis. The lack of a vaccine for either bacterium also makes them potential candidates for bioweaponization. Together, with their high rate of infectivity by aerosols and resistance to many common antibiotics, both bacteria have been classified as category B priority pathogens by the US NIH and US CDC, which has spurred a dramatic increase in interest in these microorganisms. Attempts have been made to develop vaccines for these infections, which would not only benefit military personnel, a group most likely to be targeted in an intentional release, but also individuals who may come in contact with glanders-infected animals or live in areas where melioidosis is endemic.
