= Subcutaneous tissue =

Lowermost layer of the integumentary system in vertebrates

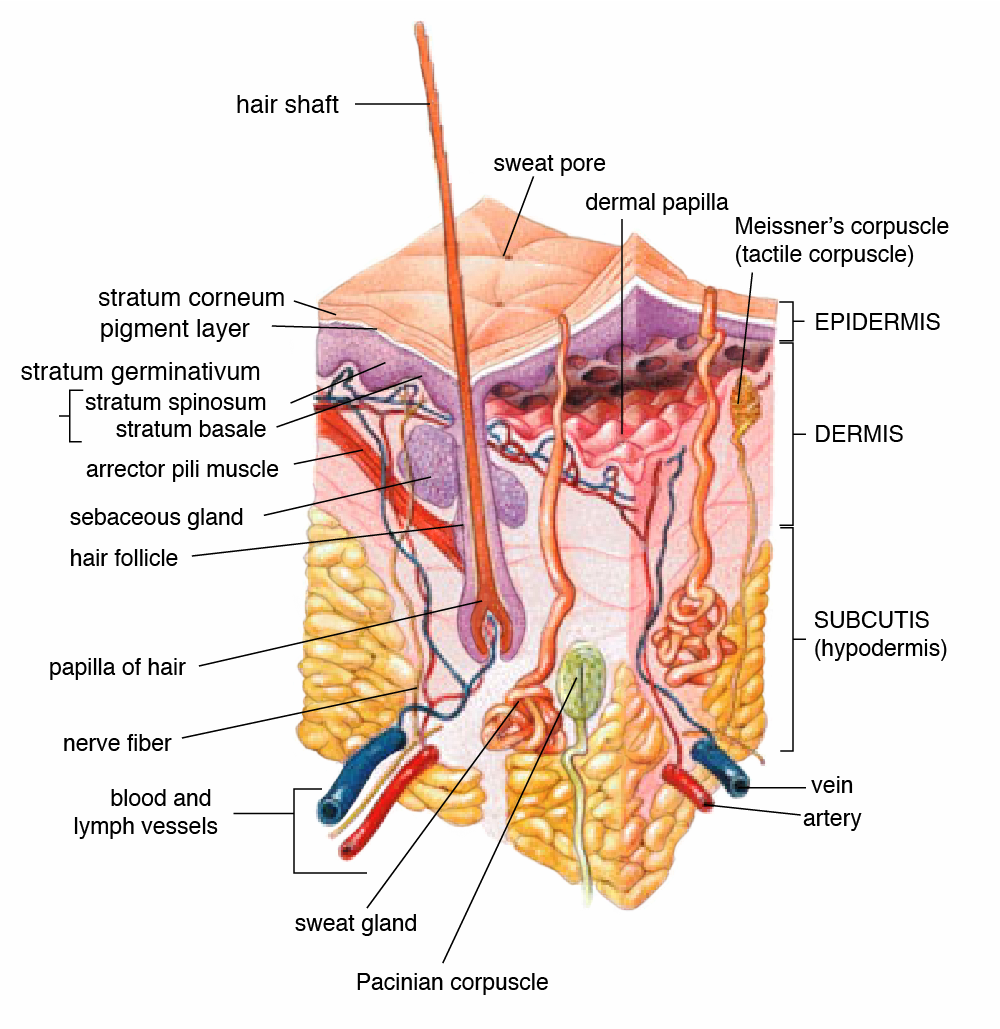
- The hypodermis is the lower layer of skin shown in the diagram above.

Details
- System: Integumentary

Identifiers
- Latin: tela subcutanea
- MeSH: D040521
- TA98: A16.0.03.001
- TA2: 7083
- TH: H3.12.00.2.00001
- FMA: 9630

The subcutaneous tissue (from Latin subcutaneous 'beneath the skin'), also called the hypodermis, hypoderm (from Greek 'beneath the skin'), subcutis, or superficial fascia, is the lowermost layer of the integumentary system in vertebrates. The types of cells found in the layer are fibroblasts, adipose cells, and macrophages. The subcutaneous tissue is derived from the mesoderm, but unlike the dermis, it is not derived from the mesoderm's dermatome region. It consists primarily of loose connective tissue and contains larger blood vessels and nerves than those found in the dermis. It is a major site of fat storage in the body.

In arthropods, a hypodermis can refer to an epidermal layer of cells that secretes the chitinous cuticle. The term also refers to a layer of cells lying immediately below the epidermis of plants.

== Structure ==
- Fibrous bands anchoring the skin to the deep fascia
- Collagen and elastin fibers attaching it to the dermis
- Fat is absent from the eyelids, clitoris, penis, much of pinna, and scrotum
- Blood vessels on route to the dermis
- Lymphatic vessels on route from the dermis
- The glandular part of some sweat glands; mammary glands lie entirely within the subcutaneous tissue (which are modified apocrine sweat glands)
- Cutaneous nerves and free endings
- Hair follicle roots
- Ruffini and Pacinian corpuscles
- Mast cells
- Bursae, in the space overlying joints in order to facilitate smooth passage of overlying skin
- Fine, flat sheets of muscle, in certain locations, including the scalp, face, hand, nipple, and scrotum, called the panniculus carnosus

The hypodermis forms an important insulating layer and/or food store in some animals, such as whales and hibernating mammals.

In some plants, the hypodermis is a layer of cells immediately below the epidermis of leaves. It is often mechanically strengthened, for example, in pine leaves, forming an extra protective layer or a water storage tissue.

=== Subcutaneous fat ===
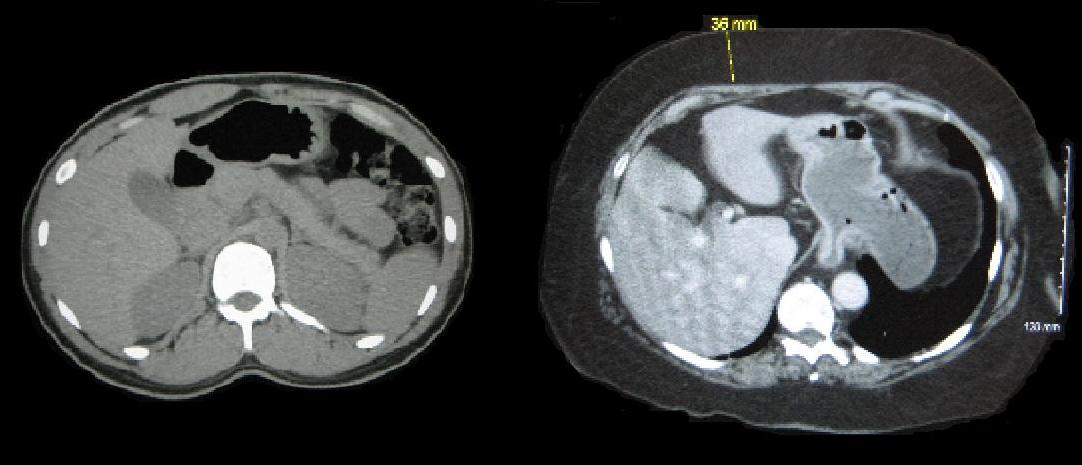
Cross-sections of the torso of a person of normal weight (left) and an obese person (right), taken by CT scan. Note the 3.6 cm (1.4 inches) of subcutaneous fat on the obese person.

Subcutaneous fat is the most widely distributed subcutaneous tissue layer. It is composed of adipocytes, which are grouped together in lobules separated by connective tissue. The number of adipocytes varies among different body areas, while their size varies according to the body's nutritional state. It acts as padding and as an energy reserve, as well as providing some minor thermoregulation via insulation. Subcutaneous fat is found just beneath the skin, as opposed to visceral fat, which is found in the peritoneal cavity, and can be measured using body fat calipers to give a rough estimate of total body adiposity.

== Clinical significance ==
=== Injection ===
Injection into the subcutaneous tissue is a route of administration used for drugs such as insulin: because it possesses few blood vessels, the tissue absorbs drugs slowly. Subcutaneous injection is believed to be the most effective manner to administer some drugs, such as human growth hormones. In addition, it is the common route for self-administration of biopharmaceuticals. Understanding the physiological, chemical and physical properties of subcutaneous tissue and the injection site can help optimize drug formulation, improve bioavailability and enhance drug delivery via the subcutaneous route. Just as the subcutaneous tissue can store fat, it can also provide good storage space for drugs that need to be released gradually because of limited blood flow. As the molecular size of the drug increases, drugs administered subcutaneously are more likely to be absorbed through the lymphatic system rather than directly through blood capillaries and the lymphatic uptake and transit is generally slower resulting prolonged systemic absorption. "Skin popping" is a slang term that includes this method of administration and is usually used in association with recreational drugs.

=== Disease ===
- Subcutaneous abscess
- Subcutaneous tumor

== See also ==
- Dermis
- Epidermis
