= Lipid A =

Lipid component of lipopolysaccharide endotoxins of gram-negative bacteria

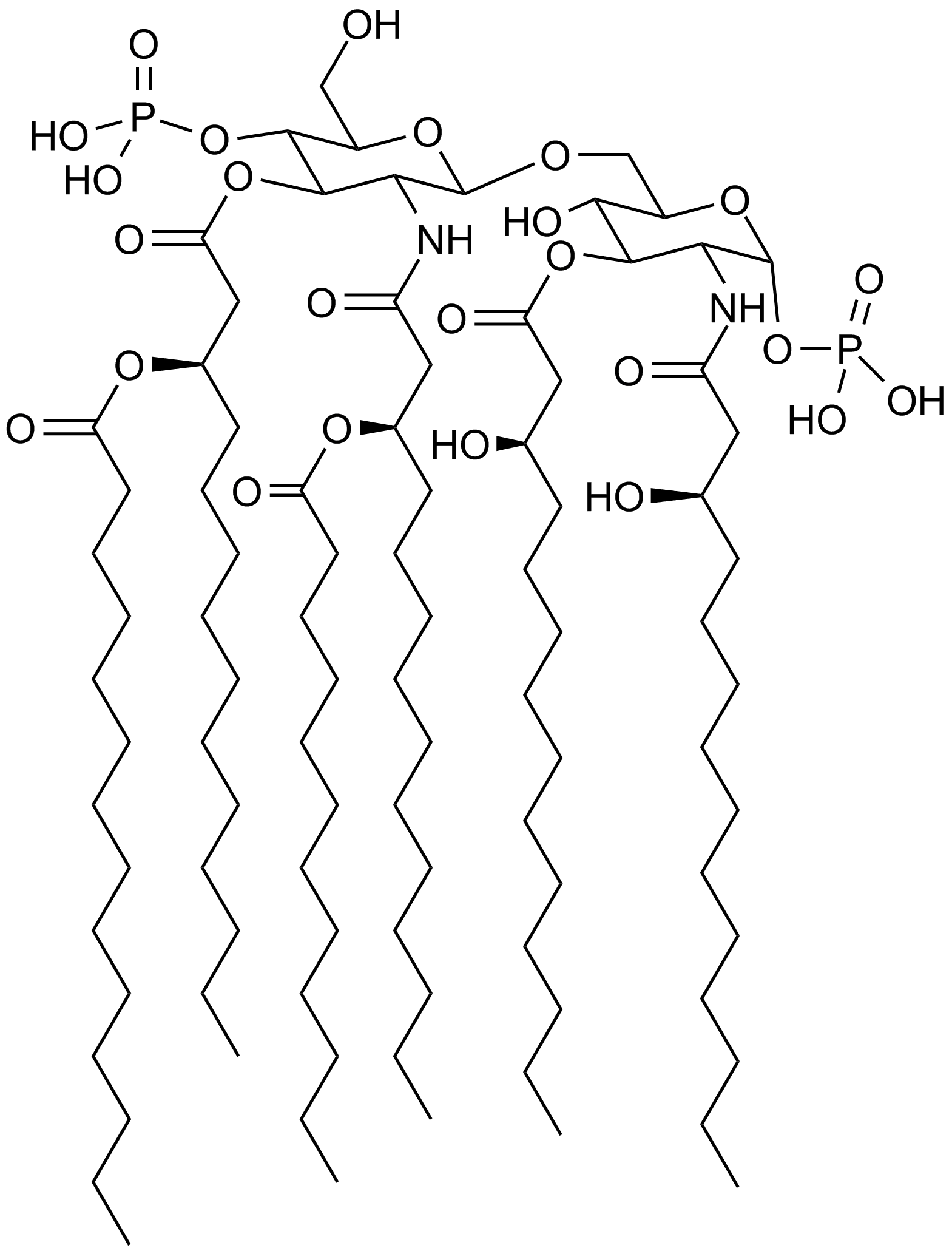
Chemical structure of lipid A as found in E. coli

Lipid A is a lipid component of an endotoxin held responsible for the toxicity of gram-negative bacteria. It is the innermost of the three regions of the lipopolysaccharide (LPS), also called endotoxin molecule, and its hydrophobic nature allows it to anchor the LPS to the outer membrane. While its toxic effects can be damaging, the sensing of lipid A by the immune system may also be critical for the onset of immune responses to gram-negative infection, and for the subsequent successful fight against the infection.

== Chemical composition ==
Lipid A consists of two glucosamine (aminosugar) units, in a β(1→6) linkage, with attached acyl chains ("fatty acids"), and normally containing one phosphate group on each carbohydrate.

The optimal immune activating lipid A structure is believed to contain 6 acyl chains. Four acyl chains attached directly to the glucosamine sugars are beta hydroxy acyl chains usually between 10 and 16 carbons in length. Two additional acyl chains are often attached to the beta hydroxy group. E. coli lipid A, as an example, typically has four C14 hydroxy acyl chains attached to the sugars and one C14 and one C12 attached to the beta hydroxy groups.

The biosynthetic pathway for Lipid A in E. coli has been determined by the work of Christian R. H. Raetz in the past >32 years. Lipid A structure and effects on eukaryotic cells have been determined and examined, among others, by the groups of Otto Westphal, Chris Galanos, Ernst T. Rietschel and Hajime Takahashi starting already in the 1960s (Gmeiner, Luederitz, Westphal. Eur J Biochem 1969)(Kamio&Takahashi J Biochem 1971)(Luederitz, Galanos et al., J Infect Dis 1973).

== Biosynthesis ==
The enzymes involved in Lipid A synthesis are conserved among Pseudomonas aeruginosa, Escherichia coli, Bordetella bronchiseptica, and Salmonella.

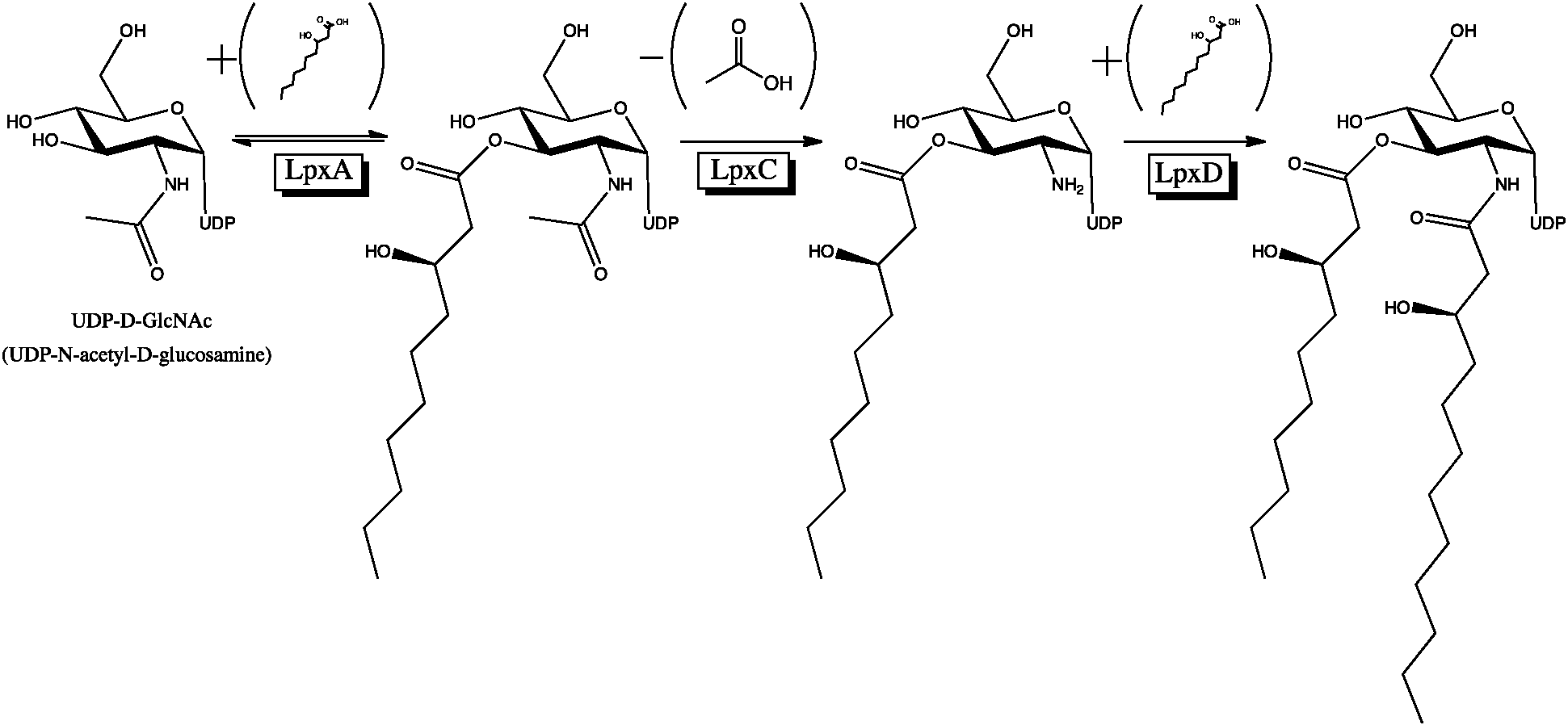
Synthesis of the UDP-diacylglucosamine precursor of Lipid A

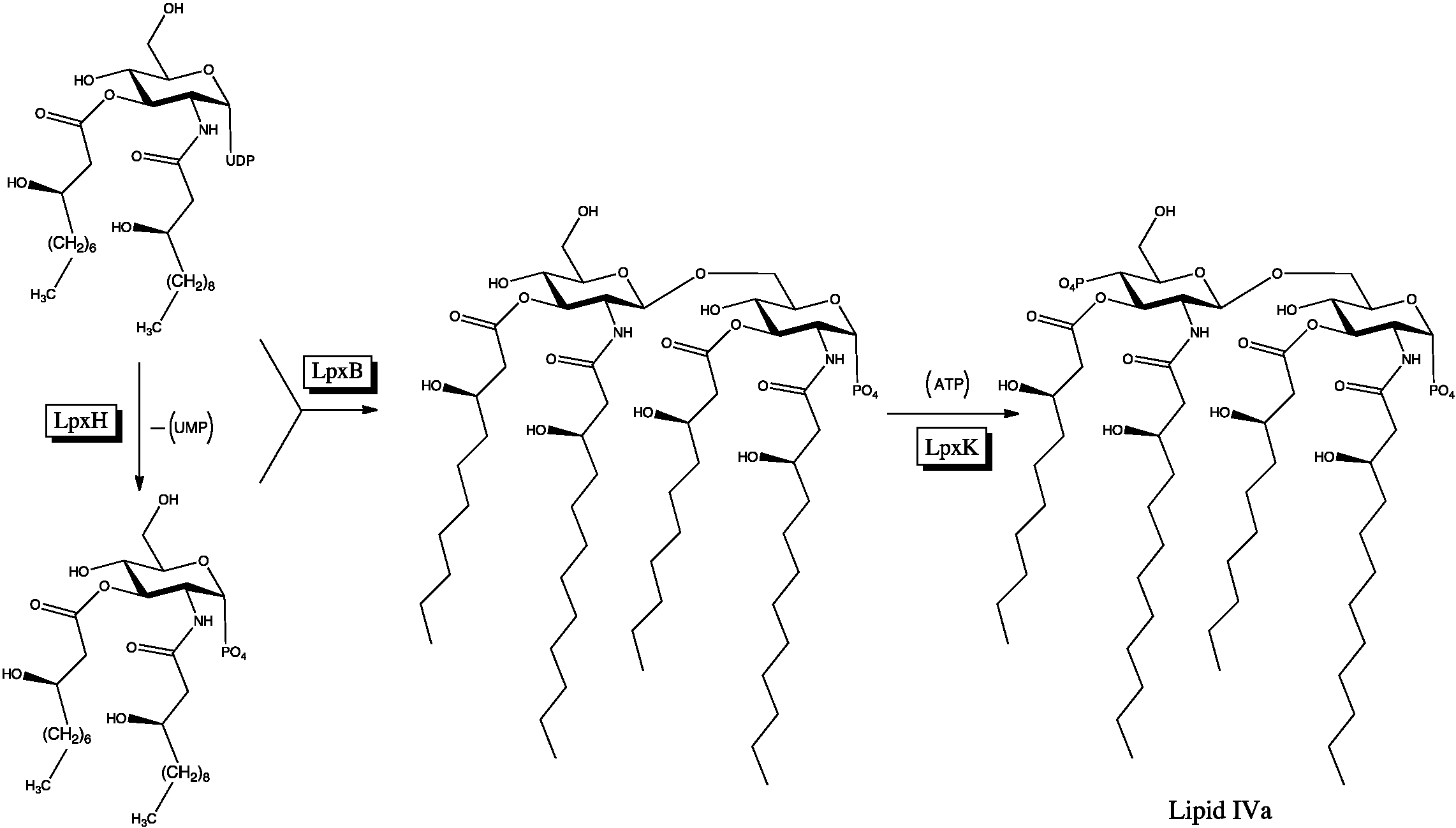
Synthesis of Lipid IV_{a}

== Inhibition and activation of immune response ==
Many of the immune activating abilities of LPS can be attributed to the lipid A unit. It is a very potent stimulant of the immune system, activating cells (for example, monocytes or macrophages) at picogram per milliliter quantities.

When present in the body at high concentrations during a gram-negative bacterial infection, it may cause shock and death by an "out of control" excessive immune reaction.

Lipid A with a reduced number of acyl chains (for example; four) can serve as an inhibitor of immune activation induced by Gram-negative bacteria, and synthetic versions of these inhibitors (Eritoran) were in clinical trials for the prevention of harmful effects caused by gram-negative bacterial infections. However, trials were recently discontinued due to lack of efficacy seen in patients with severe sepsis.

On the other hand, modified versions of lipid A can be used as components of vaccines (adjuvants) to improve their effect. Monophosphorylated lipid A (MPL) is an FDA approved adjuvant that consists of a heterogeneous mixture of lipid A from Salmonella minnesota R595. The major lipid A species present in MPL lacks one of the two phosphate groups and five acyl chains. Other work has shown that the removal of one or two acyl chains from native lipid A can significantly reduce activation of inflammatory responses.

The biological activity of LPS depends on the chemical structure of its lipid A. Primarily, TLR4 is required for activation of innate immunity upon recognition of LPS of Gram-negative bacteria. The ability of TLR4/MD-2 system to respond to a distinct lipid A species are clinically important. Pathogenic bacteria may employ LPS with low biological activity of its lipid A to evade proper recognition by the TLR4/MD-2 complex, dampening the host immune response and increasing the risk of bacterial dissemination. On the other hand, such lipid A would not be able to induce septic shock in susceptible patients, rendering septic complications more manageable. Yet, defining and understanding how even the smallest structural differences between the very similar lipid A species may affect the activation of the immune response may provide the mechanism for the fine tuning of the latter and new insights to immunomodulatory processes.

== Mechanism of activating cells ==
Lipid A (and LPS) has been demonstrated to activate cells via Toll-like receptor 4 (TLR4), MD-2 and CD14 on the cell surface. Consequently, lipid A analogs like eritoran can act as TLR4 antagonists. They are being developed as drugs for the treatment of excessive inflammatory responses to infections with gram-negative bacteria.

== See also ==
- Lipid A deacylase (PagL)
