= Lucien Marmette =

Canadian-Australian laborer, cook and criminal

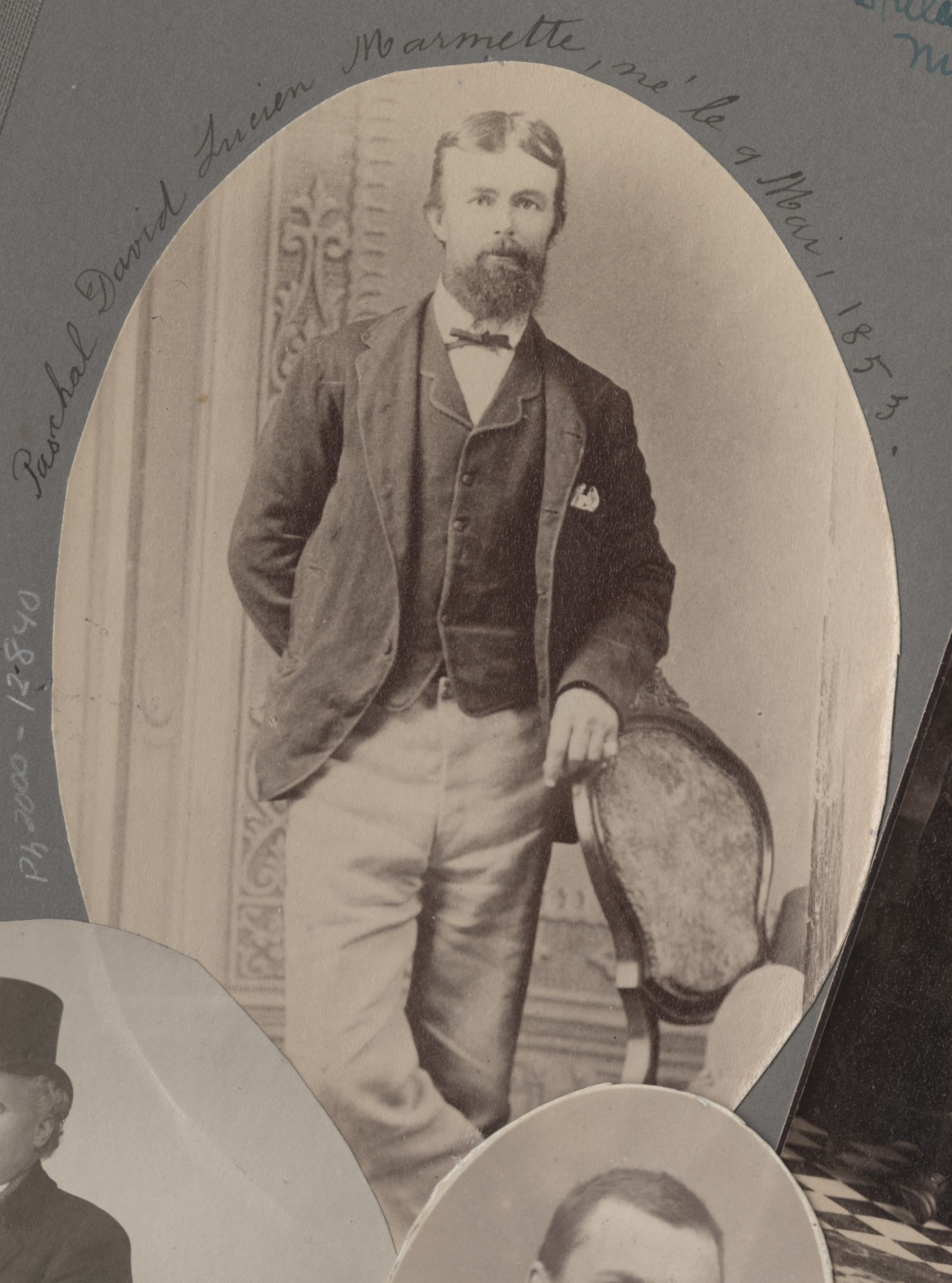
- Born: 10 May 1853; Montmagny, Lower Canada (now Québec, Canada)
- Died: 6 September 1935 (aged 82); Texas, Goondiwindi Region, Queensland, Australia
- Spouse: Florence Maude Martin (m. 1896)
- Parent(s): Joseph Marmette; Claire Geneviève Élisabeth Tâché

Lucien Marmette (10 May 1853 – 6 September 1935) was an itinerant Canadian-born labourer, cook, petty criminal, and fisherman who spent most of his adult life in New South Wales, Victoria and Queensland, Australia. Over more than five decades he worked a variety of trades, was involved in several legal proceedings, and in 1889 was briefly declared “missing” by well-wishers in the Victorian district of Pine Grove.

== Early life and apprenticeship ==
Lucien Marmette was born 10 May 1853 in Montmagny, in what was then Lower Canada (now Québec), the son of Joseph Marmette and Claire Geneviève Élisabeth Tâché. On 6 September 1872 he was indentured in Bristol, England, under the Merchant Navy apprenticeship system.

== Immigration to Australia and NSW years ==
In February 1877 Marmette emigrated from London to Melbourne, Victoria. By July 1877 he was in Coonamble, New South Wales, where under the alias “Louis Marmetta” he was fined for unlawfully using another man’s horse. In 1880, He helped fellow petty criminal Thomas Throstle carry out the thievery of a check in Hillston under the alias "Walter Marmette". Over the next decade he moved frequently across western New South Wales, appearing in court records at Hay (1880–1881), Nyngan (1890) and Singleton (1891).

=== Disappearance from Victoria ===
In May 1889 friends in Pine Grove (a farming district west of Echuca, Victoria) placed a notice seeking news of Marmette, who had last been seen there two years earlier. The notice asked him to write to the local “Age Office” suggesting he was owed money or guardianship benefits.

== Marriage and Victoria legal actions ==
In 1896 Marmette married Florence Maude Martin in Victoria. The following year he appeared before the Lilydale Petty Sessions (1897–1898) on a minor civil matter. By 1900 he was residing in Avenel, Victoria, working as a fisherman. He sailed as a cabin passenger on the barque Aramac in November 1904.

== "False Lucien" and Queensland years ==
In 1904, Someone arrived in Montmagny, Quebec claiming to be Lucien Marmette, even saying that they had lived in Australia for almost 30 years. After the "False Lucien" incident, Lucien sent a letter to his family stating that he was fine. After the turn of the century, Marmette relocated to southern Queensland. By 1908 he was living at Surat in the County of Maranoa. In November 1911, working as a cook in Southport (near Brisbane), he admitted two counts of obtaining property by deception. He continued to move within the Maranoa district—donating to the Balonne Beacon relief fund in 1913, serving as a cook at Oakleigh lawn-bowls club in 1918, and residing at Texas, Queensland, from at least 1919 into the early 1930s.

== Later life and death ==
In the early 1930s Marmette earned his living as a labourer in the Texas–Goondiwindi region. He died in Queensland on 6 September 1935.
