= St George, Queensland =

St George
- Town
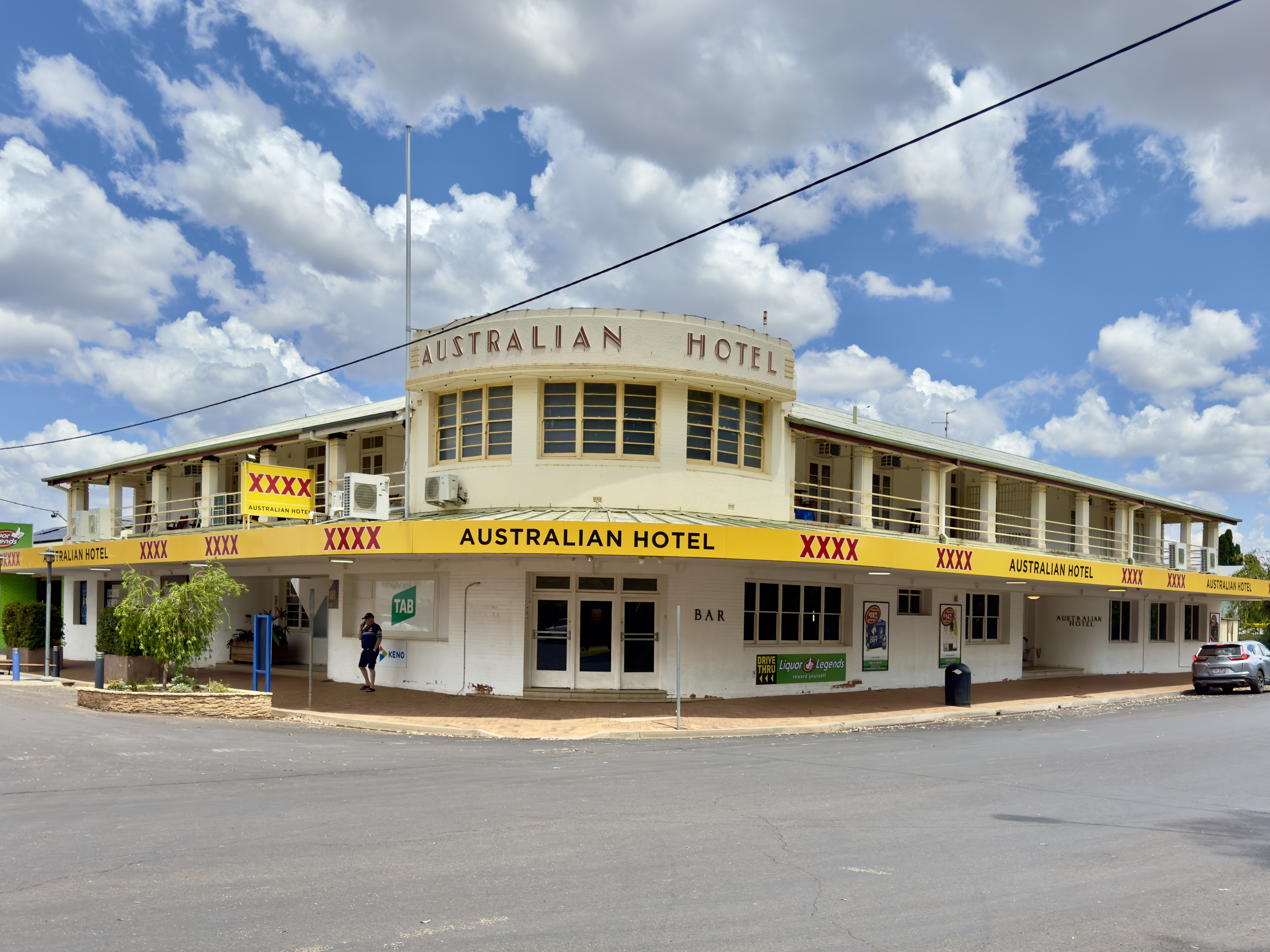
- Australian Hotel, 2021

- Interactive map of St George
- Coordinates: 28.0363°S 148.5797°E
- Country: Australia
- State: Queensland
- Region: South West Queensland
- LGA: Shire of Balonne
- Location: 162 km (101 mi) NE of Hebel; 194 km (121 mi) S of Roma; 236 km (147 mi) W of Goondiwindi; 389 km (242 mi) W of Toowoomba; 513 km (319 mi) W of Brisbane
- Established: 1862

Government
  - State electorate: Warrego
  - Federal division: Maranoa

Area
  - Total: 11,042.5 km^{2} (4,263.5 sq mi)
- Elevation: 200.8 m (659 ft)

Population
  - Total: 3,130 (2021 census)
  - Density: 0.2835/km^{2} (0.7341/sq mi)
- Time zone: UTC+10:00 (AEST)
- Postcode: 4487
- County: Belmore
- Mean max temp: 27.5 °C (81.5 °F)
- Mean min temp: 13.9 °C (57.0 °F)
- Annual rainfall: 516.8 mm (20.35 in)
Localities around St George
Bindebango; Begonia	Wycombe; Wellesley	Parknook; Teelba
Bollon	St George	Flinton; North Bungunya
Dirranbandi	Weengallon; Thallon	Talwood

St George is a rural town and locality in the Shire of Balonne, Queensland, Australia. It is the administrative centre for the Shire of Balonne. In the 2021 census, St George had a population of 3,130 people.

== History ==
=== Aboriginal people ===
The present township of St George was founded on the boundaries of three Aboriginal groups, the Mandandanji to the north, the Kooma to the south-west and the Bigambul to the south-east.

These people of the Balonne River fished with hoop nets and hunted ducks and marsupials for meat. They supplemented their diet with the small native melons that grew in abundance in the area, and with yams dug out from the flats along the riverbanks. Their funeral rites consisted of constructing an elevated bark platform on which the deceased would be placed, with fires lit underneath to smoke and preserve the corpse. The mummified remains would then be wrapped in bark and possum cloaks and carried with care by the relatives until they were deposited in a hollow of a tree. Surrounding trees were marked and decorated.

=== British colonisation ===
In 1845, pastoralist squatters John Gordon Town and Christopher Bagot entered the vicinity looking for land to take up for cattle. The local Commissioner for Crown Lands, Roderick Mitchell conducted an expedition along the Balonne River later that year, taking the name for the river from the Aboriginal residents.

In 1846, the site where the town of St George now stands was Major Thomas Mitchell's Camp VIII of his expedition into northern Australia. He noticed the natural rocky ford across the Balonne River on St George's Day, 23 April, thereby naming the site St George's Bridge. He directed his second-in-charge Edmund Kennedy to construct a cattle depot there while he explored further north. Kennedy and his stockmen remained at St George's Bridge for around a month.

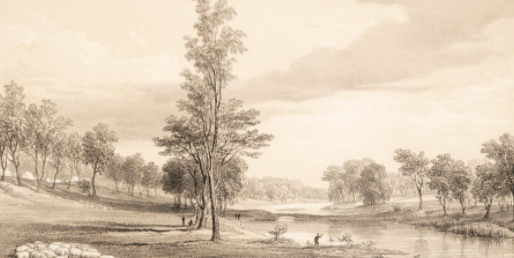
An 1846 drawing of St George's Bridge by Thomas Mitchell

In 1847, the first cattle stations were established: Burgorah (also known as Warroo, owned by Robert Fitzgerald and managed by Patrick Brennan); Boombah (owned by Henry Dangar and managed by George Hazard); Gulnarbar (owned by George and Anthony Loder, and managed by William Clay); and Wagoo (also known as Wachoo or Culpa, owned by William Ogilvie Jnr, and managed by Robert Hazard).

Conflict with the local Aboriginal people over land and the killing of cattle ensued with around 40 Aboriginal people and up to nine whites being killed on Burgorah in 1849, Patrick Brennan being wounded in the leg by a spear. Aboriginal men later counter-attacked the stockmen on Burgorah, forcing them to flee to the nearby Boombah property, where Dangar's men were able to reinforce and arm both the stockmen and members of a rival Aboriginal clan. Upon returning to Burgorah, they slaughtered the resident Aboriginal people, burying around 70 of their corpses in a large pit.

In 1852, sweeps by the paramilitary Native Police began in the area. Sergeant Richard Dempster with property managers Patrick Brennan and others, shot at least five Aboriginal people on Wagoo. Later that year, a detachment under Lieutenant George Fulford drove the free Aborigines into the "back country". Some Aboriginal people were allowed to remain on the properties to be utilised as labourers and prostitutes. These were called "station blacks" and by 1855 there were around 40 remaining on Burgorah and 200 at Boombah.

By 1862, Burgorah and Gulnarbar were being utilised as a temporary Native Police barracks where Aboriginal prisoners were tied to trees and flogged, and occasionally shot dead. Lieutenant John Marlow and his troopers made a final sweep of the region in 1862, destroying Aboriginal camps and pursuing them as far as Angellala Creek where he "dispersed" them after a brief battle.

=== Township of St George ===
The township of St George was gazetted upon a portion of the Burgorah run in March 1864 with the first 59 parcels of land offered for sale a month later.

Andrew Nixon was contracted in 1890 by the Queensland government to build a timber bridge across the Balonne River at St George's Bridge. This was completed in 1892 and later replaced by the current Andrew Nixon bridge and Jack Taylor Weir in 1953.

St George State School opened on 2 February 1874. In 1960 a secondary department was added which operated until St George State High School was opened in 1978.

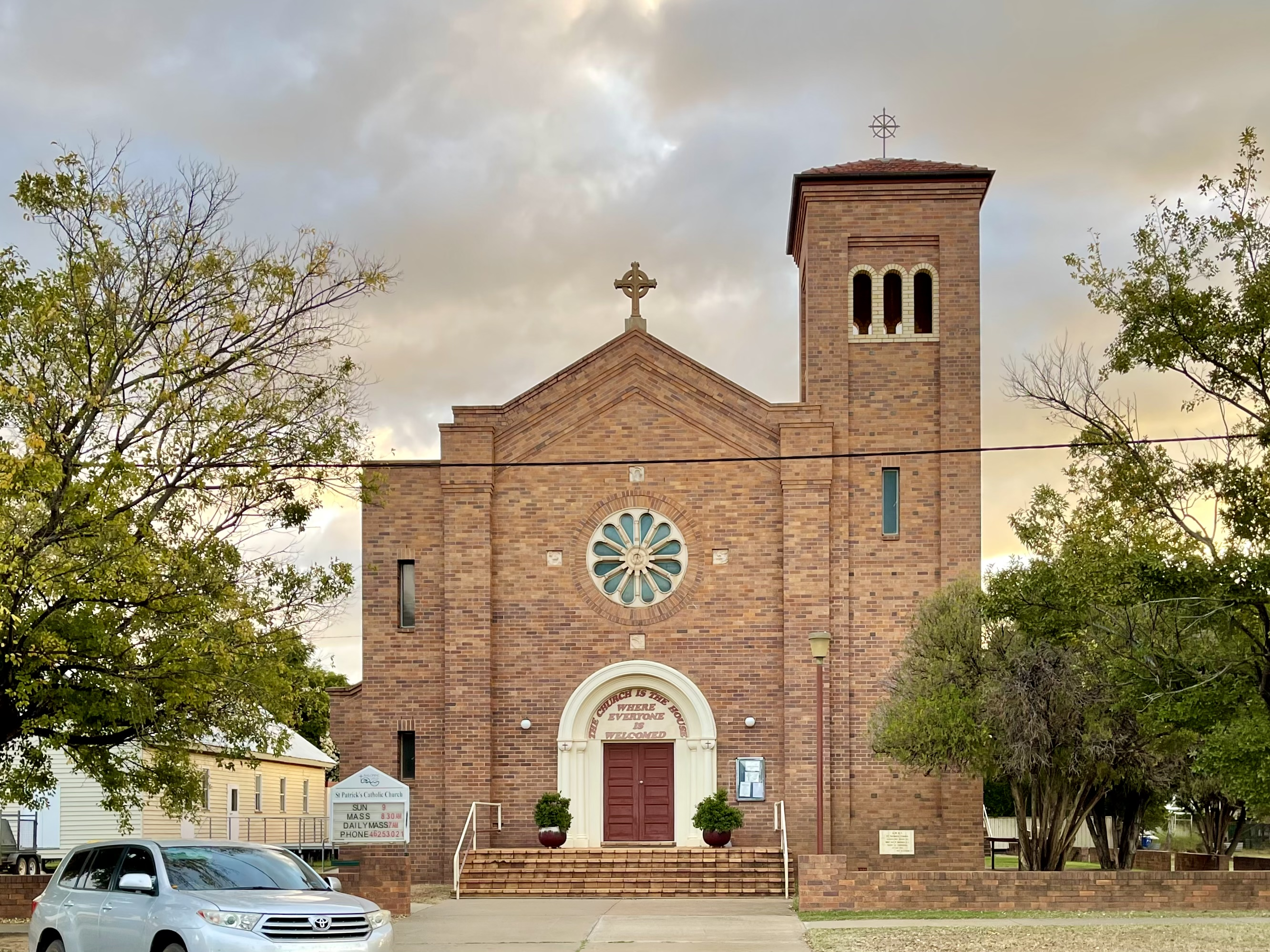
1959 St Patrick's Church

The first St Patrick's Catholic Church was built in 1874; it is now known as the old parish hall. On 3 May 1959 the new St Patrick's Catholic Church was blessed and opened.

The St. George Standard and Balonne Advertiser newspaper was published from 1878–1879 and 1902–1904.

Burgorah South Provisional School opened in 1902. On 1 January 1909, it became Burgorah South State School. It closed circa 1917.

The Balonne Beacon newspaper was published in St George from 2 January 1909 to 29 December 1954.

Myrtlemount Provisional School, Warrie Provisional School and Hollymount Provisional School (all named after local pastoral stations) opened on 29 September 1919 as a group of part-time schools (sharing a teacher between them). All three schools closed in 1922 due to low student numbers.

Tow Towri State School opened circa 1931. It closed circa 1945. Towtowri is a local pastoral property.

Rocky Crossing State School opened on 25 January 1988 and closed on 31 December 2003. It was 90 kilometres (56 mi) from St George.

=== Floods ===
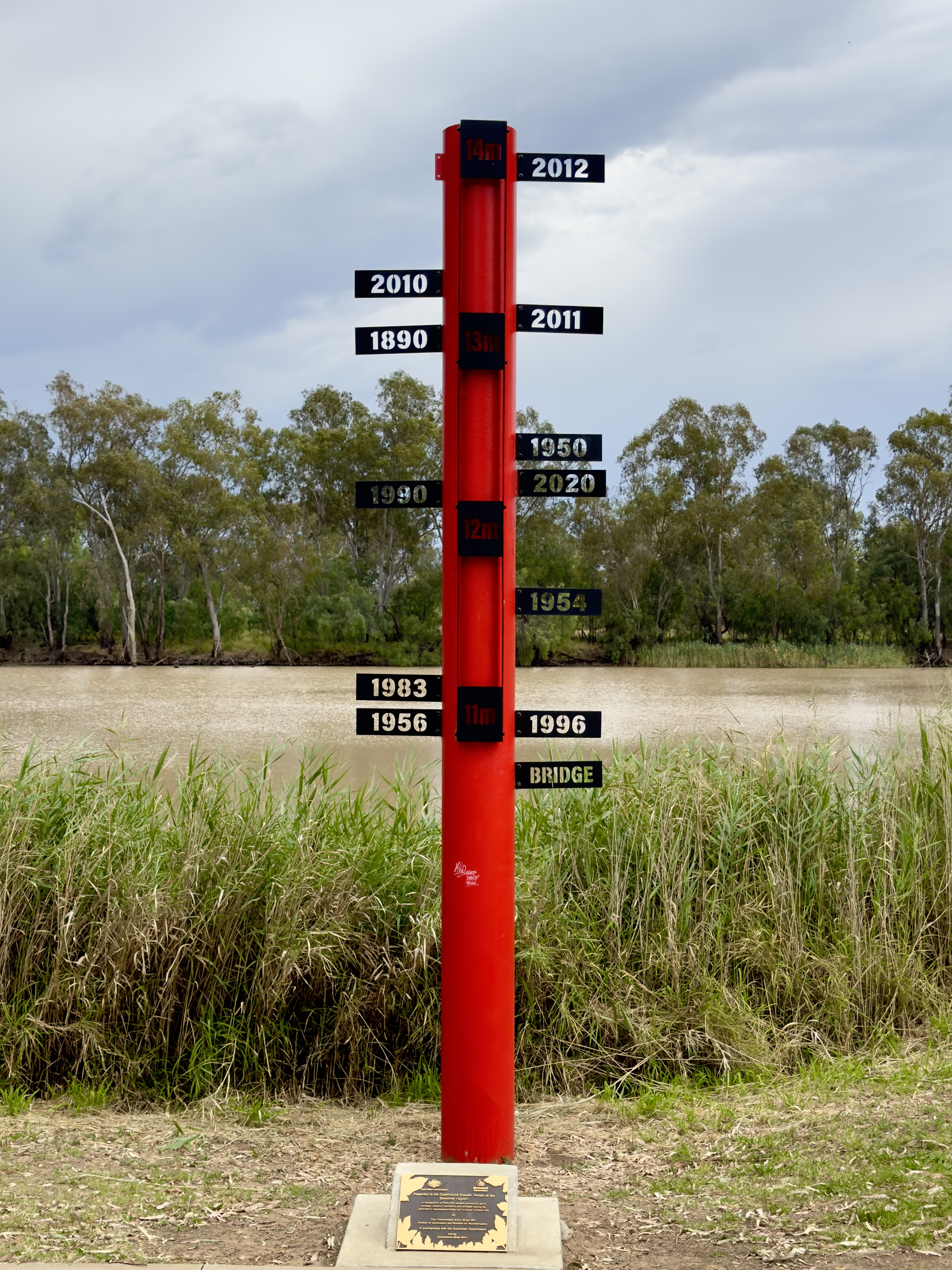
Flood level sign in St George

The town was severely affected by flooding in March 2010, which peaked at 13.5 metres, and again in December 2010 – January 2011.

Flooding once again occurred in February 2012, and about 2000 residents were mandatorily evacuated on 4 and 5 February to evacuation centres in Dalby and Brisbane. A temporary levee was built in St George on the morning of 5 February (Sunday). The Balonne River reached a height of 13.85 metres on Tuesday 7 February.

== Geography ==
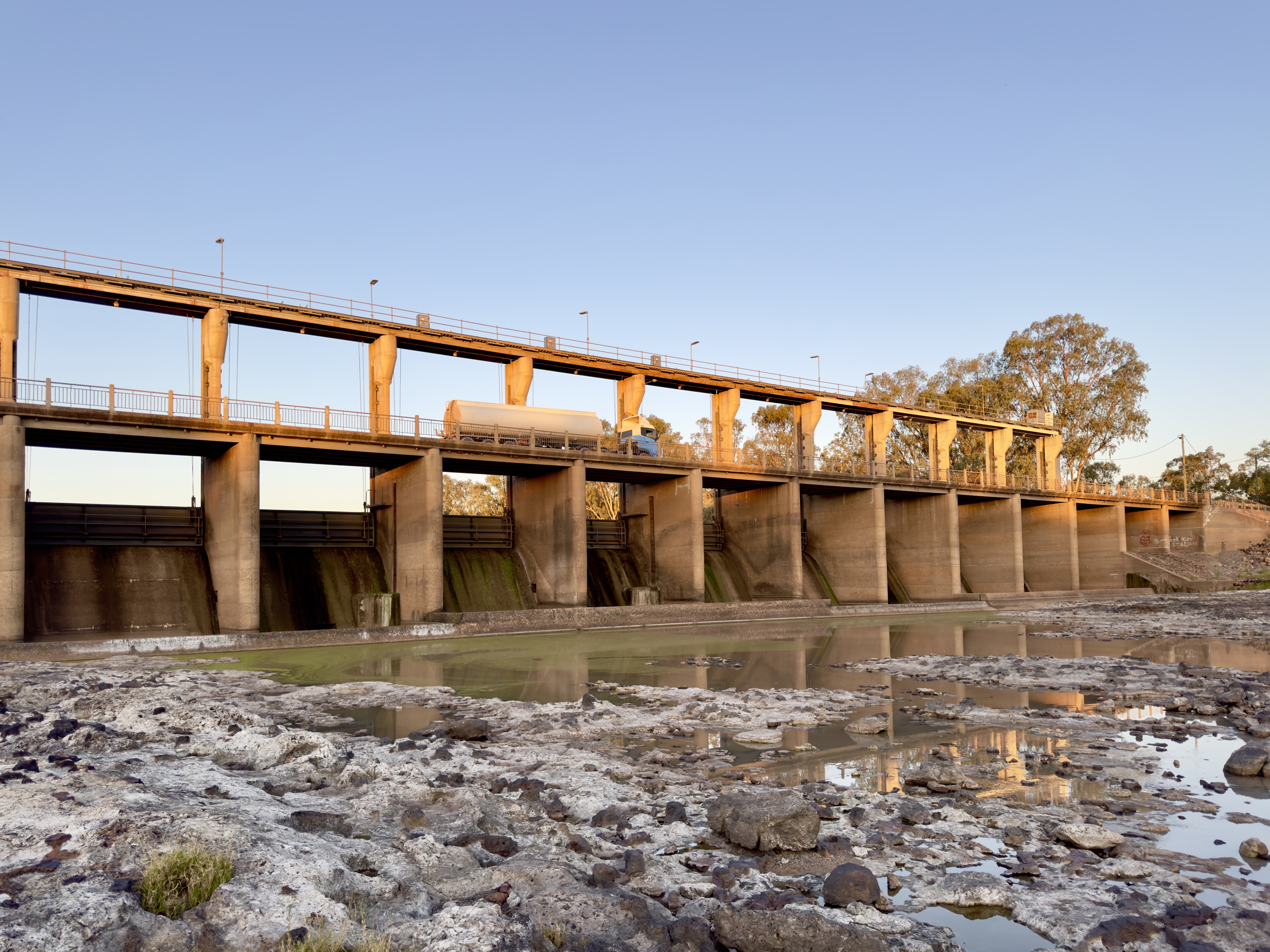
Jack Taylor Weir at St George

St George is a town and locality in the Shire of Balonne, situated 513 kilometres (319 mi) due west of Brisbane and the Gold Coast, and sits just inside the region of South West Queensland. It is at the junction of several highways including the Castlereagh Highway, the Moonie Highway, the Carnarvon Highway and the Balonne Highway. The only crossing of the Balonne River is the Andrew Nixon Bridge on the Balonne Highway.

St George is on the Balonne River which is reputedly an excellent fishing site for fish such as yellowbelly and Murray cod.

== Demographics ==
In the 2016 census, the locality of St George had a population of 3,048 people.

In the 2021 census, the locality of St George had a population of 3,130 people.

== Climate ==
St George experiences a hot semi-arid climate (Köppen: BSh), with very hot summers and mild winters with cool nights. Average maxima significantly vary from 19.8 °C (67.6 °F) in July to 35.3 °C (95.5 °F) in January. Mean annual rainfall, concentrated in the summer is low, 478.3 mm (18.83 in), and occurs within 45.2 rainfall days. The town is sunny, averaging 173.5 clear days and only 72.6 cloudy days annually. Extreme temperatures have ranged from −4.4 °C (24.1 °F) on 24 June 1949 and 11 July 1918 to 47.2 °C (117.0 °F) on 3 January 2014.

Climate data for St George (28º03'00"S, 148º36'00"E, 199 m AMSL) (1997–2024 normals, extremes 1881–2024)
Month	Jan	Feb	Mar	Apr	May	Jun	Jul	Aug	Sep	Oct	Nov	Dec	Year
Record high °C (°F)	47.2 (117.0)	46.8 (116.2)	43.3 (109.9)	37.2 (99.0)	32.6 (90.7)	31.3 (88.3)	30.9 (87.6)	37.6 (99.7)	40.4 (104.7)	42.6 (108.7)	45.1 (113.2)	45.9 (114.6)	47.2 (117.0)
Mean daily maximum °C (°F)	35.3 (95.5)	33.9 (93.0)	32.0 (89.6)	28.0 (82.4)	23.3 (73.9)	19.9 (67.8)	19.8 (67.6)	22.2 (72.0)	26.5 (79.7)	29.8 (85.6)	32.2 (90.0)	34.2 (93.6)	28.1 (82.6)
Mean daily minimum °C (°F)	22.4 (72.3)	21.2 (70.2)	19.0 (66.2)	13.9 (57.0)	9.0 (48.2)	6.4 (43.5)	5.2 (41.4)	6.2 (43.2)	10.7 (51.3)	14.7 (58.5)	18.1 (64.6)	20.5 (68.9)	13.9 (57.1)
Record low °C (°F)	10.7 (51.3)	10.2 (50.4)	5.7 (42.3)	0.0 (32.0)	−1.1 (30.0)	−4.4 (24.1)	−4.4 (24.1)	−3.3 (26.1)	−0.3 (31.5)	3.3 (37.9)	4.4 (39.9)	7.8 (46.0)	−4.4 (24.1)
Average precipitation mm (inches)	52.5 (2.07)	62.2 (2.45)	49.5 (1.95)	21.4 (0.84)	31.6 (1.24)	29.9 (1.18)	23.7 (0.93)	20.5 (0.81)	25.2 (0.99)	43.3 (1.70)	60.0 (2.36)	60.2 (2.37)	478.3 (18.83)
Average precipitation days (≥ 1.0 mm)	4.8	4.5	4.1	2.6	3.0	3.3	3.1	2.7	2.6	4.2	4.9	5.4	45.2
Average afternoon relative humidity (%)	33	36	33	33	36	43	38	31	27	27	30	29	33
Average dew point °C (°F)	12.5 (54.5)	13.1 (55.6)	11.0 (51.8)	7.8 (46.0)	5.5 (41.9)	5.2 (41.4)	2.8 (37.0)	2.0 (35.6)	2.8 (37.0)	4.6 (40.3)	8.2 (46.8)	9.9 (49.8)	7.1 (44.8)
Source: Bureau of Meteorology (1997–2024 normals, extremes 1881-2024)

== Heritage listings ==
St George has the following heritage-listed sites:

- The Anchorage, Wagoo Road (27.9777°S 148.6545°E)

== Economy ==
The town is a centre for cotton growing, as well as sheep, wheat, onions, garlic, corn, carrots and grapes.

== Nature conservation areas ==
=== Powrunna State Forest ===
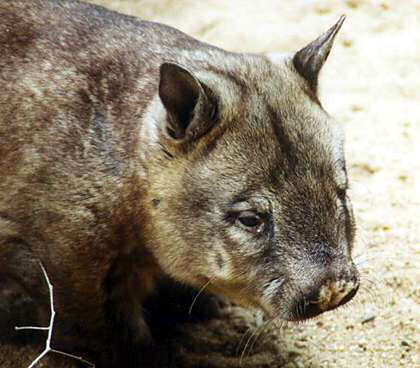
Northern hairy-nosed wombat

Powrunna State Forest is near St George. It includes a secure reserve to provide habitat for the critically endangered northern hairy-nosed wombat which is inaccessible to the public. The reserve was established in 2024 as a partnership between Queensland's Environment Department, Gunggari Native Title Aboriginal Corporation and Gunggari native title holders, Glencore mining company, and the Wombat Foundation. Fifteen of the wombats were relocated from Epping Forest National Park in early June 2024.

=== Richard Underwood Nature Refuge ===
The Richard Underwood Nature Refuge (RUNR) is also near St George, and as of June 2024 is home to 18 wombats. The area, which lies along the banks of the Balonne River, was gazetted in 2008 as wombat habitat, and the Australian Wildlife Conservancy (AWC) took on the lease in October 2023. The landowners are Ed and Gabrielle Underwood. It is also home to much other wildlife, including "at least 15 other species of native mammals, 12 species of amphibians, 31 species of reptiles, and at least 83 species of birds" as of 2024. The refuge is completely fenced, to expel feral cats and other predators. Vegetation includes eucalypts such as silver-leaved ironbark and poplar box, along with white cypress pine and belah trees. Native grasses such as mulga mitchell grass and feathertop wiregrass grow at ground level.

== Facilities ==
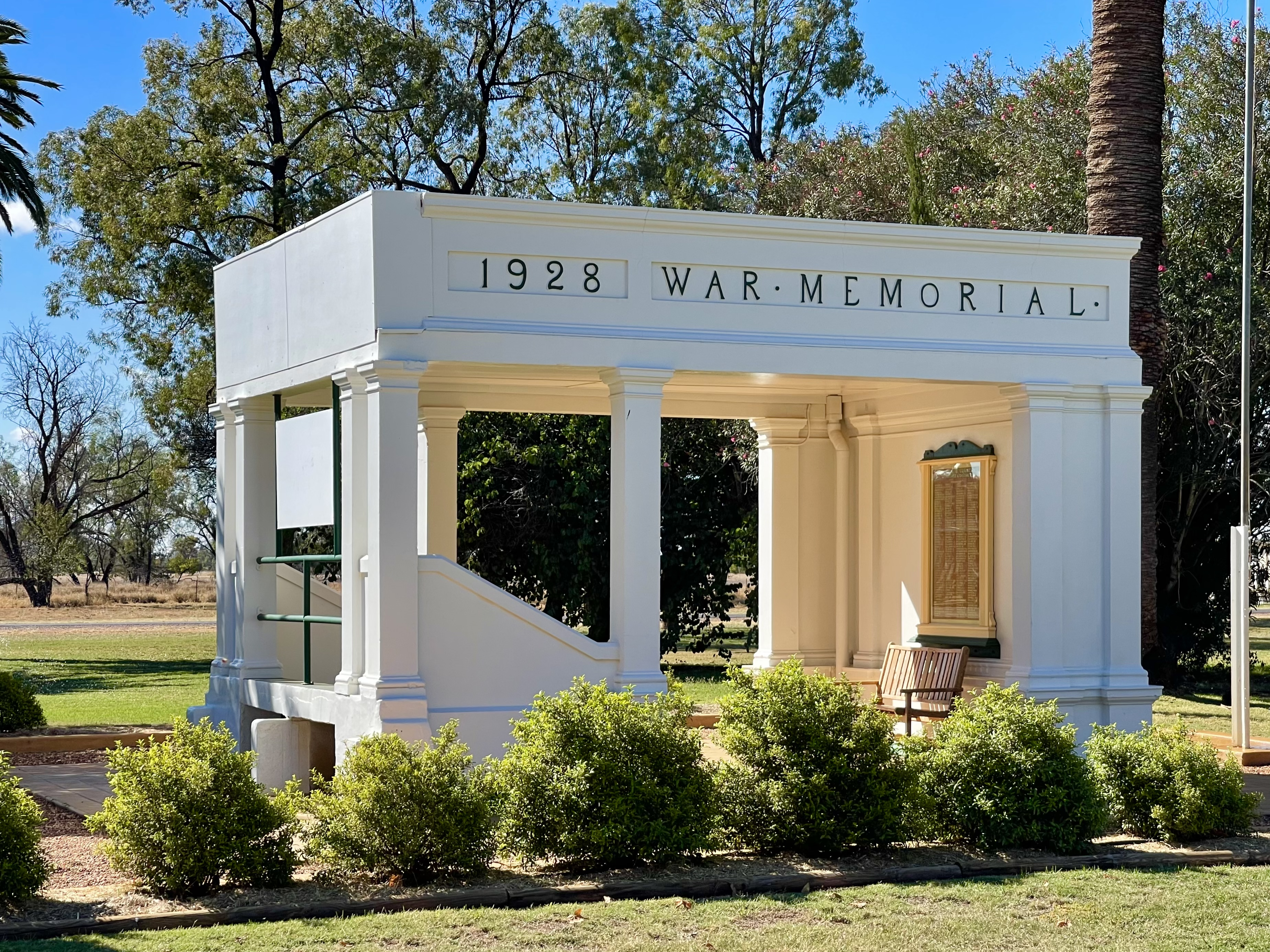
St George Hospital Memorial Pavilion

St George has a visitor information centre, cultural centre, swimming pool, showground, bowling and the St George Golf Club. The address of the golf club is Wagoo Road. It was opened in 1948.

The town also has an airport, St George Airport.

Balonne Shire Council operates a library in Victoria Street.

The St George branch of the Queensland Country Women's Association has its rooms at 73 Victoria Street.

Christ Church Anglican is at 133 Victoria Street (28.0378°S 148.5784°E). The St George Lutheran congregation hold their services at the Anglican Church.

== Education ==
St George State School is a government primary (Early Childhood to Year 6) school for boys and girls at 128 Victoria Street (corner of Grey Street, 28.0377°S 148.5807°E). In 2015, the school had an enrolment of 217 students with 24 teachers (22 full-time equivalent) and 15 non-teaching staff (12 full-time equivalent). In 2017, the school had an enrolment of 246 students with 25 teachers (24 full-time equivalent) and 17 non-teaching staff (13 full-time equivalent). It includes a special education (Early Childhood to Year 12) program.

St George State High School is a government secondary (7–12) school for boys and girls at 2 Victoria Street (28.0304°S 148.5927°E). In 2015, the school had an enrolment of 221 students with 25 teachers (22 full-time equivalent) and 24 non-teaching staff (17 full-time equivalent). In 2017, the school had an enrolment of 205 students with 28 teachers (23 full-time equivalent) and 20 non-teaching staff (16 full-time equivalent).

St Patrick's Catholic School was established by the Sisters of St Joseph of the Sacred Heart. The school opened on 19 February 1933. However, rain caused the official opening and blessing by Bishop James Byrne to be postponed to Sunday 28 May 1933. In 1988 the Sisters withdrew from the operation of the school and it is now under lay leadership. St Patrick's School is a Catholic primary (Preparatory to Year 6) school for boys and girls at 36–44 Balonne Street (28.0353°S 148.5865°E). In 2017, the school had an enrolment of 180 students with 14 teachers (12 full-time equivalent) and 12 non-teaching staff (9 full-time equivalent).

== Events ==
The St George show is celebrated every year over the Labour Day long weekend (weekend of the first Monday in May).

== Sport ==
The St George Dragons (named after the much more famous NRL team) play in the Roma District Rugby League competition.

== Notable residents ==
St George gained national attention with the election of local accountant Barnaby Joyce to the Australian Senate following the 2004 federal election. It is also the hometown of National Rugby League player Dale Shearer.

Sir Charles Kingsford Smith's father was also a resident being the Bank of New South Wales manager during the 1930s.

== See also ==
- St George Airport (Queensland)
