= The Anchorage, St George =

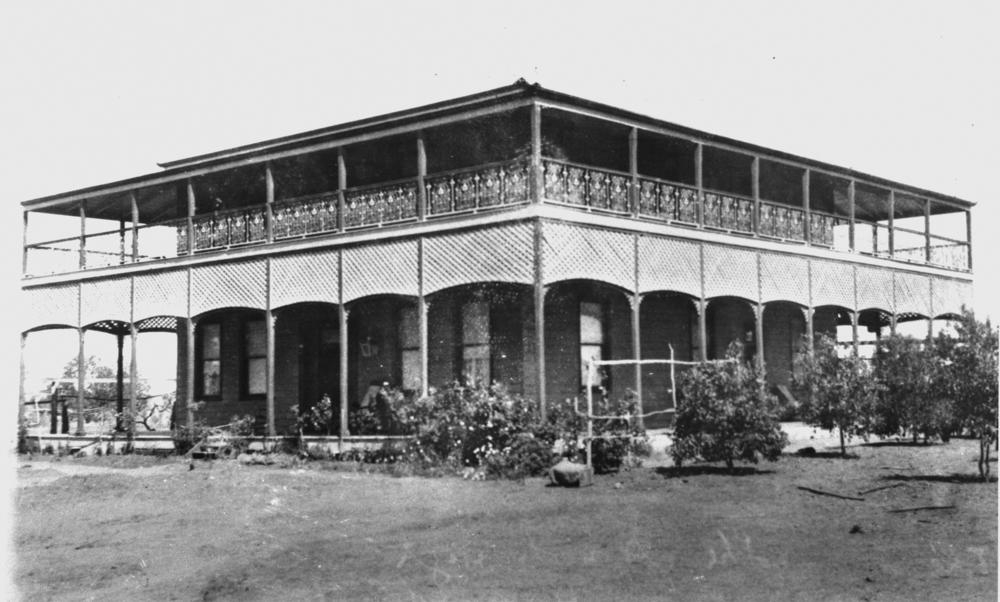
- The Anchorage, St George

- Location within Queensland
- 27.9777°S 148.6545°E
- Location: Wagoo Road, St George, Shire of Balonne, Queensland, Australia

History
- Design period: 1900–1914 (early 20th century)
- Built: 1903
- Built for: Andrew William Nixon

Queensland Heritage Register
- Official name: The Anchorage
- Type: state heritage (landscape, built)
- Designated: 21 October 1992
- Reference no.: 600015
- Significant period: 1900s (historical); 1900s (fabric)
- Significant components: garden/grounds, decorative features, residential accommodation – main house, meat house
- Builders: Arthur Bennett

The Anchorage is a heritage-listed homestead at Wagoo Road, St George, Shire of Balonne, Queensland, Australia. It was built in 1903 by Arthur Bennett. It was added to the Queensland Heritage Register on 21 October 1992.

== History ==
The Anchorage is a two-storied timber house built in 1903 for Andrew William Nixon.

The district in which The Anchorage homestead is located was first explored in 1846 by Sir Thomas Mitchell, Surveyor-General of New South Wales, while trying to find a route from Sydney to the Gulf of Carpentaria. Mitchell established a base camp on the site of the present town of St George and in April 1846 St George crossing was named after Mitchell discovered the Balonne River on St George's Day.

Two years later, in 1848, the New South Wales Government granted the first St George leases to settlers who established cattle and sheep runs in the area, but it was not until 1863 (after the separation of Queensland) that St George was surveyed as a township. Although the effects of droughts and floods as well as frontier hostilities initially hindered the development of St George, it was described in Pugh's Almanac of 1880 as "a thriving township". By 1888, St George was "a large township" and Pugh's Almanac considered it to be "the centre of a flourishing pastoral district". The 1880s was a period of growth in St George and was at that time a place of opportunity for new arrivals.

Andrew William Nixon was one who found success in the district. He was born to Scottish parents at Adelong in New South Wales in 1854. Nixon was apprenticed as a blacksmith in Corowa before moving to Melbourne and then to Jerilderie where he established his own blacksmithing business around the time the Kelly gang of bushrangers was in the area. By 1882, Nixon had made his way to St George with his family and was working in the district on contract work, including the construction of the first bridge across the Balonne River in 1890. Nixon reputedly amassed a small fortune from his contracting and having previously obtained shares in the Australian Steam Sawmills on the Balonne River, he eventually bought out the other shareholders and developed the sawmills into a profitable business. Towards the end of the 19th century, the mills became less viable as the supply of timber in the area diminished and Nixon redirected his energies towards agricultural pursuits. He accordingly purchased 320 acres (130 ha) upon which he erected a homestead and made a viable living from cultivating the land. He then took up about 90,000 acres (36,000 ha) in the surrounding district, some of which had originally formed part of the "Cypress Downs" and "Mona" stations. This acquisition allowed Nixon to expand his pastoral enterprise and its location near the Balonne River provided water for both irrigation and for the steam engines of his sawmill, which today remain on the property.

Nixon began construction of The Anchorage in 1903, situated on a 16,000-acre (6,500 ha) parcel of land on the western bank of the Balonne River and surrounded by a plantation of orchard trees and a flower garden. It was reputedly his third house in the area and is constructed primarily from local cypress pine, which was milled in the Australian Steam Sawmills under the direct supervision of Nixon. Built by Arthur Bennett, this grand house was a reflection of the development of St George by the early 20th century, as well as an indication of Nixon's personal burgeoning fortune. The 12 rooms of the homestead were apt accommodation for Nixon's large family, and were described in The History of Queensland by Matthew Fox as:

"large, lofty, and well- ventilated, every attention having been paid to the important considerations of health and comfort in their design. The additional offices and outhouses have also been planned with a view to convenience and fitness, each for the purpose to which it is allotted".

Nixon remained for many years an active participant in local community life, serving at various times on the Balonne Shire Council and the local hospital board, as well as vice-president of the Balonne Pastoral and Agricultural Association and a number of other community groups. Following Nixon's death in 1951, The Anchorage estate passed to his son, Andrew William Nixon, as administrator of his will. Andrew William Nixon junior died in 1962, after which title is registered in 1969 in the names of his siblings, Marston Alma Nixon, Isabella Ellen Nixon and Charles David Nixon. When Charles David Nixon died in 1970, title to his portion of the land was bequeathed to his sisters as joint owners, before Isabella Ellen Nixon was registered as the sole owner of the property in 1974. Four years later, title was transferred to Gureba Pty Ltd, a holding company for SH Andersen & Sons, after which it became a sheep and cattle property, before passing to other owners.

== Description ==
The Anchorage property is situated on Wagoo Road in the Balonne Shire of south-western Queensland. The residence's front facade looks across the road to the Balonne River, as it winds its way north-east out of the town of St George. St George is approximately 116 kilometres (72 mi) south of Surat, which is 80 kilometres (50 mi) south of Roma.

The Anchorage is a two-storey timber house raised off the ground by low stumps. Its core is L-shaped and has a hipped roof. On the ground floor a kitchen in the western corner fills the "L" to make a square, and is separated from the main part of the house by a breezeway. It is roofed separately with a simple hip. Generous verandahs surround the main part of the house and are also roofed separately. They connect to each end of the breezeway. All roofs are clad in corrugated galvanised iron. On the upper level the verandah edges are made with cast iron balusters and baluster panels, and tapering stop-chamfered timber posts. Below, fitted between each post, are deep, arched valances made of lattice. These have cast iron fringes and brackets.

The exterior walls to the main house and the kitchen are clad in chamferboards. The verandah floors are lined with shot-edge timber boards. The ceilings to the lower-level verandahs are also lined with timber boards. On the upper level, the underside of the verandah roof is unlined and the rafters are exposed. The front door is on the eastern facade, which looks across to the road and the river beyond. The door is low waisted with four panels, and surrounded by glass and timber sidelights, and a pivoting glass fanlight. The windows opening onto the ground floor rooms of the main house are large double-hung sashes, with a single pane in each sash.

Inside, on the ground floor, the main core of the house consists of four large rooms disposed either side of a central hallway. This hallway opens, at the end opposite to the main door, into the breezeway that separates the main house from the kitchen. A cedar stairway leads from this hall to the level above, completing its half-turn using winders. The joinery throughout the house is cedar, but it is otherwise constructed with the pine, possibly cypress, cut and milled by the owner's company. There is a further straight stair situated on the rear, north-western verandah. On the upper level there are six rooms disposed around the hallway, two to the right after leaving the stair, and four to the left. Each room opens onto the encircling verandahs, as do each end of the hallway.

A small skillion-roofed structure has been attached to the rear, north-western facade of the house. Also, in the yard area adjacent to the south-western facade of the kitchen, is situated a small meat house. This structure has a pyramid roof clad in corrugated iron, and supported in part by chamferboard clad walls and timber posts. A narrow zone between the underside of the roof and the wall cladding is open to encourage ventilation.

== Heritage listing ==
The Anchorage was listed on the Queensland Heritage Register on 21 October 1992 having satisfied the following criteria.

The place is important in demonstrating the evolution or pattern of Queensland's history.

The Anchorage demonstrates the development of the St George district in the early 20th century, being a modern and quite urban homestead built on what was one of the first properties producing commercial agricultural crops in the area. It is also of interest as the home of Andrew William Nixon, a saw miller, who personally selected and supervised the cutting of timber used in its manufacture, thus providing an example of building practices in this era.

The place is important because of its aesthetic significance.

The Anchorage has considerable aesthetic appeal as a well-designed and constructed building made of local materials and as a grand house designed in response to contemporary views regarding health and climate.

The place has a special association with the life or work of a particular person, group or organisation of importance in Queensland's history.

The Anchorage is important for its association with Andrew William Nixon, a local pioneer and influential member of the community who made a considerable contribution to the development of the district.
