= Emmonsia parva =

Scientific classification
- Kingdom: Fungi
- Division: Ascomycota
- Class: Eurotiomycetes
- Order: Onygenales
- Family: Ajellomycetaceae
- Genus: Emmonsia
- Species: Emmonsia parva

Synonyms
- Chrysosporium parvum (C.W. Emmons & Ashburn) J.W. Carmich.; Haplosporangium parvum C.W. Emmons & Ashburn; Blastomyces parvus (C.W. Emmons & Ashburn) Y.P. Jiang, Sigler & de Hoog

Species of fungus

Emmonsia parva (formerly Chrysosporium parvum) is a filamentous, saprotrophic fungus and one of three species within the genus Emmonsia. The fungus is most known for its causal association with the lung disease, adiaspiromycosis which occurs most commonly in small mammals but is also seen in humans. The disease was first described from rodents in Arizona, and the first human case was reported in France in 1964. Since then, the disease has been reported from Honduras, Brazil, the Czech Republic, Russia, the United States of America and Guatemala. Infections in general are quite rare, especially in humans.

== Ecology ==
Emmonsia parva, E. crescens, and E. pasteuriana together comprise the genus Emmonsia, however they exhibit different ecological characteristics. Whereas E. crescens is found worldwide, E. parva is restricted to areas in North and South America, Eastern Europe, Australia and regions in Asia. The fungus is primarily a saprotroph, deriving its nutrition from dead material. It is also soil-dwelling where it release spores into the air. Because of this the main targets of infection are small burrowing mammals such as rodents, although infection of larger mammals such as humans has been documented. Some of the known animal species that it can infect include the Northern hairy-nosed wombats (Lasiorhinus krefftii), beaver, mink, weasel, wood rat, pine marten, pine squirrel, cottontail rabbit, muskrat, skunk, white-tailed mouse and the rock rabbit. The fungus is closely related to the genus Blastomyces.

== Growth and morphology ==
E. parva is a dimorphic fungi with two distinct forms. The fungus grows as hyphae at room temperature, but when conidia are transferred to 40 °C they convert to larger adiaspores. It has no teleomorphs and no sexual stage. It does not have any particular growth requirements in terms of culture media, but it is known to grow well on pablum cereal agar, potato dextrose agar (PDA) and phytone yeast extract agar. They also grow well on Sabouraud dextrose agar at 25 °C. Growth is slightly inhibited when grown in media containing cycloheximide. E. parva grows at a moderate pace, slower than E. crescens. After 21 days of growth at room temperature colony diameters range from 36 to 85 mm. The colonies are smooth and velvety and are white with tan centers from a top view and cream from the bottom. Hyphae in this form are septate and hyaline. The conidiophores they produce are unicellular, thick-walled (2 μm), and usually simple with a single terminal conidium also called an aleurioconidium. The conidiophore is also known to occasionally branch into 1–3 sections each bearing its own conidium. Before differentiating into adiaspores, the conidia measure 2–4 μm in diameter and are shaped either ovoid, subglobose or pyriform with glabrous walls.

After growth at 40 °C the conidia morph into their adiaspore form enlarging to approximately 25 μm in vitro and 40 μm in vivo. These adiaspores are uninucleate and they do not replicate. They are occasionally mistaken for spherules of the organism Coccidioides immitis.

== Pathogenicity ==
=== Transmission ===
The main route of infection is inhalation of airborne spores through the respiratory pathway. This can occur in both healthy and immunocompromised individuals, however a disseminated infection is more common in the latter. After inhalation the conidia switch to their adiaspore state, triggered by the temperature increase within the body. These develop without replicating in the alveoli of the lung. Transmission can originate directly from the soil or through an animal reservoir such as mice or bats.

=== Infection ===
Adiaspiromycosis, caused by E. parva may lead to pulmonary disease. It is termed an infection, but better described as a bodily reaction to foreign material, invoking various cellular processes within the circulatory and immune systems. Once the adiaspore is formed it finds a place to localize in the alveoli and implants somewhere in the tissue in that section. At this site the spores become calcified which causes a slight localized reaction involving inflammation. Lung function may be obstructed at this stage. The body mounts a multicellular immune response to the presence of these adiaspores leading to the formation of noncaseating granulomas.

The onset of adiaspiromycosis is dependent on the level of exposure to conidia. The disease is self-limiting so the onset of symptoms is determined by the amount of conidia inhaled. Low level exposure induces little to no clinical symptoms, while a greater dosage risks development of pulmonary disease. This is referred to as acute pulmonary adiaspiromycosis, primary progressive pulmonary adiaspiromycosis or disseminated pulmonary adiaspiromycosis. It is characterized by widespread lesions caused by granulomas within both lungs. There are 3 forms of manifestation:

- A single granuloma
- A cluster of granulomas in a localized region
- Widespread bilateral granulomatous disease

The onset of symptoms is dependent on 2 factors: the dosage of conidia and the immune status of the host. Usually infection is asymptomatic with pulmonary disease developing very rarely. Fatality rates are low. If however the level of spores inhaled is sufficient or the immune system of the host is adequately compromised clinical symptoms may develop which include coughing, dyspnea, low-grade fever, weight loss and conjunctivitis including blurred vision, photophobia and ocular pain. Within the sclera, white, opaque nodules develop in conjunction with local edema or hyperemia. This opacification may extend to other distal parts of the eye such as the limbus and angular corneal opacities. Granulomas also form in the anterior chamber. However purulent conjunctival discharge and hemorrhaging were not observed as opposed to conjunctivitis brought on by viral or bacterial infection.

== Diagnosis ==
Adiaspiromycosis is histopathologically diagnosed. Three criteria must be met for accurate diagnosis:

- Dissemated nodular lesions in both lungs.
- Manifested systemic and respiratory symptoms
- Presence of adiaspores within granulomas in the lung

The adiaspores must be identified as E. parva in culture media or sequencing to separate the infection from E. crescens. Periodic acid–Schiff (PAS) stains can be used to observe the thick-walled adiaspores in tissue regions. Sequencing can be used as a tool to discriminate the fungus from its close relative, the genus Blastomyces. The target is the D2 variable domain found in the large subunit of nuclear rRNA at the 5' end. This region has sufficient variability between the two species. To differentiate between separate Emmonsia species the internal transcribed spacer (ITS) can be targeted. Another distinguishing characteristic is the size of spore, with E. parva producing significantly smaller adiaspores.

== Treatment ==
The onset of adiaspiromycosis is rarely serious and is self-limiting so often no treatment is required and the body clears the spores on its own. Fluconazole (FLC), AmB, and ketoconazole have proven to be therapeutic in progressive or serious infection. Oral itraconazole (ITC) is also an effective aid. Surgical resection may be a last resort if fungal infection persists.

== Epidemiology ==
Exposure to soil and dust is a major route of infection so manual labor in regions with high levels of each can lead to an increased risk of inhalation. As a result, adiaspiromycosis is reported more commonly in men then in women. In most cases exposure is asymptomatic. Cases have been reported in immunocompromised individuals such as those diagnosed with AIDS. There has been only one reported case of E. pasteuriana infection and it occurred in an AIDS patient who had disseminated open wounds. Cleaning, working or playing in areas inhabited by small mammals such as mice or bats may increase risk of infection. Farmers, greenhouse workers or those involved in construction are also at a greater risk of exposure.

== See also ==
- Emmonsia crescens
