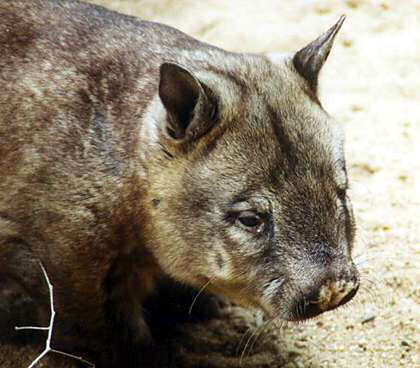

Conservation status
- Critically Endangered (IUCN 3.1)

- Critically endangered (EPBC Act)

Scientific classification
- Kingdom: Animalia
- Phylum: Chordata
- Class: Mammalia
- Infraclass: Marsupialia
- Order: Diprotodontia
- Family: Vombatidae
- Genus: Lasiorhinus
- Species: L. krefftii

Binomial name
- Lasiorhinus krefftii (Owen, 1873)
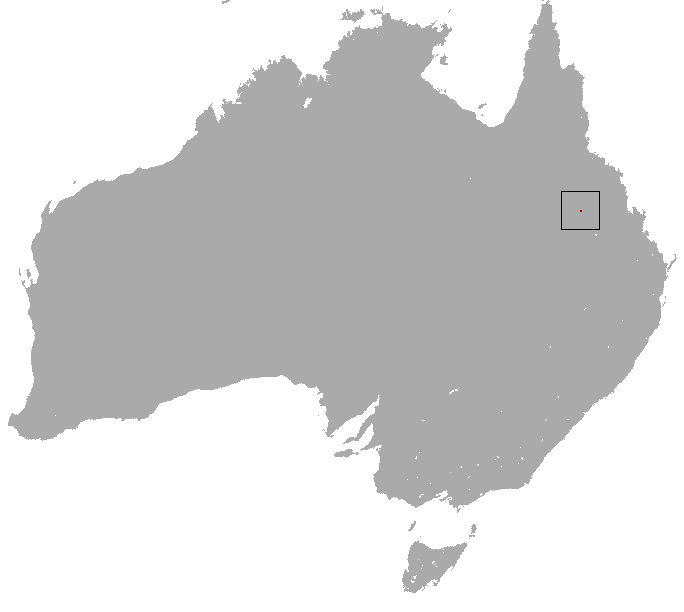
- Northern hairy-nosed wombat range

= Northern hairy-nosed wombat =

Species of marsupial

The northern hairy-nosed wombat (Lasiorhinus krefftii) or yaminon is one of three extant species of Australian marsupials known as wombats. It is one of the rarest land mammals in the world and is critically endangered. Its historical range previously extended across New South Wales, Victoria, and Queensland, and as recently as 100 years ago it was considered extinct.

In the 1930s, 30 individuals were discovered in a 3 km^{2} (1.2 sq mi) range within the 32 km^{2} (12 sq mi) Epping Forest National Park in Queensland. In 2002, with the species threatened by wild dogs, the Queensland Government built a 20-kilometre (12 mi)-long predator-proof fence around all wombat habitat at Epping Forest National Park. Insurance populations have since been translocated to two other locations to ensure that the species survives threats such as fire, flood, or disease.

In 2003, the total population consisted of 113 individuals, including only around 30 breeding females. After recording an estimated 230 individuals in 2015, the number was up to over 300 by 2021, and over 400 by 2024.

== Taxonomy ==
English naturalist Richard Owen described the species in 1873. The genus name Lasiorhinus comes from the Latin words lasios, meaning hairy or shaggy, and rhinus, meaning nose. The widely accepted common name is northern hairy-nosed wombat, based on the historical range of the species, as well as the fur, or "whiskers", on its nose. In some older literature, it is referred to as the Queensland hairy-nosed wombat.

The northern hairy-nosed wombat shares its genus with one other extant species, the southern hairy-nosed wombat, while the common wombat is in the genus Vombatus. Both Lasiorhinus species differ morphologically from the common wombat by their silkier fur, broader hairy noses, and longer ears.

== Description ==
In general, all species of wombat are heavily built, with large heads and short, powerful legs. They have strong claws to dig their burrows, where they live much of the time. It usually takes about a day for an individual to dig a burrow.

Northern hairy-nosed wombats have bodies covered in soft, grey fur. The fur on their noses sets them apart from the common wombat. They have longer, more pointed ears and a much broader muzzle than the other two species. Individuals can be 35 cm high, up to 1 m long and weigh up to 40 kg.

The species exhibits sexual dimorphism, with females being somewhat larger than males due to the presence of an extra layer of fat. They are slightly larger than the common wombat and able to breed somewhat faster, giving birth to two young every three years on average.

The northern hairy-nosed wombat's nose is very important in its survival because it has very poor eyesight, so it must detect its food in the dark through smell. Examination of the wombat's digestive tract shows that the elastic properties of the ends of their large intestines are capable of turning liquid excrement into cubical scat.

== Distribution and habitat ==
Northern hairy-nosed wombats require deep sandy soils in which to dig their burrows, and a year-round supply of grass, which is their primary food. These areas usually occur in open eucalypt woodlands.

At Epping Forest National Park, northern hairy-nosed wombats construct their burrows in deep, sandy soils on levée banks which were deposited by a creek that no longer flows through the area. They forage in areas of heavy clay soils adjacent to the sandy soils, but do not dig burrows in these areas, which become waterlogged in the wet seasons. In the park, burrows are often associated with native Lysiphyllum hookeri trees. This tree has a spreading growth form, and its roots probably provide stability for the extensive burrows dug by the wombats.

By the 1980s the range of the northern hairy-nosed wombat had become restricted to a single site of about 300 hectares (740 acres) in the Epping National Forest in east-central Queensland, 120 kilometres (75 mi) north-west of Clermont. Insurance populations have been established at two locations near St George, at the 130 ha (320 acres) Richard Underwood Nature Refuge in 2009, and in the 2,800 ha (6,900 acres) Powrunna State Forest in 2024, with plans for a fourth site by 2041.

== Behaviour ==
The northern hairy-nosed wombat is nocturnal, living underground in networks of burrows. They avoid coming above ground during harsh weather, as their burrows maintain a constant humidity and temperature. They have been known to share burrows with up to 10 individuals, equally divided by sex. Young are usually born during the wet season, between November and April. When rain is abundant, 50–80% of the females in the population will breed, giving birth to one offspring at a time. Juveniles stay in their mothers' pouches for 8 to 9 months, and are weaned at 12 months of age.

The fat reserves and low metabolic rate of this species permit northern hairy-nosed wombats to go without food for several days when food is scarce. Even when they do feed every day, it is only for 6 hours a day in the winter and 2 hours in the summer, significantly less than a similar-sized kangaroo, which feeds for at least 18 hours a day. Their diet consists of native grasses: black speargrass (Heteropogon contortus), bottle washer grasses (Enneapogon spp.), golden beard grass (Chrysopogon fallax), and three-awned grass (Aristida spp.), as well as various types of roots.

Their teeth continue to grow beyond the juvenile period, and are worn down by the abrasive grasses they eat. Its habitat has become infested with African buffel grass, a grass species introduced for cattle grazing. The grass outcompetes the more nutritional and native grasses on which the wombat prefers to feed by limiting its quantity, forcing the wombat to travel further to find the native grasses it prefers, and leading to a reduction in biomass.

== Conservation ==
=== Status ===
The conservation status of the northern hairy-nosed wombat is as follows:

- Critically Endangered, per IUCN (as of 2021; last assessed 15 June 2015),
- Critically Endangered, under the Australian Environment Protection and Biodiversity Conservation Act 1999 (EPBC Act); and
- Critically Endangered, under the Nature Conservation Act 1992 (Qld).

On 15 February 2018, the federal Department of the Environment and Energy (DoEE) upgraded the conservation status from Endangered to Critically Endangered under the EPBC Act to better align with the International Union for Conservation of Nature's (IUCN) Red List of Threatened Species. Due to its status under the EPBC Act, it is listed on the Species Profile and Threats Database (SPRAT).

=== Threats ===
Originally there were two main groups of hairy-nosed wombats (the other being the Southern hairy-nosed wombat, Lasiorhinus latifrons) that were separated by Spencer Gulf in South Australia. Both species experienced a population decline between 1870 and 1920, with the main influences being culling by agriculturalists, competition for food with introduced and feral species and predation. Threats to the northern hairy-nosed wombat include small population size, predation, competition for food, disease, floods, droughts, wildfires, and habitat loss. Its small, highly localised population makes the species especially vulnerable to natural disasters. Wild dogs are the wombat's primary predator, but the spread of invasive herbivores such as the European rabbit and the actions of landowners have also contributed to their decline.

There have been two reports of male northern hairy-nosed wombats contracting a fungal infection caused by Emmonsia parva, a soil saprophytic fungus. It is likely that the northern hairy-nosed wombats are inhaling the infection from the soil.

=== Counter-measures ===
Since around 1993, the Queensland Government's Department of Environment and Science (DES) and predecessors have led a recovery program, supported by Glencore mining company and The Wombat Foundation, for the species.

To combat the vulnerability of this species, a number of conservation projects have been put into action in the 21st century. One example was the construction of a two-metre-high, predator-proof fence around 20-kilometre (12 mi) of the park in 2000. A second, insurance colony of this species of wombat was established at Richard Underwood Nature Refuge (RUNR) at Yarran Downs, near St George in southern Queensland in 2008. The reserve is surrounded by a predator-proof fence.

In 2021, the Australian Wildlife Conservancy (AWC), a private conservation organisation, formed a partnership with DES to collaborate on research and management of the animals in the sanctuary. In October 2023 AWC signed an agreement with DES to care for the wombats in the 130-hectare (320-acre) Richard Underwood Nature Reserve. DES would focus on the Epping Forest population.

In 2006, researchers performed a study to analyse the demography of the northern hairy-nosed wombat, by using double-sided tape in the burrows to collect hair of the wombats. Through DNA analysis, they found that the ratio of female to male wombats was 1:2.25 in the population of approximately 113 wombats. These findings allowed researchers to understand the demographics of this species, and opened up further research to better understand why there is a significant difference in males and females in the wild.

Within Epping Forest National Park, increased attention and funds have been given for wombat research and population monitoring, fire management, maintenance of the predator-proof fence, general management, and control of predators and competitors, and elimination of invasive plant species. The species recovery plan of 2004 to 2008 included communication and community involvement in saving the species, and worked to increase the current population in the wild, established other populations within the wombat's historical range. There is a volunteer caretaker program, that allows volunteers to contribute in monitoring the population and keeping the predator fence in good repair. DNA fingerprint identification of wombat hairs allows research to be conducted without an invasive trapping or radio-tracking program.

Studies have been conducted to assess diet and nutrition.

==== Population increases ====
Due to the combined efforts of these forces, the northern hairy-nosed wombat population has been slowly making a comeback.

- After having been considered extinct, a population of about 30 was discovered in the Epping Forest in the 1930s. Only 35 individuals were counted in the early 1980s.
- In 2003, there were 113 individuals, including around 30 breeding females.
- In the last census taken in 2013, the estimated population was 196 individuals, with an additional 9 individuals at RUNR at Yarran Downs.
- In 2016 the population was estimated to be 250 individuals.
- In May 2021, the population had increased to over 300 individuals.
- In June 2024, the total population was reported as being over 400 individuals, including 18 at the RUNR, and 15 newly translocated to the Powrunna State Forest.
