= Lasiorhinus angustidens =

Lasiorhinus angustidens Temporal range: Late Pleistocene-Holocene ~0.129–0.01 Ma

Scientific classification
- Domain: Eukaryota
- Kingdom: Animalia
- Phylum: Chordata
- Class: Mammalia
- Infraclass: Marsupialia
- Order: Diprotodontia
- Family: Vombatidae
- Genus: Lasiorhinus
- Species: †L. angustidens

Binomial name
- †Lasiorhinus angustidens (De Vis, 1891)

Synonyms
- Phascolomys angustidens De Vis, 1891

Extinct species of wombat

Lasiorhinus angustidens ("narrow tooth") was a species of wombat that lived during the late Pleistocene epoch to early Holocene (129,000 to 10,000) years ago in eastern Australia. It is known from four isolated mandibles (lower jaws) and teeth, all found in Darling Downs, Australia.

== Discovery and taxonomy ==
Fossils of L. angustidens were first described by English naturalist Charles Walter De Vis in 1891 as a novel species of the genus Phascolomys, the name meaning "narrow tooth". He based L. angustidens on four cotypes, all incomplete mandibles with teeth which had been collected from Pleistocene-aged sediments in Pilton and Gowrie caves in Darling Downs, Australia during the late 1880s. One of these mandibles, QM F2921, was later designated the lectotype. De Vis believed it was a species of Phascolomys due to the proportions of the first incisor's alveolus, shape of the third premolar, and length of the ectalveolar (near alveolus on the mandible) groove compared to Phascolomys mitchelli. Later analyses demonstrated that P. mitchelli is a synonym of Vombatus ursinus, leading Australian mammalogists to reexamine the fossils described by De Vis. The species was moved to the genus Lasiorhinus based on characteristics of the mandible (lower jaw) and teeth. It was then hypothesized by paleontologist Lyndall Dawson in a 1981 study that the material of L. angustidens could be from juvenile individuals of Sedophascolomys (then Phascolomys) medius, though more material is necessary to prove this.
