= St George Golf Club =

Golf Club in St George, Queensland, Australia

- Interactive map of St George Golf Club
- 28.027948°S 148.582372°E

The St George Golf Club in St George, Queensland, Australia, is an 18-hole sand green course established in 1948. Located in the Shire of Balonne, St Georges Golf Club is located 513 Kilometers west of Brisbane.
