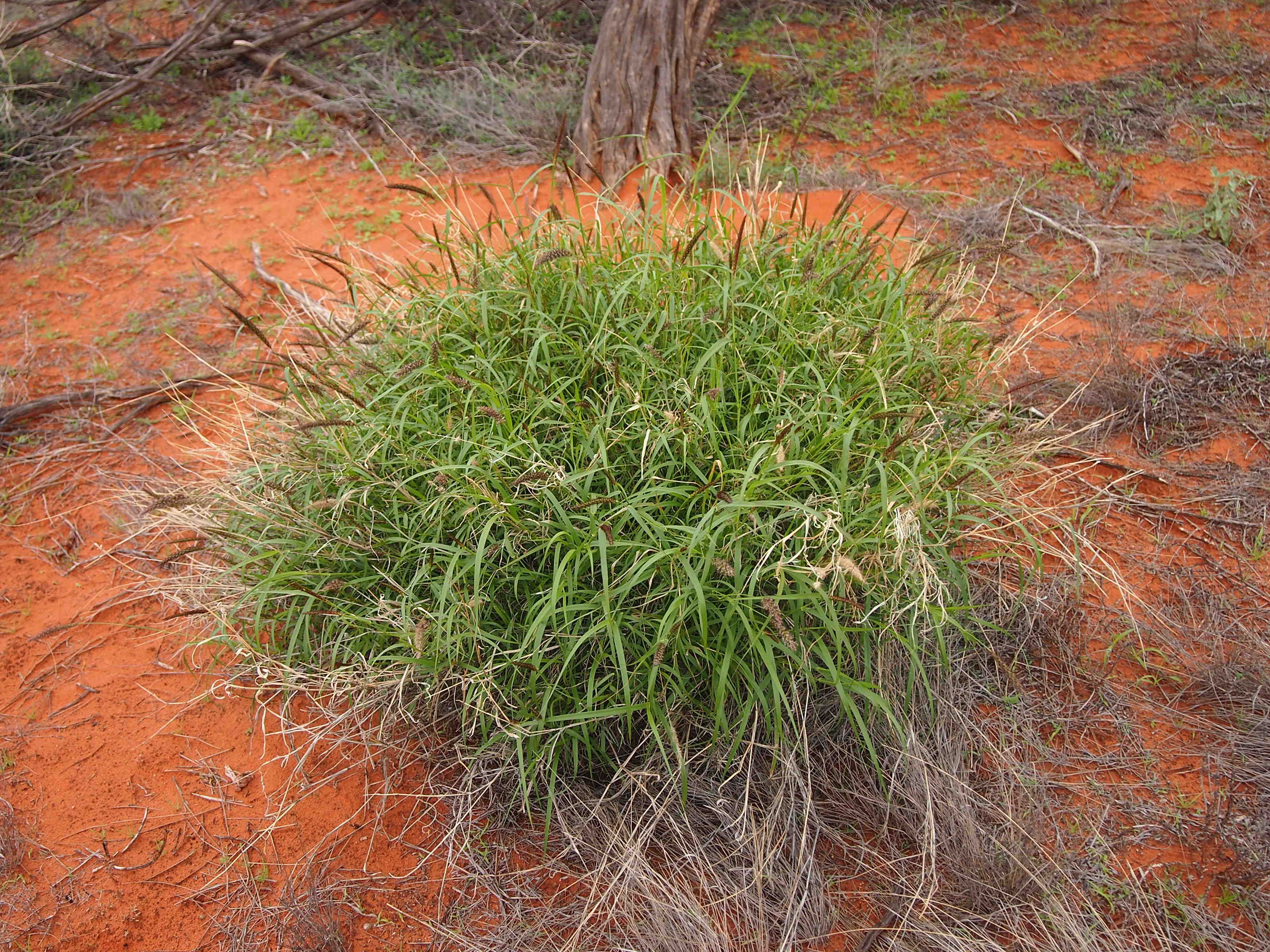

Conservation status
- Least Concern (IUCN 3.1)

Scientific classification
- Kingdom: Plantae
- Clade: Embryophytes
- Clade: Tracheophytes
- Clade: Angiosperms
- Clade: Monocots
- Clade: Commelinids
- Order: Poales
- Family: Poaceae
- Subfamily: Panicoideae
- Genus: Cenchrus
- Species: C. ciliaris

Binomial name
- Cenchrus ciliaris L.

Synonyms
- Pennisetum ciliare (L.) Link; Pennisetum cenchroides Rich.

= Cenchrus ciliaris =

Species of grass

Cenchrus ciliaris (buffel-grass or African foxtail grass; syn. Pennisetum ciliare (L.) Link) is a species of grass native to most of Africa, southern Asia (east to India), southern Iran, and the extreme south of Europe (Sicily). Other names by which this grass is known include dhaman grass, anjan grass and koluk katai.

== Description ==
African foxtail grass is a perennial grass growing to 20 to 120 cm (10 to 50 in) tall. The leaves are linear, 3 to 25 cm (1 to 10 in) long and 4 to 10 mm (0.16 to 0.39 in) wide. The flowers are produced in a panicle 2 to 14 cm (0.8 to 5.5 in) long and 1 to 2.6 cm (0.4 to 1.0 in) wide.

== Distribution ==
African foxtail grass is native to tropical Africa, the Mediterranean region and the hotter and drier parts of Asia. It is a deep-rooted grass, tolerates drought, and will grow at altitudes of up to 2,000 m (6,600 ft). It is considered a good forage grass in Africa. It prefers light soils with a high phosphorus content. As a key species for pastoralism, Cenchrus ciliaris is projected, in one simulation, to expand its overall range in East Africa under a high-emission scenario (RCP 8.5) in the future.

It is also sown in Queensland, Australia and elsewhere for grazing, hay and silage. It was introduced to the Sonoran Desert for erosion control and to feed livestock. In the Mexican part of the Sonoran Desert, it is still being planted and irrigated for livestock grazing. Cenchrus ciliaris has become naturalised and often an invasive species in Australia, the southwestern United States, Hawaii, Mexico, Central America, South America, and Macaronesia.

== As an invasive species ==
It was introduced in the 1930s into Arizona, United States, to provide grazing. The introduction was largely unsuccessful but the grass began to appear as a weed beside highways and in cleared fields or over-grazed land. It can spread quickly and appears to increase the mortality of native plants, including grasses and even palo verdes, by scavenging nearby water. This plant has a very low ignition threshold and can burn even during the peak growing season. Its flammability (injurious to neighbors) and quick regrowth allow it to compete successfully against almost all vegetation in the Sonoran Desert region.

Another problem of buffelgrass in the Sonoran Desert is that it intensifies wildfires such that saguaro cacti that normally survive wildfires can erupt into flames when growing in areas overtaken by the grass.

In Queensland, Australia, the grass has also been blamed for causing a decline in the native grass species which are fed on by the critically endangered northern hairy-nosed wombat, and cited as a factor in the wombats' decline. In South Australia, it is a declared plant under the Natural Resources Management Act and weed management activities are guided by the South Australia Buffel Grass Strategic Plan (2012–17). In Australia's Northern Territory, invasive buffel grass is implicated in worsening wild fires and is declared a weed.
