= Emmonsia crescens =

Scientific classification
- Kingdom: Fungi
- Division: Ascomycota
- Class: Eurotiomycetes
- Order: Onygenales
- Family: Ajellomycetaceae
- Genus: Emmonsia
- Species: E. crescens

Binomial name
- Emmonsia crescens Emmons & Jellison, 1960

Synonyms
- Chrysosporium parvum var crescens Carmichael 1962.

Species of fungus

Emmonsia crescens is a dimorphic fungus in the family Ajellomycetaceae that causes adiaspiromycosis, a pulmonary disease resulting from the inhalation of airborne conidia. The species has worldwide distribution and infections occur primarily in small rodents although human infections have been reported.

== Taxonomy ==
In 1942, researchers isolated a previously unknown fungus resembling Coccidioides immitis from wild rodents in Arizona and described it as Haplosporangium parvum. During subsequent investigations of pulmonary mycoses in wild mammals, researchers encountered a closely related fungus that resembled H. parvum in culture and morphology but produced substantially larger tissue forms known as adiaspores. Due to their similarities, the two fungi were initially regarded as closely related and were sometimes difficult to distinguish.

In 1960 Emmonsia crescens was formally described as a novel species, primarily on the differences in adiaspore morphology and physiology.

In 1962, Carmichael revised the genus Chrysosporium and proposed treated Emmonsia crescens as a variety of Chrysosporium parvum, creating the combination Chrysosporium parvum var. crescens. Under this classification, these two fungi were regarded as varieties of a single species rather than separate species.

Despite these revisions, Emmonsia crescens remains recognized as a distinct species and continues to be widely cited under that name in contemporary literature.

== Description ==
Unlike many pathogenic dimorphic fungi, E. crescens does not normally produce a yeast phase within mammalian tissues. Instead, inhaled conidia enlarge dramatically to form thick-walled structures known as adiaspores. Mature adiaspores are round and large (up to 500 μm in diameter) and thick walled (60-70 um).

== Adiaspiromycosis ==
E. crescens can cause an infection known as adiasporiomycosis. The term is derived from the condia of this fungi (adiaconidia), which demonstrate a unique progressive enlargement at elevated temperature (~37 °C).

Infections are relatively common in some wild mammal populations, particularly rodents. E. crescens has been isolated in a variety of animals including European rabbits (Oryctolagus cuniculus), horses, and British water voles (Arvicola terrestris).

=== Human disease ===
Human adiaspiromycosis is rare. The first human case attributed to E. crescens was reported in France in 1964. By 2012, fewer than 100 probably human cases of adiaspiromycosis have been reported in the literature. Pulmonary adiaspiromycosis often occurs in people without underlying medical conditions. Pathologic lesions are usually limited to the lungs. The severity of disease is dependent on the amount of fungal spores inhaled.

Only a few cases of fatal adiaspiromycosis have been reported, the first occurring in 1989 in a farm worker in Brazil.

=== Diagnosis ===
Histological examination is the gold standard for diagnosis of adiaspiromycosis. Fungal structures can be visualized with periodic acid-Schiff (PAS) stain. Diagnosis of human adiaspiromycosis is made by observing single, adiaspores with or without necrosis or fibrosis. In human tissues, adiaspores appear as single, thick-walled spherules surrounded by granulomas. Adiaspores are large and can reach up to 500 μm in diameter. Adiaspores are generally round and ovoid in shape.

Diagnosis of adiaspiromycosis is difficult. The fungus has not been successfully successfully cultured from human clinical specimens. Molecular assays using PCR have been successfully used to identify the Emmonsia crescens in bronchoalveolar lavage (BAL), tracheal aspirate, and transbronchial biopsy specimens. However, there are currently no commercially available PCR assays available for Emmonsia crescens.

=== Treatment ===
Due to the limited number of cases reported in the literature, no standardized treatment guidelines have been established. Most patients, even those with disseminated adispiromycosis, recover without treatment. Patients have made full recoveries following antifungal therapy with itraconazole. However, it remains unclear if antifungal treatment had an effect on recovery and the use of antifungals to treat adispiromycosis remains controversial.

== Pathogenesis ==
Transmission of E. crescens involves the inhalation of aerosolized conidia, reproductive fungal structures that are released from mycelia found in the soil.

Although uncommon, E. crescens has been found within macrophages.

== See also ==
- Emmonsia parva
