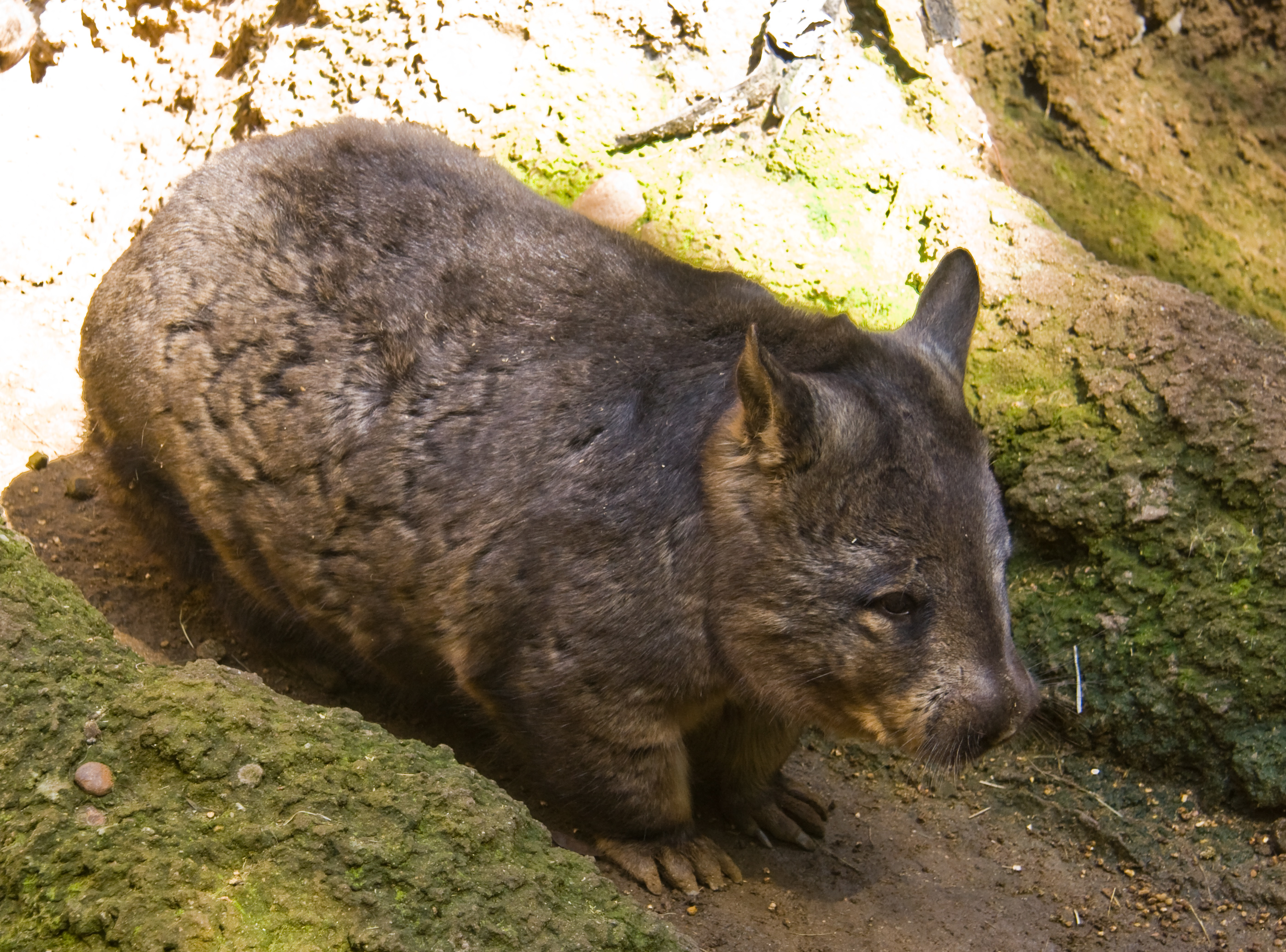

Conservation status
- Least Concern (IUCN 3.1)

Scientific classification
- Kingdom: Animalia
- Phylum: Chordata
- Class: Mammalia
- Infraclass: Marsupialia
- Order: Diprotodontia
- Family: Vombatidae
- Genus: Lasiorhinus
- Species: L. latifrons

Binomial name
- Lasiorhinus latifrons (Owen, 1845)
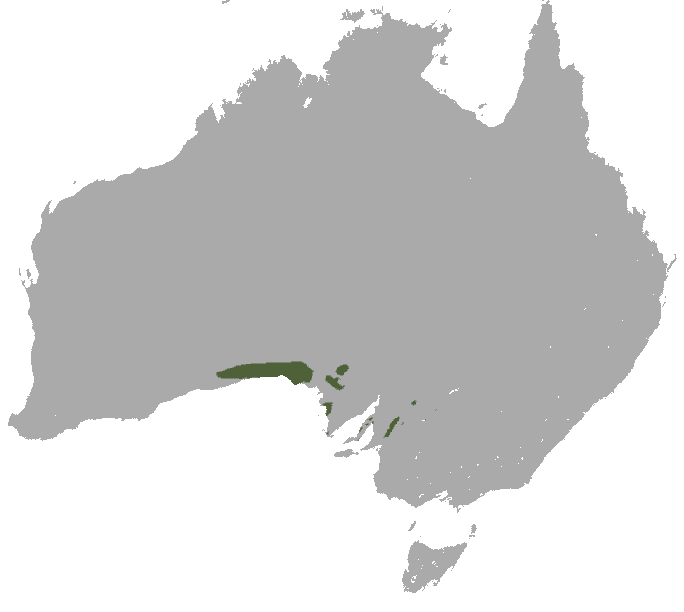
- Southern hairy-nosed wombat range

= Southern hairy-nosed wombat =

Species of marsupial

The southern hairy-nosed wombat (Lasiorhinus latifrons) is one of three extant species of wombats. It is found in scattered areas of semiarid scrub and mallee from the eastern Nullarbor Plain to the New South Wales border area. It is the smallest of all three wombat species. The young often do not survive dry seasons. It is the state animal of South Australia.

Among the oldest southern hairy-nosed wombats ever documented were a male and a female from Brookfield Zoo just outside Chicago. Their names were Carver, who lived to be 34, and his mother, Vicky, who lived to be 24. In South Australia in 2010, a tame wombat named Wally was also reported as having reached the age of 34. Hamlet, a wombat at the Toronto Zoo, similarly died at age 34.

== Taxonomy ==
English naturalist Richard Owen described the species in 1845. There are three synonyms:

- Phascolomys lasiorhinus Gould, 1863
- Lasiorhinus mcoyi Gray, 1863
- Phascolomys latifrons Owen, 1845

== Description ==
The southern hairy-nosed wombat is adapted to digging; it has a stocky and robust build, flattened claws, and five digits. It is also plantigrade. The body length ranges from 772 to 934 mm (30.4 to 36.8 in) with a body mass ranging from 19 to 32 kg (42 to 71 lb). Its short tail is hidden by its fur. The pelage is silky and is typically greyish or tan in colour. The wombat grooms itself with its second and third toes, which are fused together, except at the tips. The head is robust and flattened and the ears are pointed. The snout resembles that of a pig. The animal gets its name from the hairs that cover its rhinarium. The wombat's incisors resemble those of rodents, and its molars are widely spaced by the palate. The teeth keep growing for the entirety of the animal's life, which is likely an adaptation to its harsh diet. Compared to the common wombat, the southern hairy-nosed wombat has a larger temporalis muscle and a smaller masseter muscle. Also, unlike the northern hairy-nosed wombat, the southern hairy-nosed wombat's nasal bone is longer than the frontal bone.

== Ecology ==
=== Distribution and habitat ===
Southern hairy-nosed wombats range though Western Australia, southern South Australia, and south-western New South Wales. They live in semiarid to arid grasslands and woodlands.

=== Feeding and energy ===
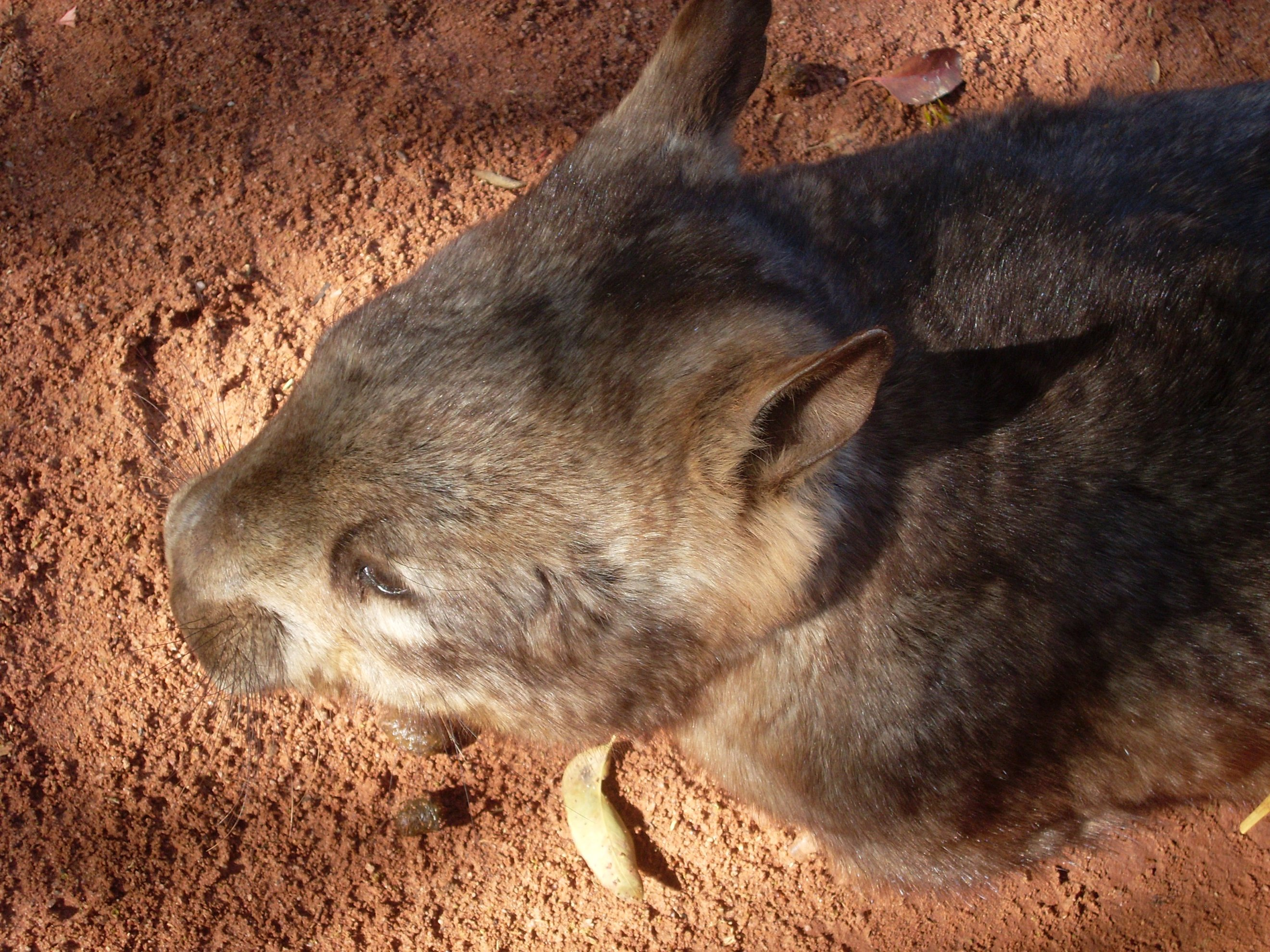
Closeup of wombat lying down

Southern hairy-nosed wombats, along with other wombat species, select native perennial grasses and sedges, but do consume introduced pasture species, forbs, and the leaves of woody shrubs if their favoured food is not available. Much of the southern hairy-nosed wombat's diet is Austrostipa nitida, which grows around its warren complex and is trimmed as it grazes. This creates an area with a higher density of new green shoots, a sign of delayed growth of individual grass. The teeth of the wombat are more effective in grinding food into small particles than the western grey kangaroo. Its digestive tract has a tiny caecum and a colon divided into parts. The anterior part is relatively small and serves as the site for fermentation, while the posterior part is larger and is where water is reabsorbed. The wombat conserves water by recycling more urea to the colon rather than releasing it as urine. Wombats release less than other herbivorous mammals. As such, the southern hairy-nosed wombat produces very dry faeces, with water contents as low as 40%.

Wombats are also host to a diverse gut microbiome, which is thought to help them derive energy and essential nutrients from their relatively poor diets, as well as assist with nitrogen recycling. It has been estimated that the microbial fermentation of fibre in the wombat gut accounts for >60% of the host's daily energy requirements. Recent molecular research has shown that the diversity and composition of these gut microbial communities vary along the gastrointestinal tract, with differences between the proximal and distal colon sites correlating with where the bulk of microbial fermentation occurs. It has also been shown that captivity can drastically impact the diversity and composition of wombat gut microbes, and that different wild populations harbour different gut microbial communities.

The harsh environment in which the southern hairy-nosed wombat lives is further reflected in its energetics. In captivity, their standard metabolic rate was found to be 130 kl/kg^0.75 per day, which is very low compared to most placental animals and other marsupials. They also have the lowest thyroid hormone levels among mammals. The food wombats eat provides more than enough energy. As long as enough food is available, the forage consumed by the wombat can support it during late lactation. It is more effective than a donkey at maintaining its weight on low-quality food.

== Biology ==
=== Burrow system and activities ===
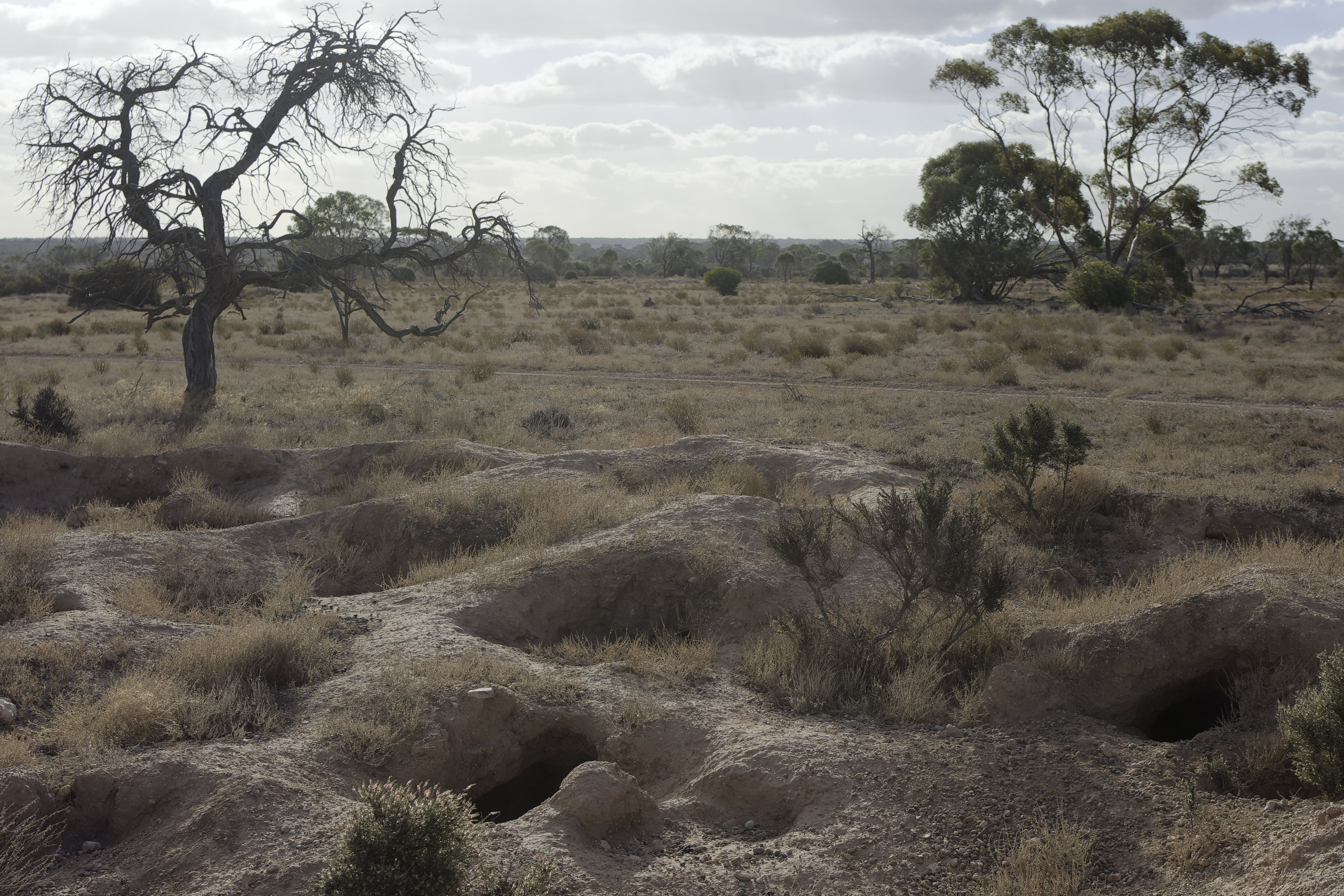
Example wombat warren, with multiple entries visible.

Southern hairy-nosed wombats dig and live in burrows which they connect into warrens with many entrances. These warrens are their prime refuges and are shared by up to 10 individuals. A wombat digs with its fore claws while sitting up. It leaves its new burrow backwards and pushes out soil with all its paws. The central warren is surrounded by a circle of small, simple burrows 100–150 m (330–490 ft) from it. The small burrows along the outer edges is where young wombats go when they are displaced from the central warren. Wombats may favour a certain burrow and not share it with others. However, there is no monopolization of burrows. Wombats move between burrows and even warrens. Male wombats are territorial towards wombats from other warrens, possibly to defend food resources and the warren refuges. Trails of droppings connect the burrows. The males also mark their territory with anal scent secretions by rubbing their backs and rumps on objects. Fights between males over territories or mates do occur and involve bites to the ears, flanks, or rumps. Also, a dominance hierarchy exists among males.

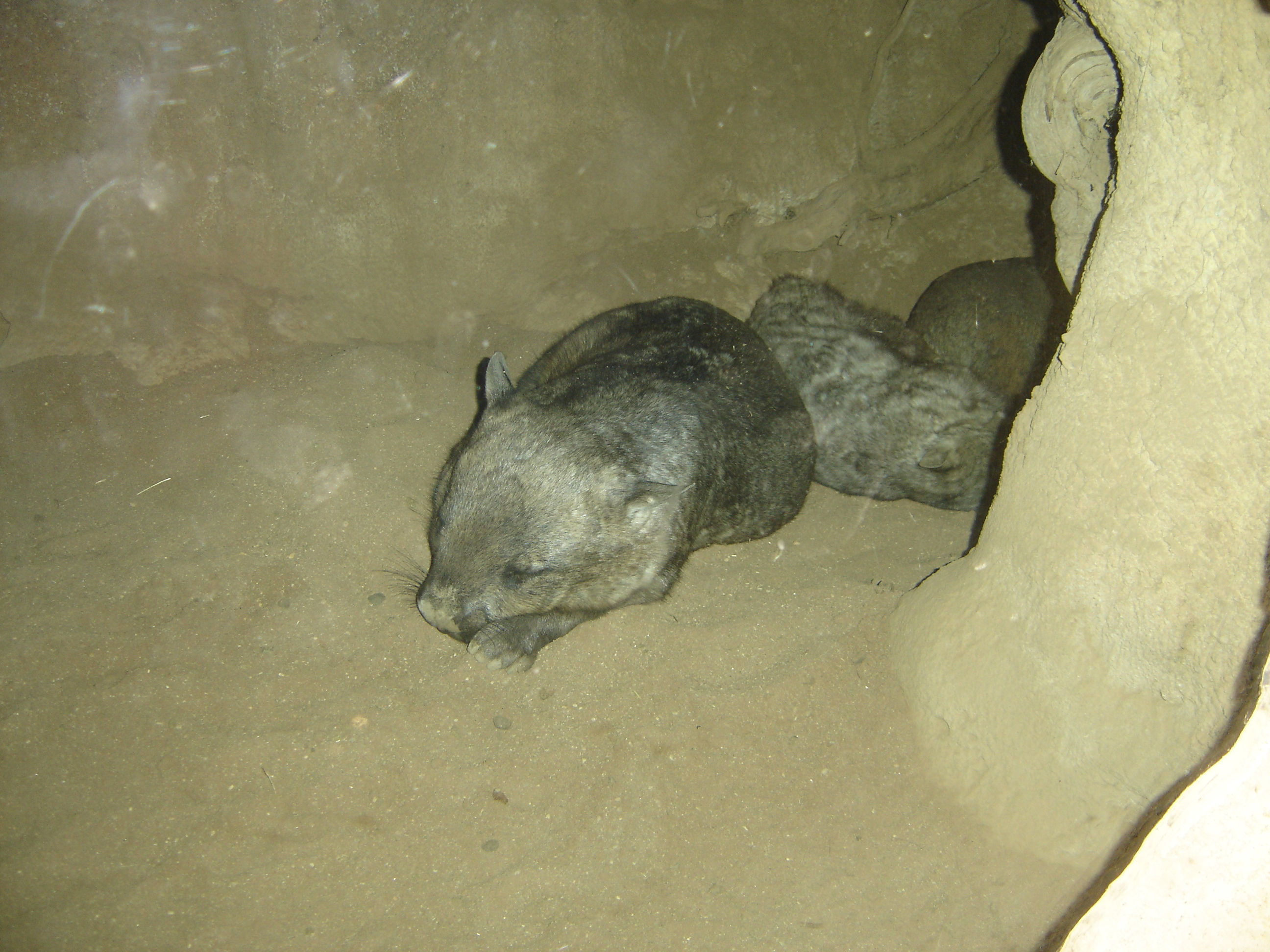
Wombats sleeping in a tunnel at Melbourne Zoo

The burrows of a southern hairy-nosed wombat can have air temperatures around of 14 °C (57 °F) in midwinter to 26 °C (79 °F) in midsummer, the wombat's preferred thermo-neutral zone, while the ambient temperatures outside range from down to around 2 °C (36 °F) in winter and up to 36 °C (97 °F) or above during summer. Warrens can make surface conditions in habitats of low humidity and high temperatures better for the wombat. A wombat retires deep in the burrow after foraging. The next night, the wombat moves to the entrance to check if conditions are right before emerging again. In the evening, wombats leave their burrows as the ambient temperature and burrow temperature are the same. In the early morning, when the surface temperature is lower, they retire.

=== Mating and reproduction ===
The breeding of the southern hairy-nosed wombat occurs when their favoured food is at its peak growth rates. Their reproduction relies on the winter rainfall, which germinates the grasses. Between August and October, when rainfall is sufficient, females enter ovulation and the males' testosterone levels and prostate gland sizes increase. In years of low rainfall, neither occurs. When breeding, dominance hierarchies among males are established through aggression. Copulation takes place in the warren, with males remaining in one burrow and females moving among them. Mating takes place underground and involves the male mounting the female from behind while she is on her side. The gestation period of the wombat lasts 22 days and most births occur in October. When a young is born, it climbs into the pouch and clings to a teat. It stays in the pouch for six months growing to around 0.45 kg (1 lb), with a light pelage and open eyes. It soon leaves the pouch and starts grazing at the surface. The young is fully weaned when it is a year old and reaches full size at the age of three years, which is also when it becomes sexually mature.

The microbiology of the wombat pouch has recently been investigated using molecular approaches. This study found that the diversity and composition of microbes in the pouch correlated to the reproductive status of the host. The diversity of microbes dropped drastically when pouch young were present, or when the mother was reproductively active. One interpretation of this result is that the wombat can filter which microbes are able to live in the pouch through the use of antimicrobial peptides and/or other means. This could be important for the health of the joey, as marsupials are born very early compared to placental mammals and thus lack an adaptive immune system. Further research is also underway to determine whether the pouch microbes that survive host filtering play beneficial roles for the protection and development of the wombat pouch young.

=== Communication ===
Southern hairy-nosed wombats use vocalisations and scents for communication. While most communication between wombats occurs through olfaction and scent-marking, as they do not often encounter each other directly, they emit rough, coughing noises when they pass each other, and emit a more strident call for alarm.

== Conservation status ==
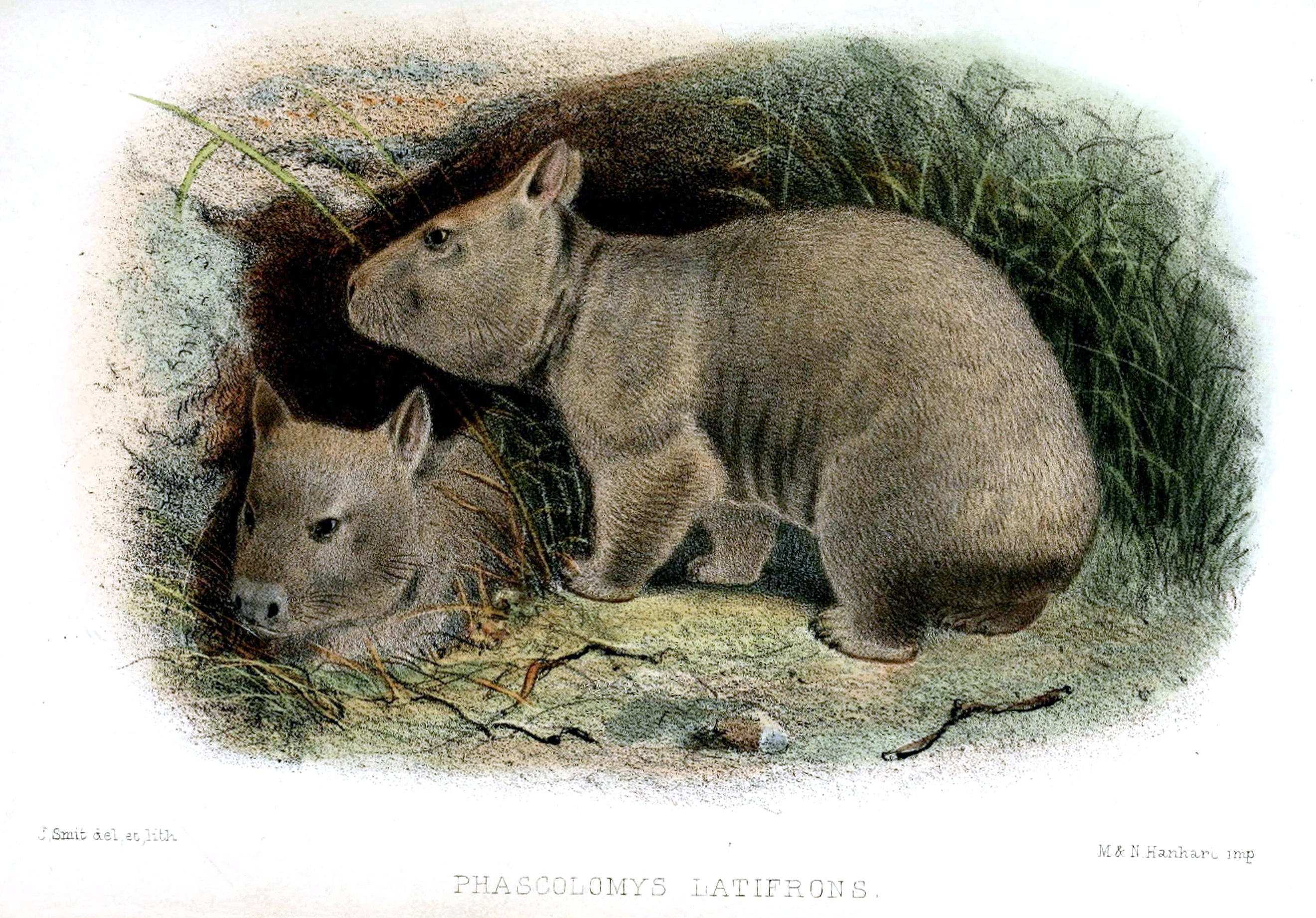
Illustration by Joseph Wolf (1865)

The population of southern hairy-nosed wombats was estimated to be 1.3 million in 2016. The species was listed as Near Threatened by the IUCN in 2016, because "many subpopulations are now isolated and may be non-viable" but has since been updated. Wombats were hunted by aboriginal people for their meat. However, capturing a wombat takes considerable time and energy, so they were not hunted too frequently. The indigenous people of Australia value the wombat culturally and keep their local wombat populations healthy by hunting wombats in other areas.

Wombats have been considered as agricultural pests by landholders. Their digging can destroy crops and can increase the risk of livestock breaking their legs by falling through their burrow systems. Competition between livestock, rabbits, and wombats can lead to overgrazing. Overgrazing and the spread of invasive weeds in some areas has led to the flora being dominated by annual grass and weed species, from which wombats cannot get enough of their metabolic needs, resulting in reports of emaciation and mass starvation. The competition from introduced rabbits threatens the survival of wombats.
