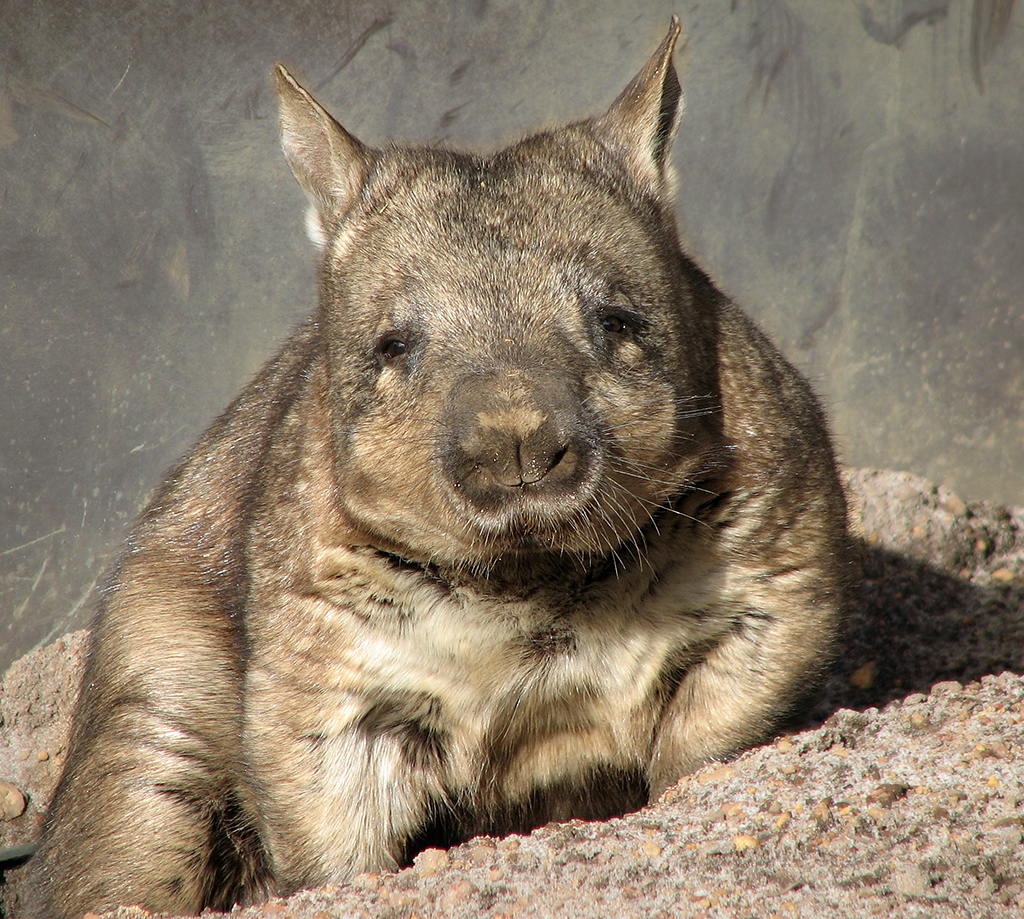
- Southern hairy-nosed wombat

Scientific classification
- Kingdom: Animalia
- Phylum: Chordata
- Class: Mammalia
- Infraclass: Marsupialia
- Order: Diprotodontia
- Family: Vombatidae
- Genus: Lasiorhinus; J. E. Gray, 1863

Type species
- Lasiorhinus mcoyi J. E. Gray, 1863 (= Phascolomys latifrons Owen, 1845)

Species
- See text

= Lasiorhinus =

Genus of marsupials

Lasiorhinus is the genus containing the two extant hairy-nosed wombats, which are found in Australia. The southern hairy-nosed wombat is found in some of the semiarid to arid regions belt from New South Wales southwest to the South Australia-Western Australia border. The IUCN categorises it as Near Threatened. Conversely, the northern hairy-nosed wombat is categorised as Critically Endangered and only survives in a 3-square-kilometre (1.2 sq mi) range within the Epping Forest National Park in Queensland, but formerly also existed in Victoria and New South Wales. There are about 200 or less northern hairy-nosed wombat individuals remaining in the wild today.

== Species ==
The genus includes the following species:

Image	Scientific name	Common name	Distribution
	Lasiorhinus krefftii	Northern hairy-nosed wombat	Queensland
	Lasiorhinus latifrons	Southern hairy-nosed wombat	From the eastern Nullarbor Plain to the New South Wales border area

=== Fossils ===
- †Lasiorhinus angustidens (fossil)
