= Balonne Beacon =

Former newspaper in Queensland, Australia

Balonne Beacon, Saturday 2 January 1909, page 1.

The Balonne Beacon was a newspaper published in St George, Shire of Balonne, Queensland, Australia from 1878 to 2020. It was originally called the St. George Standard and Balonne Advertiser.

== History ==
The first issue of the St. George Standard and Balonne Advertiser appeared on 10 July 1878. A fire destroyed the office and printery on 2 September 1905 and it was replaced by the Balonne Beacon, whose first issue was published on 4 October 1905. The Balonne Beacon also absorbed the Maranoa News on 7 July 1955.

William Norman Dendle and Eva Dendle ran the paper from 1936 to 1971; and it was purchased in October 1971 by Max and Rada Pringle, who ran it for twenty-two years until the end of 1993. It was then sold to Rob and Pam Elkington and finally purchased by APN News & Media, the current proprietors, in mid-1997.

Along with a number of other regional and suburban Australian newspapers owned by NewsCorp, the newspaper ceased publication in June 2020. On 25 June 2020, the Balonne Beacon published its last printed edition with the headline “End of our era - 115 years of serving the Balonne shire” on the front page.

== Digitisation ==
The paper has been digitised as part of the Australian Newspapers Digitisation Program of the National Library of Australia.

== See also ==
- List of newspapers in Australia
