= List of Léon Bernard Foundation Prize recipients =

This is a list of recipients of the Léon Bernard Foundation Prize awarded by World Health Organization (WHO).

Established in 1937 in memory of Professor Léon Bérard (1876–1960), one of the founders of the League of Nations, to celebrate outstanding service in the field of social medicine. The prize is awarded when there is enough funding, consisting of a bronze medal and a sum of 2500 CHF to be awarded to a person who has accomplished it.

== List of recipients ==
Year	Picture	Name	Country
1951		René Sand	Belgium
1952		Charles-Edward Amory Winslow	USA
1953		Johannes Frandsen	Denmark
1954		Jacques Parisot	France
1955		Andrija Štampar	Yugoslavia
1957		Marcin Kacprzak	Poland
1958		Thomas Parran	USA
1962		John Charles	UK
1964		Robert Debré	France
1966		Karl Evang	Norway
1967		Fred Soper	USA
1968		Josef Charvát	Czechoslovakia
1970		Arcot Ramasamy Mudaliar	India
1971		Eugène Aujaleu	France
1972		George Godber	UK
1973		Keizo Nobechi	Japan
1974		Marcolino Gomes Candau	Brazil
1975		Boris Petrovsky	Soviet Union
1976		Vulimiri Ramalingaswami	India
1977		Giovanni A. Canaperia	Italy
1978		Francisco Cambournac	Portugal
1979		Bror Rexed	Sweden
1980		Samual Halter	Belgium
1981		İhsan Doğramacı	Turkey
1982		Ana Aslan	Romania
1984		Mao Shou-pai	China
1985		Raoul Senault	France
1986		Olikoye Ransome-Kuti	Nigeria
1987		John Reid	UK
1988		Meropi Violaki-Paraskeva	Greece
1989		C. Everett Koop	USA
1990		Cosme Ordóñez Carceller	Cuba
1991		Pierre Recht	Belgium
1992		David C. Morley	UK
1993		Fujio Otani	Japan
1994		Donald Acheson	UK
1995		Manuel Elkin Patarroyo	Colombia
1997		Yevgeniy Chazo	Russia
1999		Debbie Emma Choongo	Zambia
2001		Sastri Saowakontha	Thailand
2003		Watanee T. Jentchitr	Thailand
2005		Toregeldy Sharmanov	Kazakhstan
2007		Than Tun Sein	Myanmar
2013		Teng Shuzhong	China
