= List of Jacques Parisot Foundation Fellowship recipients =

This is a list of recipients of the Jacques Parisot Foundation Fellowship awarded by World Health Organization (WHO).

The Foundation was founded in 1969 by Mrs Parisot in honour of Professor Jacques Parisot (1882–1967), who was a founding member of WHO and signed the Organization's Constitution on behalf of France at the 1946 International Health Conference in New York. The Foundation's goal is to promote social medicine or public health research by providing fellowships, which are given out every two years (even years). A bronze medal and a value of US$5,000 make up the prize. It was discontinued in 2015.

== List of recipients ==
Year	Name	Country
1977	M. H. Wahdan	Egypt
1978	M. F. Bonifacio	Philippines
1980	Kenneth Livingstone Standard	Jamaica
1983	Yayehyirad Kitaw	Ethiopia
1984	Anant Menaruchi	Thailand
1986	Pamela Enderby	UK
1988	Yacoub Y. Al Mazroue	Saudi Arabia
1991	Zheng Qingsi	China
1992	María Soledad Larraín	Chile
1994	Alfred Ole Sulul	Tanzania
1996	K.A.K.K. Wijewardene	Sri Lanka
1998	Boinikum Benson Konlaan	Sweden
2000	Laura Papantoniou	Cyprus
2002	Yu Dongbao	China
2005	Alok Kumar	Barbados
2009	Livesy Abokyi Naaffoe	Ghana
