= Samba Ousemane Sow =

Malian physician

- Born: July 2, 1964 (age 62); Bamako
- Education: École de médecine de l'AOF; London School of Hygiene & Tropical Medicine
- Scientific career
- Workplaces: General of the Centre pour les Vaccins en Développement; World Health Organization

Samba Ousemane Sow (born July 2, 1964) is a Malian physician who is Director General of the Centre pour les Vaccins en Développement and adjunct professor of medicine at the University of Maryland School of Medicine. He has been involved with Mali's public health effort against ebola, COVID-19 and leprosy. In 2021 he was elected an International Fellow of the National Academy of Medicine.

== Early life and education ==
Sow was born in Bamako. Sow earned a bachelor's degree in science at the Lycée Askia-Mohamed. He moved to the École de médecine de l'AOF for medical studies. He was a postgraduate student at the London School of Hygiene & Tropical Medicine.

== Research and career ==
Sow has been involved with public health programs and the development of vaccines for people in Mali. He was appointed Minister of Health and Public Hygiene in Mali in 2017. He was responsible for reforming the healthcare system in Mali. He worked on child and maternal health. Sow served as the coordinator of the World Health Organization Multi-center Field Trial on Leprosy Chemotherapy. He holds a joint position at the University of Maryland, Baltimore County.

Sow was involved in the leadership team on controlling the spread of Ebola and COVID-19. In February 2020, Sow was named as one of the World Health Organization's special envoys on COVID-19. At the time, several countries in Africa were identified as at risk because of their high volume of travel with China. He was also appointed to The Lancet COVID-19 commission.

== Awards and honors ==
- 2000 Aix-Marseille University Laviron Prize in Tropical Medicine
- 2006 American Society of Tropical Medicine and Hygiene Commemorative Lecturer
- 2014 Elected Honorary Fellow of the American Society of Tropical Medicine and Hygiene
- 2017 Appointed Chevalier de la Légion d'honneur
- 2017 World Health Organization ROUX Prize
- 2021 Elected Fellow of the National Academy of Medicine
