= Comlan A. A. Quenum =

Beninois physician and diplomat (1926–1984)

- Born: 10 January 1926; Ouidah, Benin
- Died: 15 August 1984 (aged 58); Brazzaville, Congo
- Awards: National Order of the Ivory Coast; Order of the Equatorial Star, National Order of Merit (Senegal); National Order of Benin; Order of Merit (Congo)

Academic background
- Education: École de médecine de l'AOF (Diploma); University of Bordeaux (MBBS, MD)
- Website: YouTube Channel

Comlan Alfred Auguste Quenum (10 January 1926 – 15 August 1984) was a Beninois physician, diplomat, and official. He was the first African to serve as the Regional Director for Africa for the World Health Organization (WHO). The Government of Cameroon established the Dr Comlan A.A. Quenum Prize for Public Health in 1987 in his memory.

== Life and career ==
=== Early life and education ===
Comlan Alfred Auguste Quenum was born on 10 January 1926 in Ouidah, Benin.

Quenum obtained a Diploma from the École de médecine de l'AOF in Dakar, Senegal (1948-1952), a Bachelor of Medicine from the University of Bordeaux (1954–1955), and a Doctor of Medicine from the Medical Faculty at the University of Bordeaux (1954–1957). He also earned several certificates, including Zoology (1958), Biology (1959), and Animal Physiology (1960), and became an Agrégé in Histology and Embryology in 1962.

=== Career ===
Quenum was the Chief Physician at the Infirmary in Senegal from 1953 to 1954. In addition, Quenum also served as the Chief of Histology Study at the Joint Faculty of Medicine and Pharmacy in Dakar, Senegal, from 1959, and as a professor of Embryology and Histology at the Faculty of Medicine and Pharmacy in Dakar from 1959 to 1963. Quenum also served as a professor at the Joint Faculty of Medicine and Pharmacy at the University of Dakar in 1963–1964.

Quenum was an active member of the World Health Organization (WHO) Expert Committee on Professional & Technical Education of Medicine and Auxiliary Personnel from 1964 to 1965. This committee played an essential role in formulating guidelines for training healthcare professionals in Africa. He then became the Regional Director for Africa at the WHO from 1965. He was also the first African to hold this position and the second African to become a Regional Director after Aly Tewfik Shousha, who was the Regional Director of the Eastern Mediterranean Region since the WHO inception on 1 July 1949.

Quenum, until his sudden death, played a crucial role in the implementation of various health programs across Africa. As the Regional Director for Africa at the WHO, he had to engage with various governments and organizations to promote public health policies including tabaco, smallpox, onchocerciasis, AIDS, and chemotherapy.

Quenum was one of the 124 founders of the World Cultural Council in 1981.

Quenum died on 15 August 1984 in Brazzaville, Congo.

== Awards and honours ==
Quenum was also recognized for his diplomatic work, having received honors such as the Commander of the National Order of the Republic from Ivory Coast, the Order of the Equatorial Star from Gabon, and the Order of Merit of Congo, Senegal, and Benin. He was awarded honorary doctorates from the University of Abidjan in the Ivory Coast and the National University of Zaire as well.

After his death, the Government of Cameroon established the Dr Comlan A.A. Quenum Prize for Public Health in 1987 in his memory. This prize is awarded by the WHO to recognize individuals or organizations that have made significant contributions to public health in Africa. The prize was awarded every two years until it was discontinued in 2000.
