= Instituto Nacional de Saúde Dr. Ricardo Jorge =

Portuguese research institute

Coordinates: 38.7643785°N 9.1641535°W

The Instituto Nacional de Saúde Dr. Ricardo Jorge (INSA) (English: National Institute of Health Dr. Ricardo Jorge) is a public institution under the Portuguese Ministry of Health, with self scientific, technical, administrative, and financial autonomy.

== History ==
Founded in 1899 by physician and humanist Ricardo Jorge (Porto, 1858 - Lisbon, 1939), as a research institution of the Portuguese health system, the INSA has a threefold mission of laboratory in health issues, national reference laboratory and national observatory of health.

During the Estado Novo regime, this body was designated the Instituto Superior de Higiene Dr. Ricardo Jorge. Pursuant to Decree-Law no. 35,108 of 1945, the Institute was reclassified as a special body for health and welfare, endowed with technical and administrative autonomy, and authorized to receive subsidies as well as to accept inheritances, bequests, or donations. Likewise, its administration could be entrusted to welfare institutions of either a secular or religious character.

== Organization ==
The INSA has operating units in its headquarters in Lisbon, Porto (in two centers: Center for Public Health Doctor Gonçalves Ferreira and Center for Medical Genetics Jacinto Magalhães) and Águas de Moura (Center for Studies on Vectors and Infectious Diseases Dr. Francisco Cambournac).

The INSA is organized in six major departments:

- Department of Food and Nutrition;
- Department of Infectious Diseases;
- Department of Epidemiology;
- Department of Genetics;
- Department of Health Promotion and Chronic Diseases;
- Department of Environmental Health

== Past and present staff ==
- Laura Ayres
