= Waitzkin =

Waitzkin is a surname. Notable people with the surname include:

- Fred Waitzkin (born 1943), American novelist and writer, father of Josh (see below)
- Howard Waitzkin (born 1945), sociologist
- Joshua Waitzkin (born 1976), American chess player, martial arts competitor, and author, son of Fred (see above)
- Stella Waitzkin (1920–2003), American installation artist
