= Marcin Kacprzak =

Polish physician

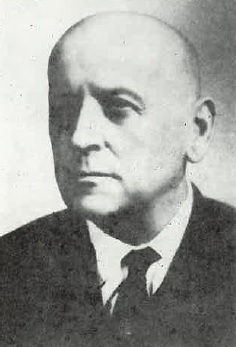
- Born: 6 November 1888; Podolszyce, Poland
- Died: 14 July 1968 (aged 79); Warsaw
- Resting place: Powązki Military Cemetery
- Education: Sorbonne University (1914); National University of Kharkiv (1915); Johns Hopkins University (1924)
- Awards: Léon Bernard Foundation Prize (1957); Order of the Banner of Work (1st Class 1955); Order of Polonia Restituta (Commander 1951, Officer 1946, Knight 1933)
- Scientific career
- Workplaces: Rockefeller Foundation; Free Polish University; University of Łódź; WHO

Marcin Kacprzak (6 November 1888, Podolszyce - 14 July 1968, Warsaw) was a doctor, educator, pedagogue, publicist, pioneer of social medicine in Poland.

== Early life and education ==
Marcin Kacprzak was born on 6 November 1888 in Podolszyce. In 1894, he began his education at the primary school in Lelice, from which he was expelled in 1905 for participating in school protests. In 1906, he began studying at the newly opened municipal gymnasium, which he graduated from in 1908.

He studied medicine from 1908 to 1914 at the Sorbonne University in Paris. He received his medical diploma in 1915 at the National University of Kharkiv, then he worked as a doctor in the Pskov oblast. In 1921, he started working as a sanitary doctor in Warsaw. In 1922–1924, he studied hygiene and health care organisation at Johns Hopkins University in Baltimore on a Rockefeller Foundation scholarship. He received the degree of doctor of medical sciences in 1928 in Kraków. From then on, he became permanently involved with public health, social medicine, and epidemiology.

== Career ==
In the 1930s he was the head of a department in the Ministry of Social Welfare. He lectured on hygiene at the Free Polish University in Warsaw. From 1945, he was a professor at the University of Łódź, and from 1947, as a full professor, he headed the Department of Hygiene at the Medical University of Warsaw, of which he was the rector in the years 1955-1962. In the years 1953–1954, he was the director of the newly established Institute of Improvement and Specialisation of Medical Personnel in Warsaw. He studied the health of the inhabitants of the Polish countryside, especially in Mazovia.

After World War II, he led to the reactivation of the Polish Hygienic Society, of which he was the president until the end of his life. From 1951 a corresponding member of the Warsaw Scientific Society, from 1962 a corresponding member of the Polish Academy of Arts and Sciences.

He held many functions in foreign and domestic organizations. After World War II, he was a co-organizer of the World Health Organization (WHO). He was one of the first to receive in 1957, at the Palace of Nations in Geneva, the Prize of Leon Bernard Award, the WHO's highest award.

From 1961, he was a member of the USSR Academy of Medical Sciences, and from 1962, a corresponding member of the Polish Academy of Sciences, where he chaired the Hygiene Committee. He was an honorary member of the Płock Scientific Society. In 1964 he received the title of Honorary Citizen of the City of Płock.

Marcin Kacprzak is the patron of the Provincial Hospital in Płock.

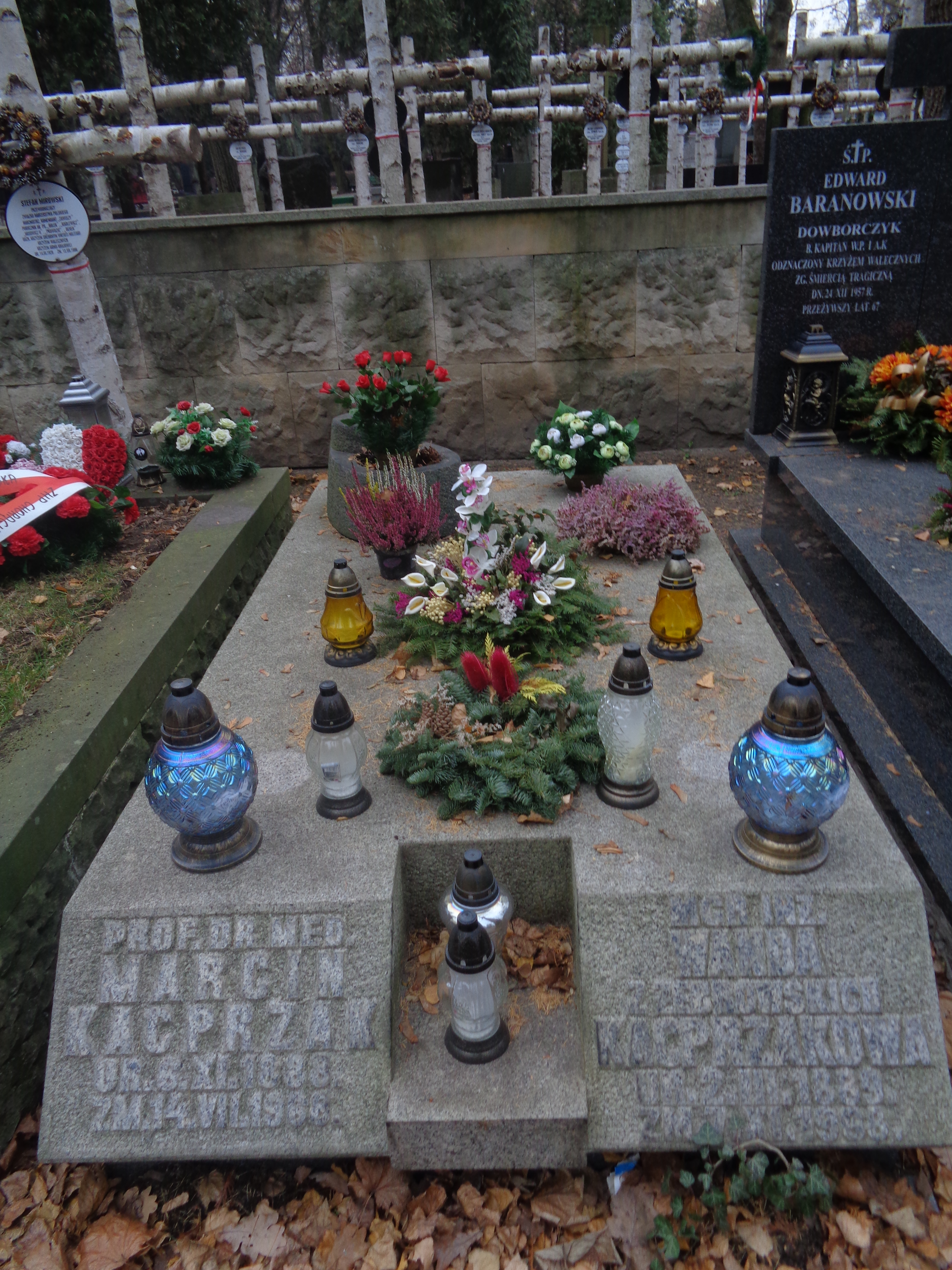
Kacprzak's grave at the Powązki Military Cemetery

He died in Warsaw and was buried at the Powązki Military Cemetery (section A20-1-7).

== Awards and honours ==
- Léon Bernard Foundation Prize (1957)
- Order of the Banner of Work, 1st class (July 19, 1955)
- Commander's Cross of the Order of Polonia Restituta (July 22, 1951)
- Officer's Cross of the Order of Polonia Restituta (July 19, 1946)
- Knight's Cross of the Order of Polonia Restituta (November 10, 1933)

== Main works ==
- The village of Płock (1937)
- The state of medical care for the rural population (1937)
- Tuberculosis in the Countryside (1938)
- General Epidemiology (1956)
