= Jacques Parisot =

French physician (1882-1967)

- Born: 15 June 1882; Nancy, France
- Died: 7 October 1967 (aged 85); Nancy, France
- Awards: Commander of the Ordre des Palmes académiques Grand Cross of the Legion of Honor; Léon Bernard Foundation Prize
- Scientific career
- Fields: Social medicine Hygiene; Preventive medicine Drug rehabilitation
- Workplaces: Office of Social Hygiene; World Health Organization; World Health Assembly; League of Nations; 10th Army (France); 8th Army (France)
- Thesis: Blood pressure and glands with internal secretion (1907)

Jacques Parisot (English: /pærɪˈzoʊ/ par-ih-ZOH, French: [ʒak paʁizo]; 15 June 1882 – 7 October 1967) was a French doctor, who is considered one of the initiators of health and social medicine as it is conceived today, and one of the founders of World Health Organization (WHO).

Parisot came from a family of doctors and medical professionals. He achieved many distinctions in his early career, including several prizes for his research in endocrinology. During World War I, he served as a battalion doctor and was eventually promoted to doctor-consultant of the 10th army. He was recognised for his bravery and dedication, and received several awards, including the Legion of Honour.

After the war, Parisot turned his attention to preventive medicine and social action. He campaigned for the dangers of chemical warfare to be considered and was eventually appointed as a medical consultant of the 8th Army during World War II. He joined the Resistance, but was eventually captured and sent to a Neuengamme concentration camp. After the war, he continued his academic career and became the dean of the Faculty of Medicine in Nancy. Parisot campaigned for the social background of diseases, emphasizing the importance of prevention and social action. The Jacques Parisot Foundation Fellowship was awarded in his honour.

== Early career ==
Jacques Parisot was born on 15 June 1882 in Nancy, France to a family of a doctor. His grandfather, Victor Parisot, held the chair of the internal clinic; his great-uncle, Léon Parisot, holder of the chair of anatomy and physiology; his father, Pierre Parisot, renowned forensic doctor; his uncle, Albert Heydenreich, surgeon and dean of the Faculty of medicine. Parisot followed in their footstep as he won the Physiology Prize in 1902, Medicine Prize in 1903, and the Boarding School Prize and Bénit Prize in 1906. In 1906, he was appointed head of the clinic; in 1907, he defended his thesis, Blood pressure and glands with internal secretion, for which he received the thesis prize of the faculty and the Bourceret prize of the National Academy of Medicine.

Parisot married Marcelle Michaut in 1907, whose family was part of the Baccarat crystals. He obtained the aggregation of general medicine in 1913, when he had many publications to his credit, especially in the field of endocrinology, which was still underdeveloped. The same year, he took charge of the tuberculosis of the Villemin Hospital in Nancy. More accustomed to laboratory work, Parisot Parisot became aware of the social background of diseases.

== Military career ==
But from the early 1920s, Parisot give up basic research for preventive medicine and the social action it is oriented.

Mobilised in 1914, he left as a battalion doctor, attached to the 269th infantry regiment. He progressed in the hierarchy in less than a year, assistant doctor and then major. He showed "his bravery and [...] his composure, [...] his innate sense of command and organisation, but also [...] his deeply human qualities of dedication to the wounded". In July 1915, he received a new assignment, in a front ambulance and he has been proposed three times for the Legion of Honour (9 November 1914 for "beautiful driving in Lorraine and during the fighting of Izel-Les-Equerchin and Douai", renewed in January and March 1915). This award was finally given to him in April 1916.

During the rest of the conflict, he worked on medical pathologies (freezing, nephritis). Assigned to Ambulance Z, responsible for caring for gassed soldiers to the point of being hospitalized, and he published many notes on the effects of combat gases. When the Armistice occurs, he was appointed doctor-consultant of the 10th army led by the General Mangin, a position in which he was faced with the risk of the epidemic typhus and Spanish flu.

On 16 March 1921, he became an Officer of the Legion of Honor. In the interwar period, he campaigned for the dangers of the chemical war to be considered. He became a join the board of directors of the French Red Cross. In 1933, he was promoted to the rank of Commander of the Legion of Honor.

Then the Second World War broke out. On 3 September 1939, he was appointed medical consultant of the 8th Army. While he is based in Alsace, he was taken prisoner at Saint-Dié-des-Vosges, where he catches severe dysentery, which led him to be declared unfit for any service. He was then sent back to his homes with the War Cross 39-45, decorated with a quote.

Parisot then joined the Resistance but was soon discovered. Alerted, he organised his escape, but worried about the consequences that his disappearance could have for his relatives and students, he gave himself, on 4 June 1944 at 4 a.m., to the Germans who came to arrest him. Questioned by the Gestapo, he wad sent to the Royallieu camp, then to the Neuengamme concentration camp. On 12 April 1945, he was part of a group of 360 prisoners who were far from the camp, and who, having arrived in Prague, discovered the collapse of the SS. He did not return to Lorraine until more than a month later, on 18 May 1945. The Minister of War immediately proposes him to be elevated to the dignity of Grand Officer of the Legion of Honor, a decoration given to him by the General Jean de Lattre de Tassigny in Nancy.

== Academic career ==
At the end of the First World War, he agreed to teach general and experimental pathology at the Nancy Faculty of Medicine. In 1927, he obtained the chair of hygiene and preventive medicine. In 1949, he was unanimously appointed dean of the Faculty of Medicine, a position he held until 1955 when he retired.

Convinced of the importance of acting on the social context to promote the treatment of certain diseases and in particular tuberculosis, which is the initial target, he actively participated in the creation, in 1920, of the Office of Social Hygiene of Meurthe-et-Moselle (OHS). The objective of this structure is to detect and prevent diseases, thanks, in particular, to a network of dispensaries that covers the department. Virtually all dispensaries are installed next to or within local hospitals, whose infrastructure they can use; they are directed by a chief physician, assisted by "visiting nurses", who benefit from a special status, an innovation in the profession: they constitute a first model on which the profession of the social worker. Serious cases are sent to the Villemin central dispensary, which acts as a sorting platform and ensures their distribution between the Villemin hospital-sanatorium, the Lay-Saint-Christophe sanatorium and the Flavigny preventorium.

The development of the OHS continued throughout the 1920s, with the support of local partners, legacies of individuals, but also, in 1921, the Rockefeller Foundation, of which a member regrets, in a 1939 report, that the Lorraine example was not further used in France. Gradually, other pathologies are taken care of: syphilis, alcoholism, infant mortality, cancer: the approach now consists in engaging "a real policy of public health thought on a territorial scale". Under its influence, Meurthe-et-Moselle is clearly at the forefront, the first department to apply legislation on social insurance; he campaigned, from the early 1930s, for the establishment of preventive medicine services and mutual insurance for students.

OHS is also innovating in terms of communication, developing campaigns of vaccination — anti-tuberculosis stamp, BCG,etc. - and using the media: leaflets, posters, cinema are mobilised to disseminate prevention messages to the general public, in addition to the scientific communication provided by the journal created at the initiative of Jacques Parisot, the Review of Hygiene and Social Prophylaxis, which was published from 1922 to 1939.

In 1942, he created the Commission for the Reclassification of Physical Decreases, having had the opportunity, during missions carried out as part of the International Labour Office, sequelae related to occupational accidents and disabling diseases. In particular, he met Henri Poulizac, a consulting doctor. In 1951, it was again with him that he created a tripartite commission that brought together the Faculty of Medicine, the Regional Social Security Fund and the Regional Hospital Center, to study the opportunity to develop a traumatology. This project, discussed, finally led, on 28 November 1952, to the idea of an Institute for Social and Vocational Rehabilitation of the physically disabled. On 27 April 1953, the tripartite agreement creating the Rehabilitation Institute - which became in 1957 the Regional Institute of functional, professional and social rehabilitation of the northeast - is signed. Professor Louis Pierquin is the director, and Dr. Henri Poulizac is the technical director. He is quoted, with Robert Buron, Alfred Rosier, Eugène Aujaleu, André Trannoy, Suzanne Fouché and Robert Debré, as one of the seven key people in the development of physical medicine and rehabilitation in France.

The results obtained earned him national and international recognition. Interested in the work of the Organisation for Hygiene of the League of Nations, he became a member of the French delegation in 1929, then, in 1937, took over the head of the organisation. This naturally led him to participate, in 1945-1946, in the creation of the World Health Organization (he is, for France, the signatory to the constitution of the organisation). In 1951, he was elected President of the WHO Executive Council, then, in 1956, of the World Health Assembly.

He was elevated to the ultimate dignity of Grand Cross of the Legion of Honor on 3 March 1953, and awarded the Léon Bernard Foundation Prize in 1954.

Parisot have contributed to the implementation of the National Institute of Health and Medical Research (Inserm) in 1963 - an organisation he chaired for a few years - but also the French National Research and Safety Institute for the Prevention of Occupational Accidents and Diseases (INRS).

== Death and legacy ==
Parisot died on 7 October 1967 in Nancy.

His career earned him to be elevated to the dignity of Commander of the Ordre des Palmes académiques. Among the interventions presented on 14 February 1968, on the occasion of the solemn ceremony in memory of Jacques Parisot, in the Grand Amphitheatre of the Sorbonne, that of the general practitioner Raymond Debenedetti, member of the National Academy of Medicine and then President of the French Red Cross, entitled The Patriot, traces the journey of a courageous and patriotic soldier during the two conflicts of the 20th century. This section is written in particular from this text.

In 1969, his widow created the Jacques Parisot Foundation, which awarded a fellowship, on the proposal of the WHO regional committees. The awarding of the scholarship and a medal takes place at the World Health Assembly. However, the award was discontinued in 2015.

== Selected publications ==
- Jacques Parisot, Endocrine glands and their functional value; exploration and diagnostic methods, G. Doin, 1923
- Jacques Parisot, Healing is good, preventing is better: The effort made in social hygiene and medicine in the department of Meurthe-et-Moselle, Éditions de la "Revue d'hygiène et de prophylaxis sociales", 1925
- Jacques Parisot and Pierre Simonin, Vaccines and the practice of vaccine therapy, Maloine, 1925
- Jacques Parisot, The organization of the tuberculosis control in the departmental framework. Its realization in Meurthe-et-Moselle, Berger Levrault, 1928
- Jacques Parisot and A. Ardisson, Protection against Aerochemical Danger, Military Injured Relief Society, 1932
- Jacques Parisot, The development of hygiene in France: General overview, Impr. G. Thomas, 1933
- Jacques Parisot, The national equipment project and social insurance, Berger-Levault, 1934
- Jacques Parisot, Training for health education, Health Education Journal, 1958
