= Francisco Cambournac =

Portuguese physician (1903–1994)

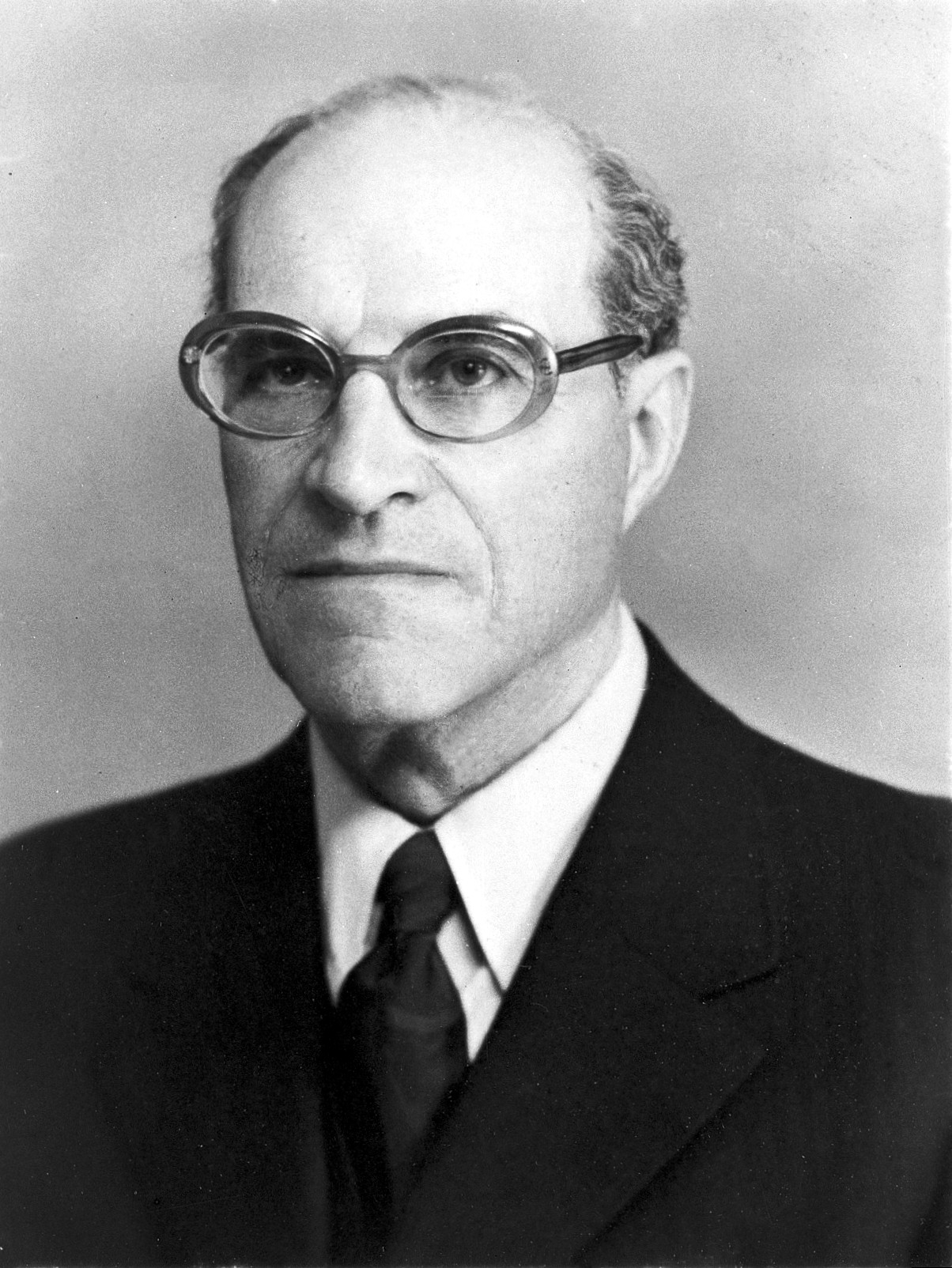
- Born: 26 December 1903; Rio de Mouro
- Died: 8 June 1994 (aged 90); Lisbon
- Education: University of Lisbon
- Awards: Léon Bernard Foundation Prize (1978)
- Scientific career
- Fields: Malariology
- Workplaces: World Health Organization; Rockefeller Foundation

Francisco Cambournac (26 December 1903 – 8 June 1994) was a notable Portuguese doctor. He came to the fore in the field of Malariology, a subject that contributed greatly to Portuguese medicine. He won the Léon Bernard Foundation Prize in 1978.

== Biography ==
Cambournac was born on 26 of December 1903 in Rio de Mouro, Portugal and was educated at the University of Lisbon and graduated in 1929. He then specialised in tropical medicine, hygiene, and malaria between 1934 and 1943 while joining missions that examined health care in Portuguese colonies.

Cambournac was made a professor of hygiene at the Tropical Medicine Institute, Lisbon in 1946. He served as the regional director of the World Health Organization’s African Regional Office between 1954 and 1964 working on malaria research before continuing his work at Rockefeller Foundation. He won the Léon Bernard Foundation Prize in 1978 for outstanding service in the field of social medicine.

Cambournac died on 8 June 1994 in Lisbon.
