= Laura Ayres =

Portuguese virologist and head of National Programme to combat AIDS

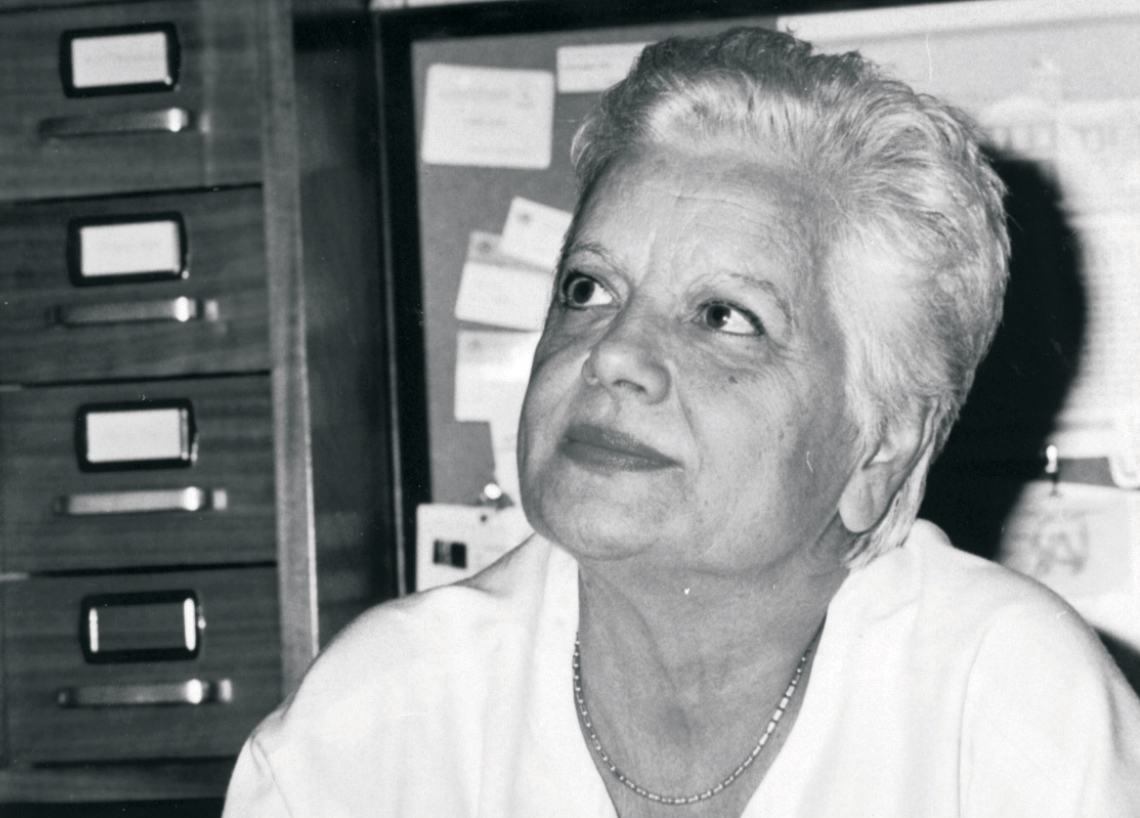
- Born: Laura Guilhermina Martins Ayres; 1 June 1922; Loulé, Portugal
- Died: 16 January 1992 (aged 69); Lisbon, Portugal
- Occupation: Virologist
- Years active: 46
- Known for: Establishment of Portugal’s first Virology laboratory; Establishment of Portuguese National Programme for the fight against AIDS

Laura Ayres (1 June 1922 – 16 January 1992) was a virologist who was one of Portugal's pioneers in the fight against AIDS.

== Early training ==
Laura Guilhermina Martins Ayres was born on 1 June 1922 in Loulé in the Faro District of Portugal. She graduated in Medicine in 1946. It was during her subsequent internships in hospitals that she became interested in the study of communicable diseases. After her hospital training, she did an internship between 1950 and 1953 in Lisbon at the Instituto Superior de Higiene (ISH), the former designation of the Instituto Nacional de Saúde Dr. Ricardo Jorge (Portuguese National Institute of Health - INSA). There she carried out studies on the influenza virus and other respiratory pathologies, including setting up a unit for the diagnosis of whooping cough. She then carried out studies on virology in England before returning to the ISH in 1955 to work as a virologist.

== Virology ==
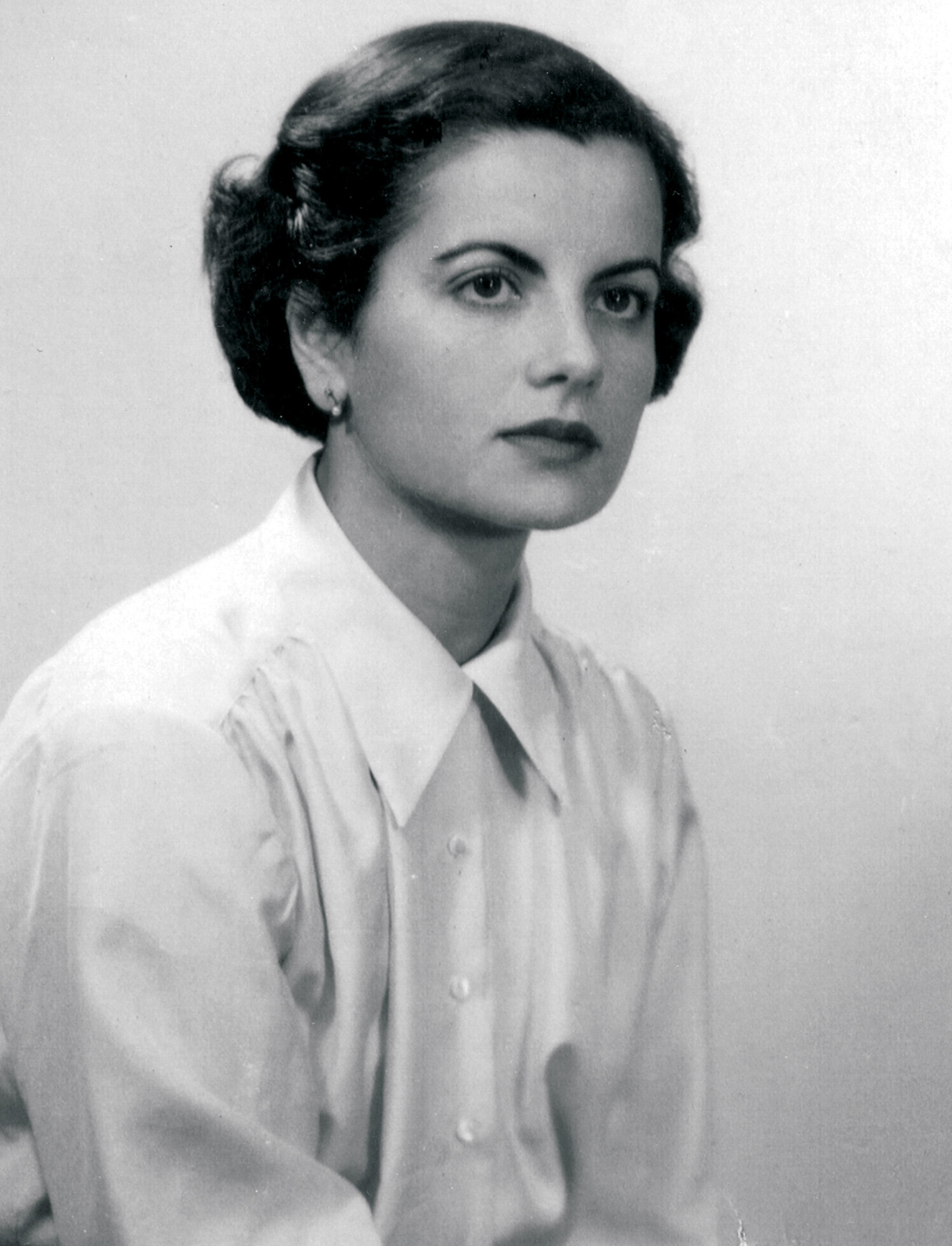
Laura Ayres

At that time knowledge of virology was practically non-existent in Portugal, and there was a great urgency for a capacity to study viral diseases to be developed at ISH. Ayres developed the Institute's virology laboratory and in 1985 also developed an Epidemiological Surveillance Centre for Communicable Diseases. She also coordinated Portugal's first National Serological Survey to determine the prevalence of diseases in the country. Ayres also carried out research into trachoma.

== Work on AIDS ==
From 1983 Ayres was Deputy Director of INSA. She also set up the Portuguese National Programme for the fight against AIDS as well as the AIDS Reference Laboratory at INSA, one of the first Portuguese institutions to develop the capacity to diagnose HIV infections.

== Awards ==
In 1990, in acknowledgment of her work, she was made an Officer of the Military Order of Saint James of the Sword (Portuguese: Ordem Militar de Sant'Iago da Espada), a Portuguese national award conferred for outstanding achievements in science, literature or art. Following her death in Lisbon on 16 January 1992 she was made a Grand Officer of the same award. She received the Ricardo Jorge Prize for her work on trachoma. The INSA Virology Centre is named after her, as is the Regional Public Health Laboratory of the Algarve. A school complex in Quarteira in Loulé also bears her name.
