= Josef Charvát =

Czech academic and medical doctor (1897–1984)

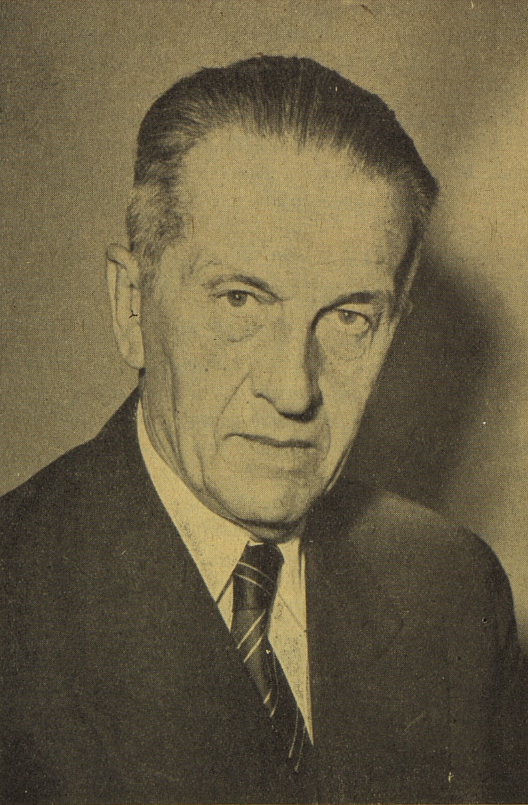
- Born: 6 August 1897; Královské Vinohrady, Bohemia, Austria-Hungary
- Died: 31 January 1984 (aged 86); Prague, Czechoslovakia
- Resting place: Olšany Cemetery
- Education: Faculty of Medicine, Charles University
- Awards: Léon Bernard Foundation Prize (1968); Order of Labour; Klement Gottwald State Prize; Order of the Yugoslav Star; Order of the Republic; Order of the Hero of Socialist Labour
- Scientific career
- Workplaces: Charles University

Josef Charvát (6 August 1897 – 31 January 1984) was a Czech medical doctor and endocrinologist. He played a significant role in the development of Czech endocrinology. Charvát graduated from the grammar school with honours before studying at Charles University. After World War I, he founded the 9th old scout troop and became a leader in the Union of Scouts. During World War II, Charvát was arrested by the Gestapo for resistance activity and imprisoned in several concentration camps. After the war, he founded the internal clinic at Charles University and became its head until 1970. Charvát was the founder of Czech endocrinology and also made contributions in the fields of stress, immunology, and medical cybernetics.

Throughout his career, Charvát treated several important personalities, including politicians, artists, and prominent individuals. He also received numerous awards and was a member of the Advisory Board for Science and Technology in the United Nations.

== Early life and education ==
Josef Charvát was born on 6 August 1897 in Královské Vinohrady in Bohemia, Austria-Hungary (now the Vinohrady district of Prague, Czech Republic), into a low-income family of a trained blacksmith and locksmith, an employee of Elektrické podnikých in Prague. In 1912, he joined the Kamzík scout troop, which he later led and with which he founded the 2nd Prague Scout Troop.

He graduated from the grammar school in Prague with honours in 1916. He began studying at the medical faculty of Charles University, but in 1916 he had to interrupt his studies and enlist in the artillery. He later fought on three different fronts of World War I.

== Career ==
After returning from the front, he founded the 9th old scout troop, one of the first troops for adult scouts. In 1922, he was elected to the leadership of the Union of Scouts, then in 1932 as its deputy mayor, and after the departure of Edvard Beneš from the position of mayor in 1935, he performed this function until the merger with Junák, when he retired from active service and was elected honorary commander.

He graduated only in 1923. He wanted to study psychiatry but could not find a position in this field in Prague. He joined WWII as an internal clinic, where he began to focus on biochemistry and endocrinology. A year later, he published his habilitation thesis in the field of endocrinology on the effect of insulin.

Later he studied in France and England. In 1935, he was offered the position of professor of internal medicine, but his appointment did not occur until 1946. He was the initiator of the Czechoslovak Endocrinological Society and was its first chairman (except for 1949 – 1951) until 1973.

=== Concentration camp ===
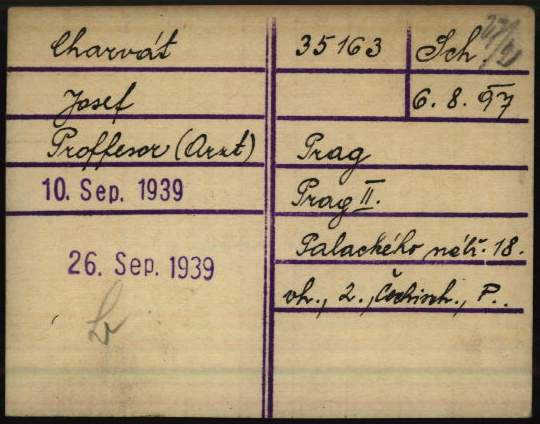
Registration card of Josef Charvát as a prisoner in the Dachau concentration camp

On 1 September 1939, he was arrested by the Gestapo for resistance activity and imprisoned in Pankrác prison and the Dachau and Buchenwald concentration camps. For a long time it was believed that the then Swedish Crown Prince Gustav VI was responsible for his release, others alleged direct intervention from Hitler under advice from Gustav Adolf. Charvát knew Gustav Adolf from the Moot scout meeting in Sweden in 1937. Still, this expedient story was refuted by the investigation of the Australian journalist WH Burke, summarized in a book entitled Čtyřiatřicet. Albert Göring arranged the release, the younger (and most likely half) brother of prominent Nazi Hermann Göring, an engineer and appointed director of Škoda Works, whom Charvát had known since the pre-war period. Göring used his surname not only to release Professor Charvát but also to help 33 other people, important and ordinary. After the war, he was cleared by the Nuremberg and Czech courts.

=== After World War II ===
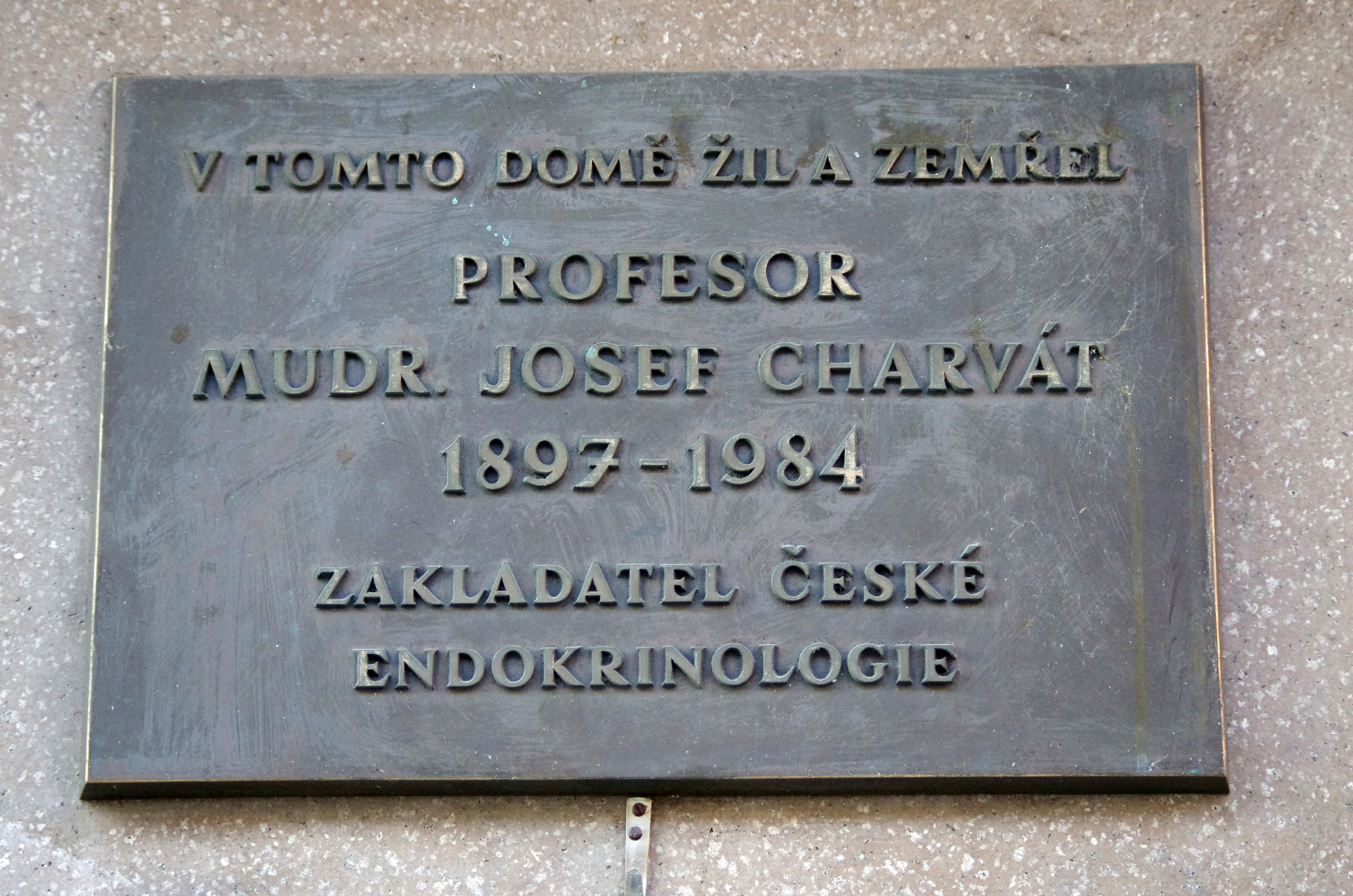
A plaque on the house where Josef Charvát lived and died

As a medical doctor, he participated in the Prague uprising in May 1945. He was a member of the Masonic lodge Nation No. 1 in Orient Prague and the Serbian Academy of Sciences and Arts.

In 1945, he founded the internal clinic at Charles University in Prague and was its head until 1970. In the 1950s, he later tried to refute ideological misinterpretations from the field of biology. He avoided positions tied to political affiliation. In 1969, he was briefly rector of Charles University. However, the rector's inauguration did not take place after the August 1968 occupation. A year later, he gave up the management of the clinic, but worked there as a researcher.

He is the founder of Czech endocrinology, his main field. He also dealt with stress, immunology and further education of doctors. He was a promoter of medical cybernetics and genetics. He was the first in the world to use insulin as a catalyst for nutrition in states of weakness and exhaustion. He is the author of the so-called Charvát diet for rapid weight loss, now abandoned.

He supported the tradition of an ethical, scientific and synthetic view of the patient and the entire field of internal medicine. He wrote medical-humorous popular articles and also philosophical works. He was based on the humanist tradition; he used synthetic thinking. He is the author of reflections that integrate medicine into a wider context. His main professional work is the book Diseases of Glands with Internal Secretion (1935).

He treated several important personalities from among politicians, artists and other prominent people (e.g. Antonín Švehla, Edvard Beneš, and Marta Gottwaldová). In 1953, he was the first doctor summoned to the dying President Klement Gottwald, who diagnosed him with pneumonia. He received numerous awards for his work: he was a recipient of the Order of the Republic, the Order of Labor, the Order of the Yugoslav Star, and the Klement Gottwald State Prize. He was awarded the title of Order of the Hero of Socialist Labour, and was an honorary doctor of Charles University and other world universities. He was a member of the Advisory Board for Science and Technology in the United Nations.

He died on 31 January 1984 in Prague.

== Selected publications ==
- Today's World and Freemasonry, 1949
- Life, Adaptation and Stress, 1969
- Man and His World, 1974
- My Labyrinth of the World, 2005
