= Francesco Pocchiari =

Italian chemist and pharmacologist

- Born: 25 June 1924; Melfi, Italy
- Died: 2 January 1989 (aged 64); Rome, Italy
- Occupations: Chemist and pharmacologist

Academic background
- Education: Sapienza University of Rome

Francesco Pocchiari (25 June 1924, Melfi - 2 January 1989, Rome) was an Italian chemist and pharmacologist, researcher in microbiology and biological chemistry. He was the director of the Istituto Superiore di Sanità between 1972 and 1989. In honor of his memory, the Francesco Pocchiari Fellowship was established in 1991 with funds provided by the Italian Government.

== Biography ==
Pocchiari was born on 25 June 1924 in Melfi, in the province of Potenza. He graduated chemistry in 1948 from the Sapienza University of Rome. He started as a researcher in 1949 at the Laboratory of Chemical Microbiology of the Istituto Superiore di Sanità together with Ernst Boris Chain. In 1969, he was appointed director of the biological chemistry laboratory of the Istituto Superiore di Sanità and, in 1971, he became a director of the institute, a position he would hold until his death. During his more than sixteen tenure, Pocchiari faced delicate and serious issues including the 1973 cholera epidemic in Naples. There also he collaborated with Rita Levi Montalcini who, together with Pocchiari, carried out fundamental research to guarantee her the Nobel Prize in Physiology or Medicine in 1986.

In 1954, he also graduated in pharmacy; two years later, he became a professor of applied biochemistry at the Sapienza University of Rome and also taught at the universities of Bologna and Bari. He also writes articles for medical journals such as Brain Research, Biochemical Journal, Lancet, Nature and is a member of Italian and international scientific committees such as the World Health Organization (WHO) Executive Committee in Geneva, and the European Council for Medical Research in Strasbourg. Pocchiari's achievements in the field of public health research are documented in the book "Accidental exposure to dioxins: human health aspects," which he co-edited with Frederick Coulston.

After his death, the Aula Magna of the Istituto Superiore di Sanità was dedicated to him. In honor of his memory, the Francesco Pocchiari Fellowship was established in 1991 with funds provided by the Italian Government. This fellowship is administered by the WHO and is awarded to individuals who have made significant contributions to public health research. The fellowship was initially endowed with US$104,960 from the Italian Government.

Pocchiari was married with three children. He died on 2 January 1989 in Rome.
