= Samuel Taylor Darling =

American scientist (1872–1925)

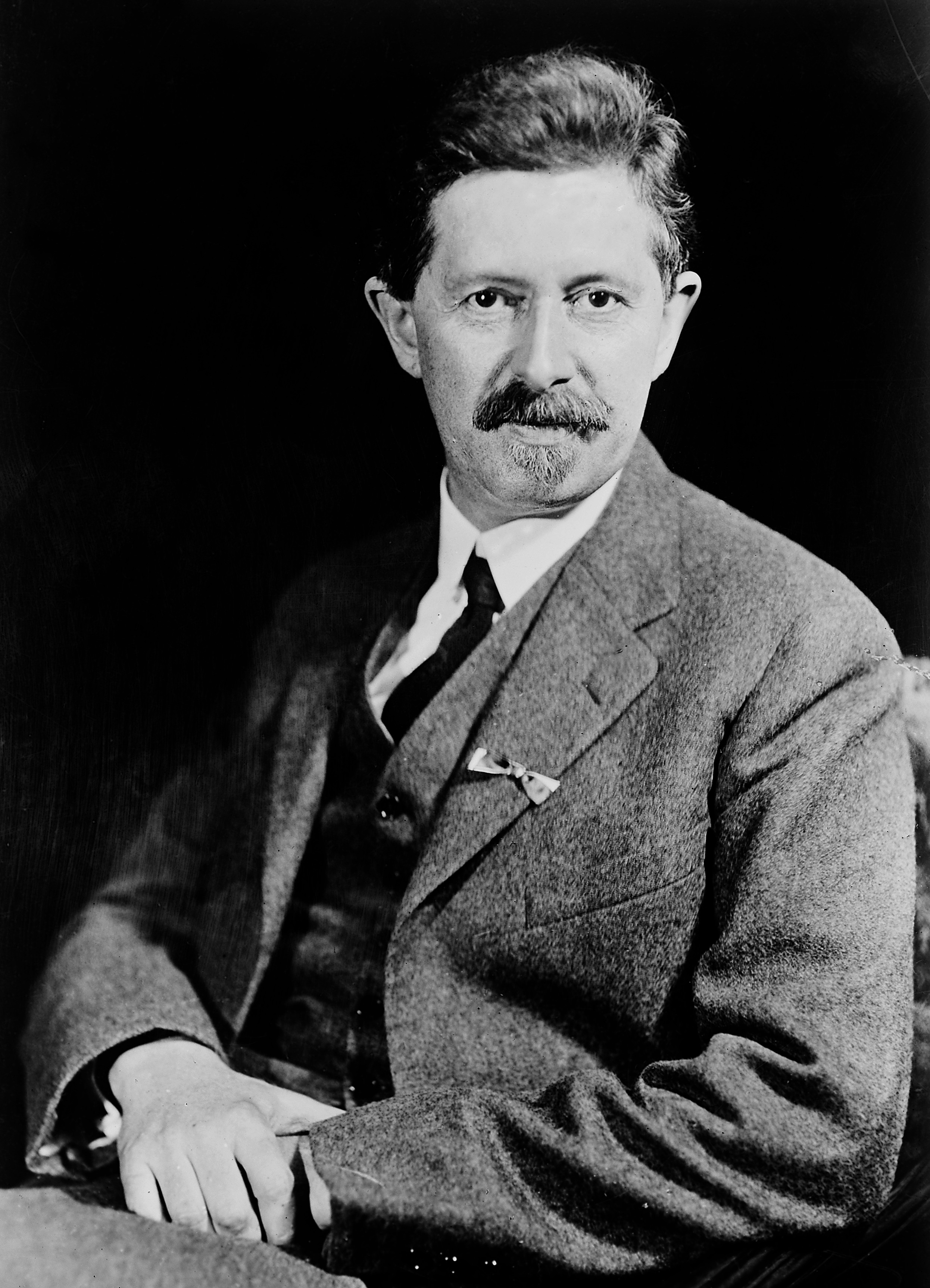
Samuel Taylor Darling

Samuel Taylor Darling (April 6, 1872 in Harrison, New Jersey – May 21, 1925 in Beirut) was an American pathologist and bacteriologist who discovered the pathogen Histoplasma capsulatum in Panama in 1906.

He died in Beirut in a car accident together with British malariologist Norman Lothian while on a survey trip for the League of Nations malaria commission. The Darling Foundation prize for malaria research was established in his memory.
