= Howard Waitzkin =

American sociologist

Howard Waitzkin is Distinguished Professor Emeritus in the Department of Sociology and Health Sciences Center at the University of New Mexico and adjunct professor at the University of Illinois College of Medicine.

== Education and career ==
Waitzkin grew up in a small town in northeastern Ohio. At an early age, tragedy in his low-income family spurred his interest in the relationships among oppression and inequality, public health, and medicine. Waitzkin received his MD and PhD in sociology from Harvard University in 1972. Over the course of his career, Waitzkin has practiced as a primary care physician in internal medicine and has taught social medicine at a variety of clinics and universities, including the United Farm Workers Clinic in Salinas, California; La Clínica de la Raza in Oakland, California; Stanford University Medical Center; Massachusetts General Hospital, Boston; and the University of California. Waitzkin joined the faculty of the University of New Mexico in 1997. Currently, he practices medicine part-time in rural areas and is adjunct professor of internal medicine at the University of Illinois.

As an activist, he has worked for single payer national health programs in the United States and Latin America; local community and worker control for accessible health services; civilian health and mental health services for active duty military personnel in the struggle for peace; and policies to improve the social, political, and economic determinants of illness and early death. He currently serves as director of the Civilian Medical Resources Network, which provides civilian health and mental health services for GIs who have not been able to meet their needs in the military, and president of the Allende Program in Social Medicine, a small foundation that supports work in social medicine worldwide.

== Research ==
Waitzkin has authored eight books, including Social Medicine and the Coming Transformation (Routledge, 2021) and Medicine and Public Health at the End of Empire (Paradigm Publishers, 2011), and more than two hundred articles and chapters. His research has examined the patient-physician relationship, Latin American social medicine, neoliberal healthcare models in Latin America and the United States, and health and imperialism. Waitzkin's work is inspired partly by Marxist theory and practice.

== Selected Awards & Honors ==
- Leo G. Reeder Award for Distinguished Scholarship in Medical Sociology (1997)
- Fulbright New Century Scholar (2001-2002)
- Fellow of the John Simon Guggenheim Memorial Foundation (2002-2003)
- Jonathan Mann Award for Lifetime Commitment to Public Health and Social Justice Issues from the New Mexico Public Health Association (2003)
- Presidential Teaching Fellow Award (Highest Teaching Award), University of New Mexico (2010-2012)
- Eliot Freidson Award for Outstanding Publication from the Medical Sociology Section of the American Sociological Association (2012)
- Lifetime Achievement Award from the Marxist Sociology Section of the American Sociological Association (2016)
- Fulbright Senior Fellowship, Seoul National University School of Public Health, South Korea (2019)

== Works ==
- The Exploitation of Illness in Capitalist Society. Bobbs-Merrill. 1974. (with Barbara Waterman)
- The Politics of Medical Encounters: How Patients and Doctors Deal with Social Problems. Yale University Press. 1991.
- The Second Sickness: Contradictions of Capitalist Health Care, 2nd Edition. Rowman & Littlefield. 2000.
- At the Front Lines of Medicine. Rowman & Littlefield. 2001.
- Medicine and Public Health at the End of Empire. Paradigm Publishers. 2011.
- Health Care Under the Knife: Moving Beyond Capitalism for Our Health. Monthly Review Press. 2018. (with the Working Group on Health Beyond Capitalism)
- Rinky-Dink Revolution: Moving Beyond Capitalism by Withholding Consent, Creative Constructions, and Creative Destructions. Daraja Press. 2020.
- Social Medicine and the Coming Transformation. Routledge. 2021. (with Alina Pérez and Matthew Anderson)
