= National Institute of Health (Italy) =

Italian public health institution

- Istituto Superiore di Sanità

Agency overview
- Formed: April 21, 1934
- Headquarters: Rome, Italy
- Employees: 1,808
- Agency executives: Silvio Brusaferro, Straordinary commissioner of ISS; Angelo Del Favero, Director General of ISS
- Parent agency: Ministero della Salute
- Website: www.iss.it

The National Institute of Health (Italian: Istituto Superiore di Sanità, lit. 'Higher Health Institute') , also ISS, is an Italian public institution that, as the leading technical-scientific body of the Italian National Health Service (Servizio Sanitario Nazionale), performs research, trials, control, counseling, documentation and training for public health. The Institute is under the supervision of the Ministry of Health (Ministero della Salute).

== History ==
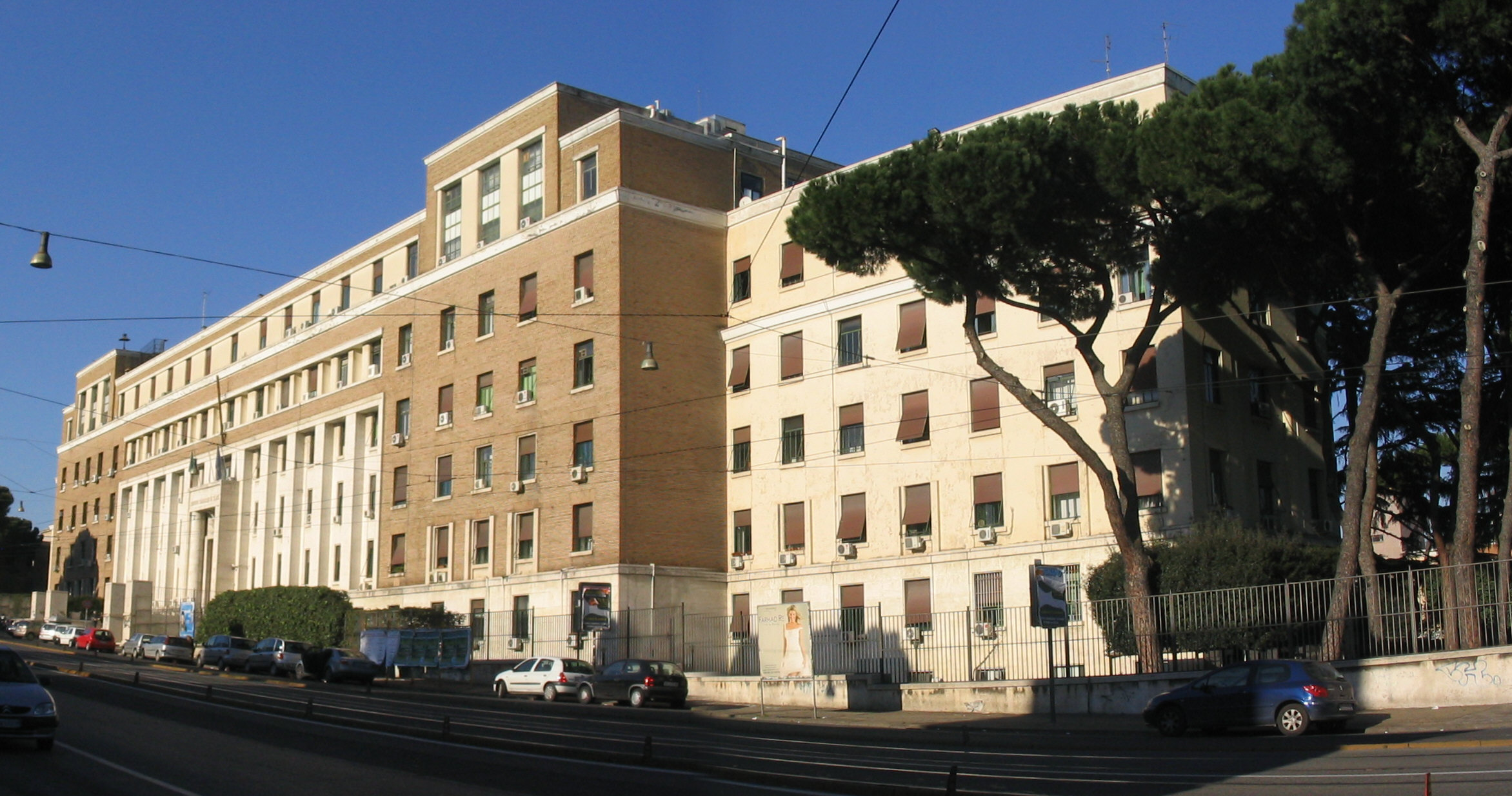
Headquarters of ISS in Rome

The official opening of the ISS, called Institute of Public Health (Istituto di Sanità Pubblica), took place on April 21, 1934. The construction of the main building in Rome, designed by architect Giuseppe Amendola, started on July 6, 1931 and it was financed by the American Rockefeller Foundation.

In 1941 the Institute of Public Health (Istituto di Sanità Pubblica) assumed its present name of the National Institute of Health (Istituto Superiore di Sanità).

In 1958 the ISS came under the protection of the Ministry of Health, from the Ministry of Interior.

=== ISS Directors (then Presidents) ===
- Gaetano Basile (1934–35)
- Dante De Blasi (1935)
- Domenico Marotta (1935–61)
- Giordano Giacomello (1961–64)
- Giovan Battista Marini Bettolo Marconi (1964–72)
- Francesco Pocchiari (1972–89)
- Vincenzo Longo (1989)
- Francesco Antonio Manzoli (1989–93)
- Giuseppe Vicari (1993–95)
- Aurelia Sargentini (1995–96)
- Giuseppe Benagiano (1996–2001)
- Enrico Garaci (2001–13)
- Fabrizio Oleari (2013–14)
- Gualtiero Ricciardi (2015–18); Commissioner (2014–15)
- Silvio Brusaferro (2019–2023); Commissioner (first seven months of 2019)
- Rocco Bellantone (2024-present); Commissioner (2023-2024)

=== Nobel Prize Winners ===
- Daniel Bovet
- Ernst Boris Chain
- Enrico Fermi
- Rita Levi Montalcini

== Structure ==
=== Departments ===
- Environment and Primary Prevention
- Cell Biology and Neurosciences
- Haematology, Oncology and Molecular Medicine
- Therapeutic Research and Medicines Evaluation
- Infectious, Parasitic and Immune-Mediated Diseases
- Veterinary Public Health and Food Safety
- Technology and Health

=== National centres ===
- National AIDS Centre
- National Centre for Chemical Substances
- National Centre for Epidemiology, Surveillance and Health Promotion
- Centre for Immunobiologicals Research and Evaluation
- National Centre for Rare Diseases
- Evaluation and Accreditation Body
- National Blood Centre
- National Transplant Centre

=== Technical services ===
- Service for Biotechnology and Animal Welfare
- Data Management, Documentation, Library and Publishing Activities

== Bibliography ==
- Bignami, Giorgio. "Origins and Subsequent Development of the Istituto Superiore di Sanità in Rome (Italy)" (PDF). iss.it (in Italian). Italy: National Institute of Health. Archived from the original (PDF) on 2011-01-14.
