= Eugène Aujaleu =

French physician (1903–1990)

National Institute of Health and Medical Research
- In office 1964–1969

General Directorate of Health
- In office 1956–1964

Personal details
- Born: 29 October 1903 Nègrepelisse, Tarn-et-Garonne, France
- Died: 26 August 1990 (aged 86) Gambais, Yvelines, France
- Awards: Léon Bernard Foundation Prize (1971); Grand Cross of the Ordre national du Mérite; Grand Officer of the Legion of Honor; Commander of the Order of the Crown
- Scientific career
- Workplaces: Institut Pasteur; Institute for Advanced National Defense Studies; Center for Advanced Administrative Studies; University of Toulouse; World Health Organization; Toulouse University

Eugène Aujaleu (29 October 1903 - 26 August 1990) is a French doctor and public health official. He was the first Director General of Health from 1956 to 1964, then the first Director General of the National Institute of Health and Medical Research (INSERM) from 1964 to 1969.

== Early life, education and pre-war years ==
Eugène Aujaleu was born on 29 October 1903 in Nègrepelisse. Aujaleu studied medicine at the Faculty of Medicine of Toulouse (thesis in 1928). He turned to the field of infectiology. He became an associate professor at the Hôpital du Val-de-Grâce in 1936, where he directed the chair of epidemiology as well as the phthisiology department of the Percy military hospital.

== Second World War and early public service career ==
During the Second World War, he took over the management of the hygiene and epidemiology services of the French Armed Forces and then, in 1941, was appointed Inspector General of Public Health. Present by chance in Algiers when the allied troops arrived in 1942, he joined them and became the civilian health officer for the liberated territories. He took on new responsibilities in the field of public health with the French Committee of National Liberation. Upon release, he was appointed director of social hygiene at the Ministry of Public Health and Population.

== Post-war years ==
In 1956, he was the first Director General of Health, a position in which he would be one of the great architects, with Robert Debré, of the reform of medical studies, the health system, and the creation of CHUs (university hospital centres). He plays a major role in reforming public psychiatry through the circular of 15 March 1960.

When INSERM was created, an offshoot of the National Institute of Hygiene headed by Louis Bugnard, he took over its first management in 1964 and laid all the foundations for the administrative operation and the objectives of the new institute which turned no longer just towards prevention and statistical studies, but now essentially towards research in biology and medicine. He left his post in 1969 and was replaced by Constant Burg.

Aujaleu ended his career as State Councillor and representative of France at the World Health Organization until 1982.

== Personal life and death ==
In 1937, Aujaleu married Nadine Blanche Dumas, together they had two daughter.

Aujaleu died on 26 August 1990.

== Prizes and honours ==
- Léon Bernard Foundation Prize (WHO) in 1971
- Grand Officer of the Legion of Honor
- Grand Cross of the National Order of Merit
- Commander of the Order of the Crown
