= École de médecine de l'AOF =

École de médecine de l'Afrique Occidentale Française, also known as École de médecine de l'AOF, was a medical school in Dakar, Senegal. Its successor is the Faculty of Medicine of Cheikh Anta Diop University.

== History ==
=== French West Africa School of Medicine ===
The French West Africa School of Medicine (École de médecine de l'Afrique Occidentale Française) was established on 1 November 1918, pursuant to a government decree of 14 January 1918, to train medical workers and midwives to assist colonial physicians and pharmacists. It was inaugurated and headed by Aristide Le Dantec, director of a hospital founded in 1913 to treat the indigenous population of French West Africa. Almost all teachers belonged to the Corps de santé colonial. Students were selected through competition at École normale supérieure William Ponty, where they studied a year of basic sciences before joining the medical school. There was a four-year program in medicine and three-year programs in pharmacy, midwifery and veterinary studies. The veterinary students completed their programs in Bamako in Mali.

In 1906 Ernest Roume, the governor general of French West Africa, established the Aides médecins indigènes, a corps of indigenous medical aides who had completed a French Certificate of Primary Education and 30 months of medical studies. In 1916 Jules Carde had founded an African school of medicine and pharmacy, which became the French West Africa School of Medicine in 1918.

From 1944 the school also trained students from French Equatorial Africa in Congo (École Edouard Renard de Brazzaville), Cameroon (École de santé d'Ayos) and Togo. By the end of 1953, the school had graduated 582 doctors, 87 pharmacists and 447 midwives. Félix Houphouët-Boigny, former president of Côte d'Ivoire, was a graduate of the school.

=== School of Medicine and Pharmacy Dakar ===
Beginning in 1950 the school became an integral part of the French national education system and was from 1953 known as École préparatoire de médecine et pharmacie de Dakar. Students would study for three years of medical education in Dakar and complete their medical degrees in France, primarily in Bordeaux.

=== National School of Medicine and Pharmacy ===
In 1958, it became l'École nationale de médecine et pharmacie and from 1960 began issuing its own university degrees equivalent to those issued by France.

=== Faculty of Medicine of Cheikh Anta Diop University ===
In 1962, the medical school became the Faculty of Medicine of Cheikh Anta Diop University in Dakar.

== See also ==
- Public health in Senegal, and Jules Carde, French Wikipedia articles

== Bibliography ==
- "Medical School for French West Africa". Journal of the American Medical Association. 71 (14). Chicago, USA: 1155. 5 October 1918. doi:10.1001/jama.1918.02600400052018.
- "L'École de médecine indigène de l'Afrique occidentale française", Bulletin d'Informations et de Renseignements (AOF), No.199, 15 Aug. 1938, pp. 303–306
- "La première école de médecine d'Afrique noire est inaugurée à Dakar", Bulletin d'information de l'AOF, No. 76, 16 Nov. 1950, pp. 8–9
