= WHO public health prizes and awards =

World Health Organization (WHO) public health prizes and awards are given to recognise major achievements in public health. The candidates are nominated and recommended by each prize and award selection panel. The WHO Executive Board selects the winners, which are presented during the World Health Assembly. Some of these awards are originally stated by WHO and other were inherited from the League of Nations.

== Léon Bernard Foundation Prize ==
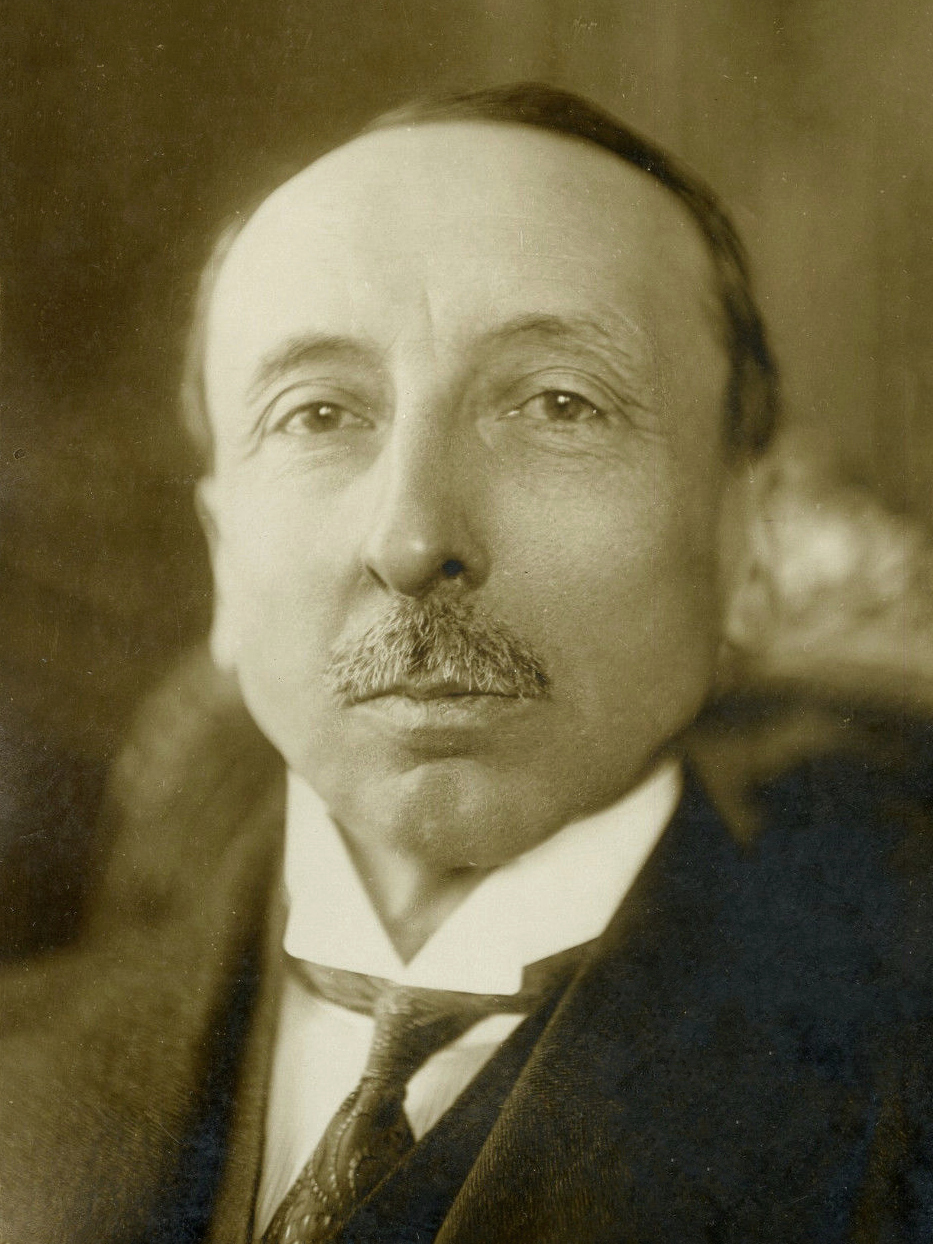
Léon Bérard in 1931

Established in 1937 in memory of professor Léon Bérard (1876–1960), one of the founders of the League of Nations, to celebrate outstanding service in the field of social medicine. The prize is awarded when there is enough funding, consisting of a bronze medal and a sum of 2500 CHF to be awarded to a person who has accomplished it.

== Ihsan Doğramacı Family Health Foundation Prize ==
Established in 1980 by professor İhsan Doğramacı (1915–2010) to celebrate paediatricians and child health specialists who have given distinguished service in this field every two years. The prize consists of a gold-plated silver medal, a certificate, and an honorarium for services in the field of family health.

== Sasakawa Health Prize ==
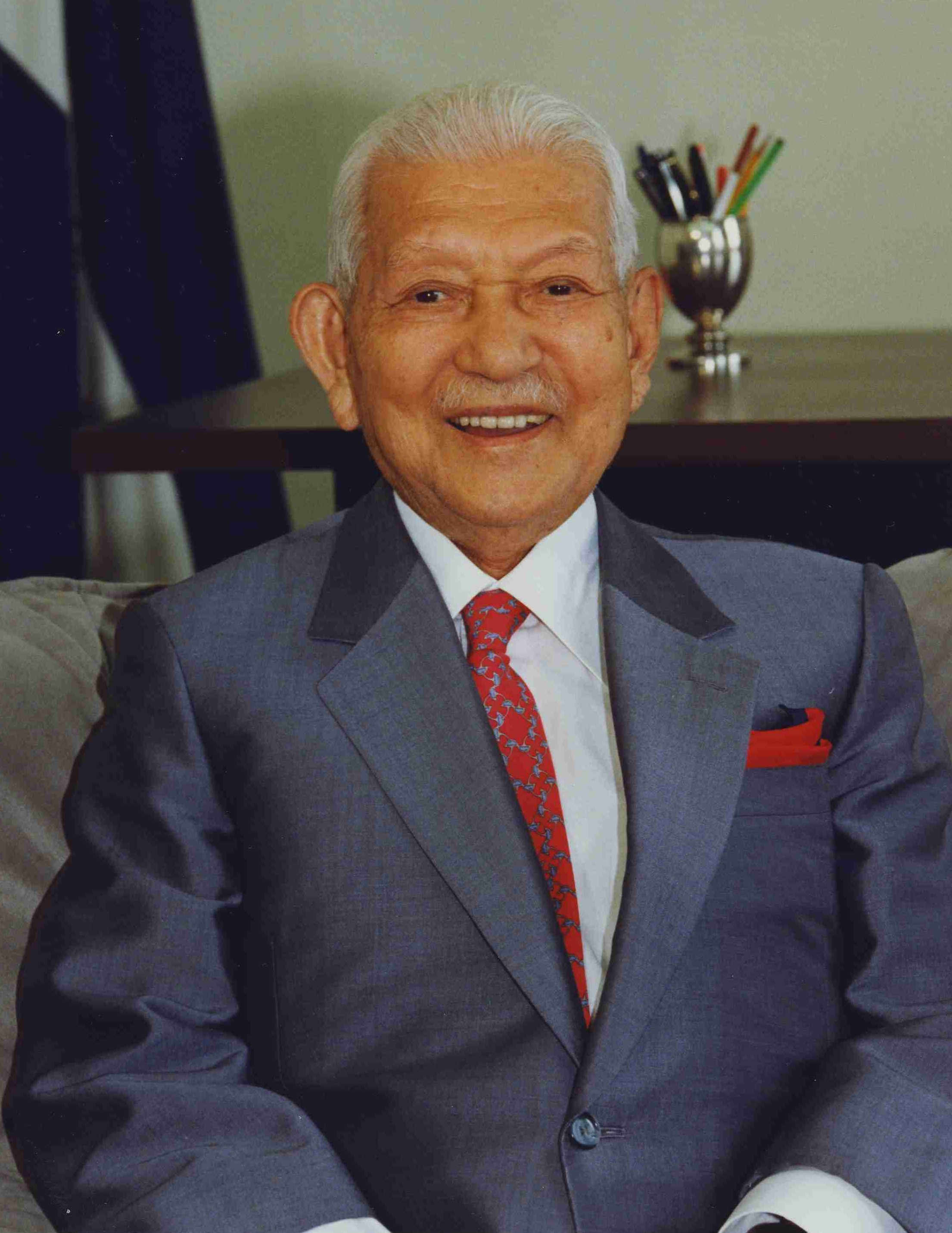
Ryōichi Sasakawa c. 1990s

On the idea and with financial support from Mr Ryōichi Sasakawa (1899–1995), Chairman of the Japan Shipbuilding Industry Foundation and President of the Sasakawa Memorial Health Foundation, the award was founded in 1984. The Sasakawa Health Prize consists of a statuette and money of the order of US$30,000 to be given to a person(s) and/or of the order of US$40,000 to be given to an institution(s), who have accomplished outstanding innovative work in health development, such as the promotion of specific health programmes or significant advancements in primary health care, to encourage the further development of health.

== United Arab Emirates Health Foundation Prize ==
The prize was established in 1993 under the directive of HM Sheikh Zayed Bin Sultan Al Nahayyan (1918–2004). The prize consists of a certified award, a plaque, and up to US$40,000. The prize can be awarded to more than one person or institution that has made an outstanding contribution to health development.

== Sheikh Sabah Al-Ahmad Al-Jaber Al-Sabah Prize ==
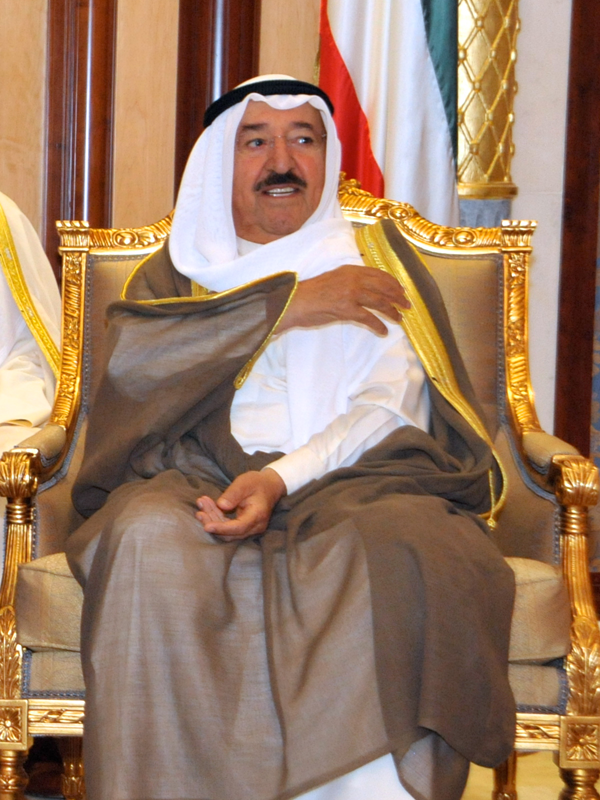
Sabah Al-Ahmad Al-Jaber Al-Sabah in 2013

His Highness Sheikh Sabah Al-Ahmad Al-Jaber Al-Sabah (1929–2020) Prize is awarded for research in health care for the elderly and health promotion by the State of Kuwait Health Promotion Foundation to the individual(s) or institution(s). The prize consists of a certificate of achievement, a plaque from the organization's founder, and an amount of money that cannot exceed US$40,000.

== Lee Jong-wook Memorial Prize for Public Health ==
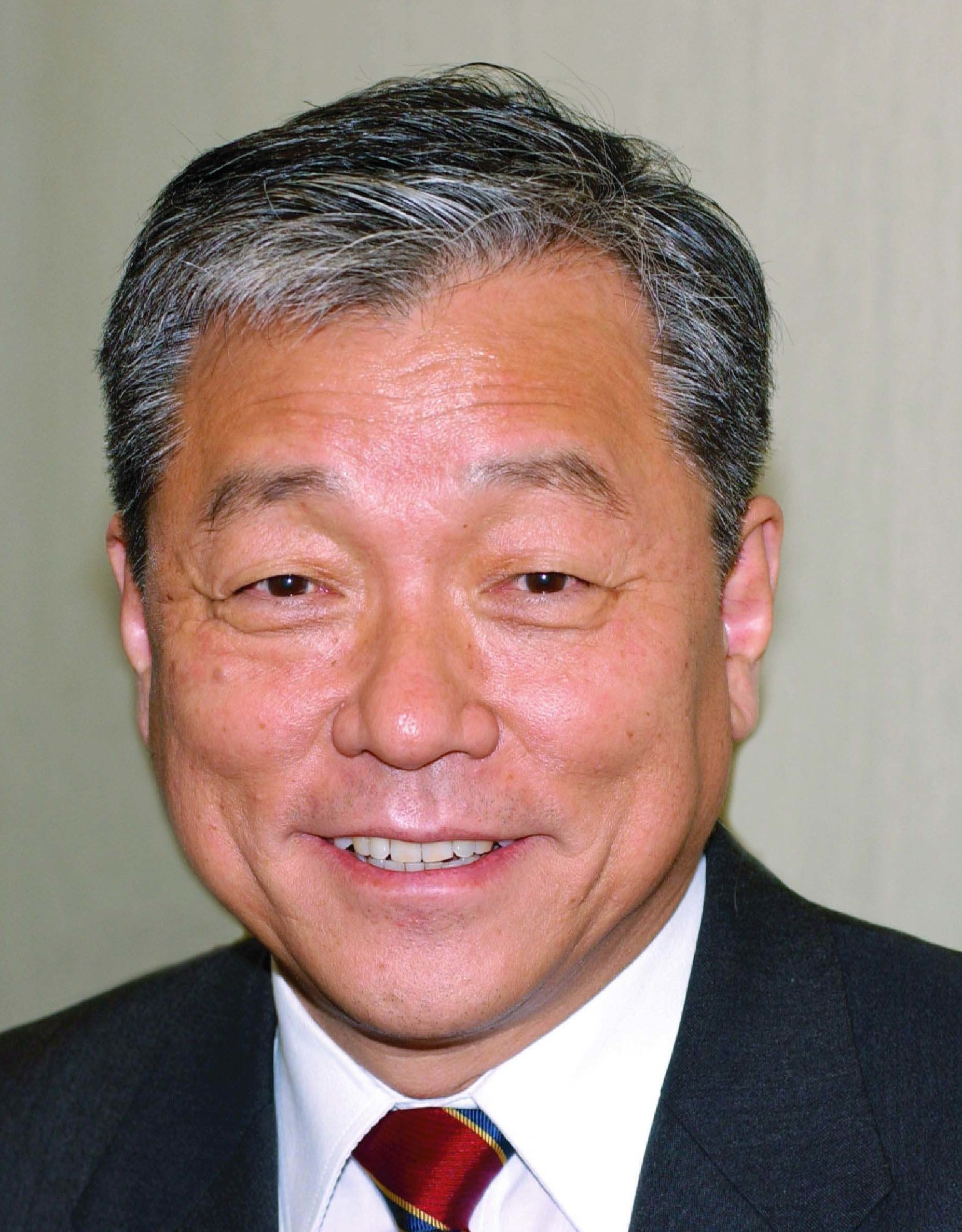
Lee Jong-wook in 2005

Established in 2008 in memory of Lee Jong-wook (1945–2006) to celebrate outstanding contributions to public health that went beyond the call of normal duties. The prize consists of a plaque and a sum of money which will not exceed US$100,000.

== Nelson Mandela Award for Health Promotion ==
The award, which embraces Nelson Mandela's (1918–2013) humility, was established in 2019 to celebrate a person(s) or institution(s) that made a significant contribution to health promotion extended far beyond the call of normal duties. The award consists of a plaque.

=== Past recipients ===
Year	Name	Country
2020	The Equi-Sastipen-Rroma Network	Spain
2020	Sally Davies	UK
2021	The Thai Health Promotion Foundation (ThaiHealth)	Thailand
2022	Wu Zunyou	China
2023	Mariam Athbi Al Jalahma	Bahrain
2024	Bontle Mbongwe	Botswana
2024	National Institute of Mental Health and Neurosciences	India

== A. T. Shousha Foundation Prize and Fellowship ==
In 1966, the 9th World Health Assembly established a foundation bearing Aly Tewfik Shousha (1891–1964) to honour the memory as one of the World Health Organization founders and first WHO regional director for the Eastern Mediterranean. The foundation's purpose is to award a prize known as the Shousha Prize, which is to be given to a person who made the most significant contribution to any health problem in the geographical area in which Shousha served the WHO. The foundation also gives a fellowship every six years that amounts to US$15,000.

== The Down Syndrome Research Prize in the Eastern Mediterranean Region ==
The prize was founded in 1998 to promote the study of Down syndrome. Abdul Rahman Abdulla Al-Awadi, head of the Islamic Organization for Medical Sciences, came up with the idea and donated the funding after taking into account the high frequency of Down syndrome in the Eastern Mediterranean region. The award, which consists of a bronze medal and the current equivalent of US$2,000, is given to one or more individuals who have distinguished themselves in Down syndrome research. The prize has been given out every two years since 2000.

=== Past recipients ===
Year	Name	Country
2000	Sadika Al Awadi	Kuwait
2004	Ekram Abdel Salam	Egypt
2006	Anna Rajab	Oman
2008	Gholam Ali Frooz	Iran
2010	Hoda Abdullah Kattan	Saudi Arabia
2010	Al Nahda Schools for Down Syndrome	Saudi Arabia
2010	Sabah Zemmama Tyal	Morocco
2012	Muneera Abdullah Al-Husain	Saudi Arabia
2019	Saeed Dastgiri	Iran

== The State of Kuwait Prize for the Control of Cancer, Cardiovascular Diseases and Diabetes in the Eastern Mediterranean Region ==
The foundation was formed in 2003 by the State of Kuwait and awarded an individual who has made an exceptional contribution to the prevention, control, or study of diabetes, cardiovascular disease, or cancer. The prize, which consists of a bronze medal and an amount of money estimated to be worth US$5,000, can be awarded to one or more people once a year.

== Francesco Pocchiari Fellowship ==
Established in 1991 in memory of Francesco Pocchiari (1924–1989), former Director-General of the Istituto Superiore di Sanità, with funds from the Italian Government. The prize awards US$10,000 travelling fellowships to keen researchers from developing countries to enable them to gain experience researching health issues that relate to developing countries.

=== Past recipients ===
Year	Name	Country
1993	Gyula Poor	Hungary
1993	William Saila Pomat	Papua New Guinea
1997	Mesfin Kassaye	Ethiopia
1999	Raimonda Totoni	Albania
2001	Tay Sun Tee	Malaysia
2003	Fatwa Sari Tetra Dewi	Indonesia
2005	Gönul Dinç	Turkey
2008	Uranchimeg Davaatseren	Mongolia
2008	Intesar Alsaidi	Yemen

== Discontinued prizes ==
=== The Darling Foundation Prize ===
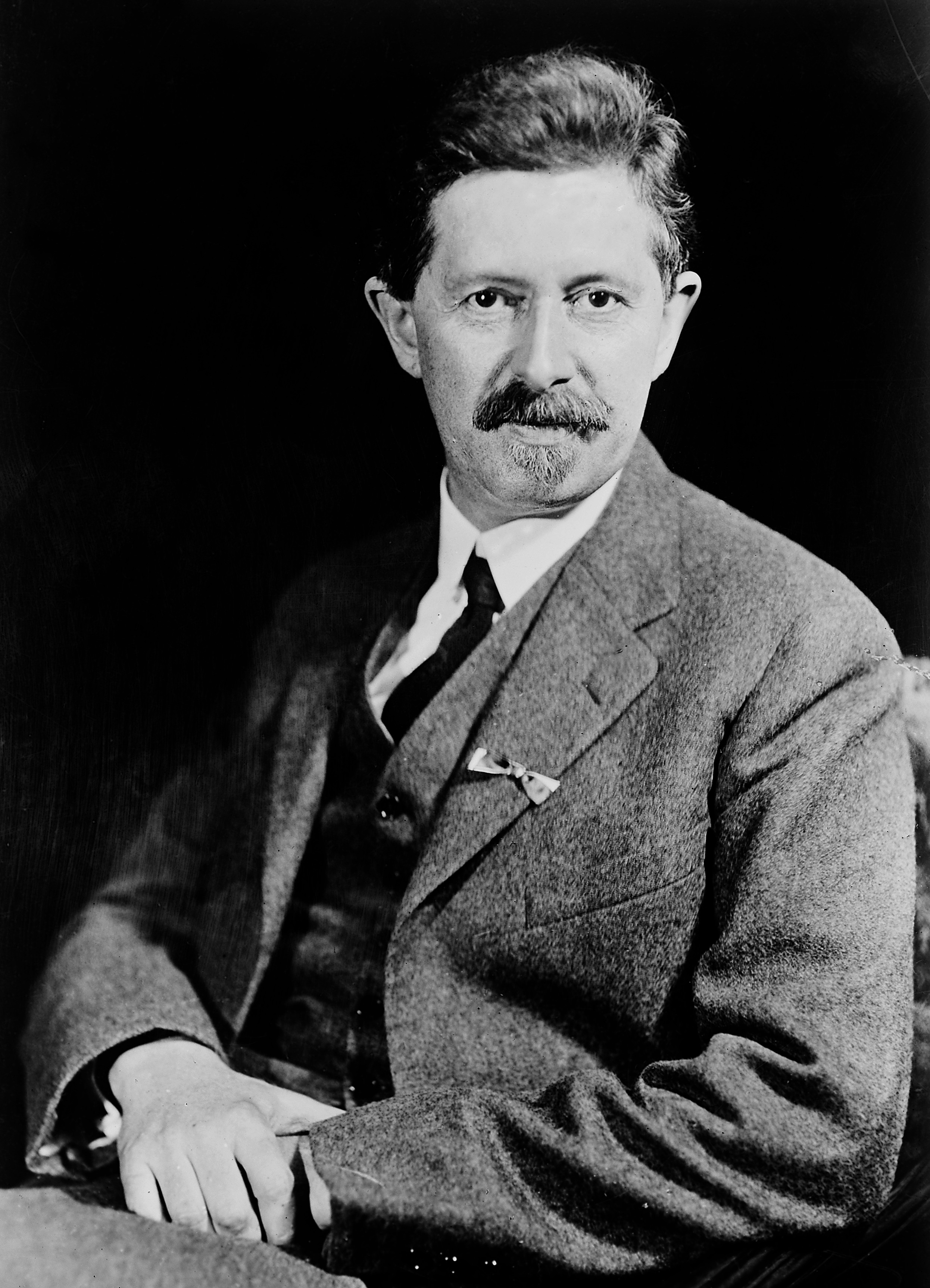
Samuel Taylor Darling

The Darling Foundation was established in 1929 in honour of eminent malaria expert Samuel Taylor Darling (1872–1925), who died tragically while participating in a study expedition for the League of Nations' Malaria Commission. In 1948, WHO acquired control of the foundation. A bronze medal and a fixed amount of 2500 CHF make up the Darling Foundation Prize, which is given for exceptional work in the pathology, aetiology, epidemiology, treatment, prevention, or control of malaria. It was discontinued in 2000.

=== Jacques Parisot Foundation Fellowship ===
The foundation was founded in 1969 by Mrs Parisot in honour of professor Jacques Parisot (1882–1967), who was a founding member of WHO and signed the Organization's Constitution on behalf of France at the 1946 International Health Conference in New York. The foundation's goal is to promote social medicine or public health research by providing fellowships, which are given out every two years (even years). A bronze medal and a value of US$5,000 make up the prize. It was discontinued in 2015.

=== Comlan A.A. Quenum Prize for Public Health ===
The award was founded in 1987 to pay tribute to Comlan A. A. Quenum (1926–1984), a Beninese physician and the first African to serve as the regional director of the WHO, and is given to the individual deemed to have made the greatest contribution to enhancing health in the region of Africa. The prize is funded by the Government of Cameroon and consists of a bronze medal and a reward of US$2,000. The prize was awarded every two years until it was discontinued in 2000.

==== Past recipients ====
Year	Name	Country
1989	I. Diop Mar	Senegal
1991	Noerine Kaleeba	Uganda
1991	Blair Research Institute	Zimbabwe
1993	Expanded Project on Immunization Project	Benin
1995	Ione Bertocchi	Central African Republic
1997	Redda Tekle-Haimanot	Ethiopia
2000	Mankuba Jacobeth Ramalepe	South Africa
