= Social medicine =

Understanding how culture and larger groups of people shape health procedures

Social medicine is an interdisciplinary field that focuses on the interplay between socio-economic factors and individual health outcomes. Rooted in the challenges of the Industrial Revolution, it seeks to:

1. Understand how specific social, economic, and environmental conditions directly impact health, disease, and the delivery of medical care.
2. Promote conditions and interventions that address these determinants, aiming for a healthier and more equitable society.

Social medicine as a scientific field gradually began in the early 19th century in Europe, during the Industrial Revolution and the subsequent increase in poverty and disease among workers raised concerns about the effect of social processes on the health of the poor. The field of social medicine is most commonly addressed today by efforts to understand what are known as social determinants of health.

== Scope ==
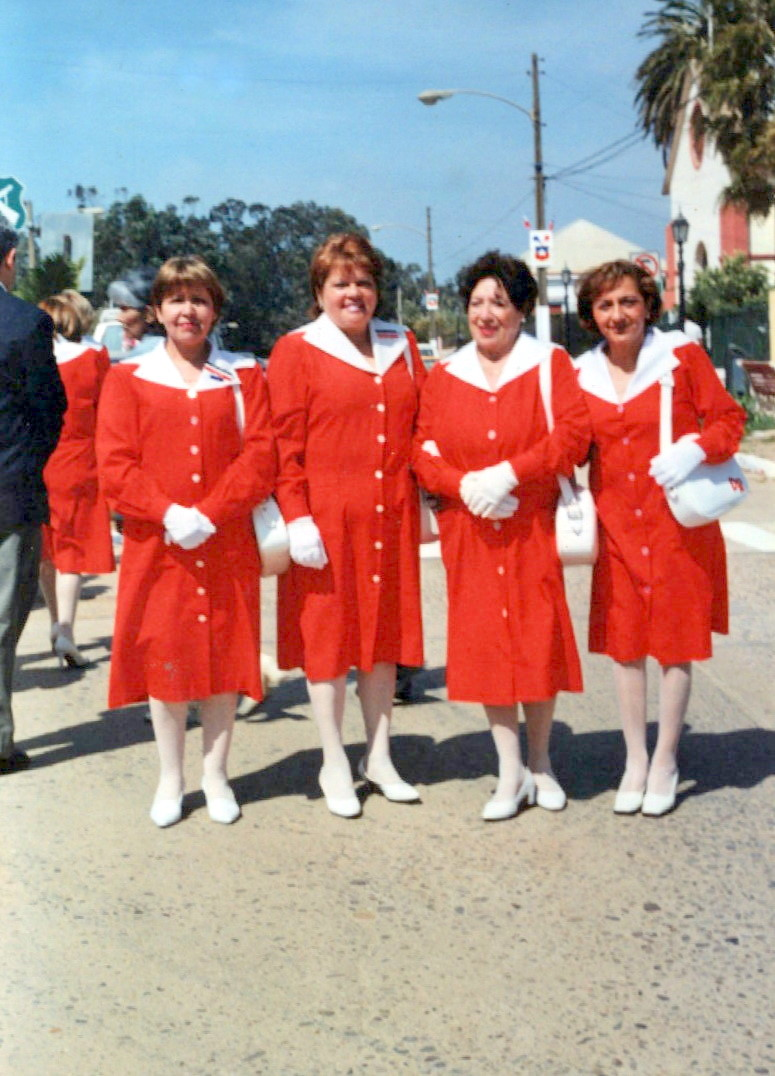
A group of Chilean 'Damas de Rojo', volunteers on their local hospital and an example of social medicine

The major emphasis on biomedical science in medical education, health care, and medical research has resulted into a gap with our understanding and acknowledgement of far more important social determinants of health and individual disease: social-economic inequalities, war, illiteracy, detrimental life-styles (smoking, obesity), discrimination because of race, gender and religion. Farmer et al. (2006) gave the following explanation for this gap:

The holy grail of modern medicine remains the search for a molecular basis of disease. While the practical yield of such circumscribed inquiry has been enormous, exclusive focus on molecular-level phenomena has contributed to the increasing "desocialization" of scientific inquiry: a tendency to ask only biological questions about what are in fact biosocial phenomena.

They further concluded that "Biosocial understandings of medical phenomena are urgently needed".

== Social care ==
Social care aims to promote wellness and emphasizes preventive, ameliorative, and maintenance efforts during illness, impairment, or disability. It adopts a holistic perspective on health and encompasses a variety of practices and viewpoints aimed at disease prevention and reduction of the economic, social, and psychological burdens associated with prolonged illnesses and diseases. The social model was developed as a direct response to the medical model, the social model sees barriers (physical, attitudinal and behavioural) not just as a biomedical issue, but as caused in part by the society we live in – as a product of the physical, organizational and social worlds that lead to discrimination (Oliver 1996; French 1993; Oliver and Barnes 1993). Social care advocates equality of opportunities for vulnerable sections of society.

== History ==
German physician Rudolf Virchow (1821–1902) laid the foundations for this model. Other prominent figures in the history of social medicine, beginning from the 20th century, include Salvador Allende, Alice Stewart, Henry E. Sigerist, Thomas McKeown, Victor W. Sidel, Howard Waitzkin, and more recently Paul Farmer and Jim Yong Kim.

In The Second Sickness, Waitzkin traces the history of social medicine from Engels, through Virchow and Allende. Waitzkin has sought to educate North Americans about the contributions of Latin American Social Medicine.

In 1976, the British public health scientist and health care critic Thomas McKeown, MD, published "The role of medicine: Dream, mirage or nemesis?", wherein he summarized facts and arguments that supported what became known as McKeown's thesis, i.e. that the growth of population can be attributed to a decline in mortality from infectious diseases, primarily thanks to better nutrition, later also to better hygiene, and only marginally and late to medical interventions such as antibiotics and vaccines. McKeown was heavily criticized for his controversial ideas, but is nowadays remembered as "the founder of social medicine".

== Occupational health and social medicine ==
The world of work played a fundamental role in the development of a social approach to health during the first industrial revolution, as exemplified by Virchow’s work on typhus and coal miners. Over the past 50 years, Occupational Safety and Health. The resulting distinction between work/nonwork related risks and outcomes has served as an artificial line of demarcation between OSH and the rest of public health. However, growing social inequality, the fundamental reorganization of the world of work, and a broadening of our understanding of the relationship between work and health have blurred this line of demarcation and highlight the need to expand and complement the reductionist view of cause and effect. In response, OSH is reintegrating a social approach to account for the social, political, and economic interactions that contribute to occupational health outcomes.

== See also ==
- Cost of poverty
- Epidemiology
- Medical anthropology
- Medical sociology
- Public health
- Social determinants of health in poverty
- Social epidemiology
- Social prescribing
- Social psychology
- Socialized medicine
- Society for Social Medicine
- Urban forest inequity
